= Du Pas de la Mancelière =

French naval officer of the War of American Independence

Du Pas de la Mancelière ( — Ajax, Battle of Cuddalore, 20 June 1783) was a French Navy officer. He notably captained the 64-gun Ajax in Suffren's squadron during the Anglo-French War, and was killed in action at the Battle of Cuddalore.

== Biography ==
Du Pas joined the Navy as a Garde-Marine on 19 January 1757. He was promoted to Lieutenant on 4 April 1777, and to Captain on 15 September 1782.

Du Pas arrived in the Indian Ocean with the first wave of reinforcements set there after Suffren took command of the squadron, as first Lieutenant on the 60-gun Saint Michel under Captain d'Aymar and First officer Vignes d'Arrac.

In the run-up to the Battle of Trincomalee, on 25 August 1782, Du Pas led four companies of marines to lay siege to the forts of Trincomalee.

On 9 February 1783, Suffren appointed him to the command of the 64-gun Ajax. He was killed at his station during the battle, as Ajax was bearing to HMS Inflexible.

== Sources and references ==
Notes

Bibliography

- Cunat, Charles (1852). Histoire du Bailli de Suffren. Rennes: A. Marteville et Lefas.
- Lacour-Gayet, Georges (1910). La marine militaire de la France sous le règne de Louis XVI. Paris: Honoré Champion.
- Roche, Jean-Michel (2005). Dictionnaire des bâtiments de la flotte de guerre française de Colbert à nos jours. Vol. 1. Group Retozel-Maury Millau. ISBN 978-2-9525917-0-6. OCLC 165892922. (1671-1870)
