= Péan de la Villehunault =

Naval officer

Péan de la Villehunault ( — Consolante, Battle of Trincomalee, 3 September 1782) was a French Navy officer. He fought in the War of American Independence, and taking part in the French operations in the Indian Ocean under Suffren.

== Biography ==
Péan de la Villehunault joined the Navy as a Garde-Marine on 8 May 1757. He was promoted to Lieutenant on 4 April 1777.

Péan de la Villehunault served as a Lieutenant on the 74-gun Orient. On 2 September 1780, he was promoted to the command of the 32-gun frigate Consolante. In November 1781, he departed France with a division under Bussy, bound for Isle de France (Mauritius). On 9 August 1782, Consolante made her junction with Suffren's squadron at Batacalo, along with Saint-Michel and Illustre.

Péan de la Villehunault was killed in action at the Battle of Trincomalee on 3 September 1782, when a grenade exploded near him.

== Sources and references ==
Notes

Bibliography

- Cunat, Charles (1852). Histoire du Bailli de Suffren. Rennes: A. Marteville et Lefas.
- Lacour-Gayet, G. (1910). La marine militaire de la France sous le règne de Louis XV. Paris: Honoré Champion.
