= Battle of Cuddalore (1783) =

Naval battle between British and French fleets

- Part of the American Revolutionary War
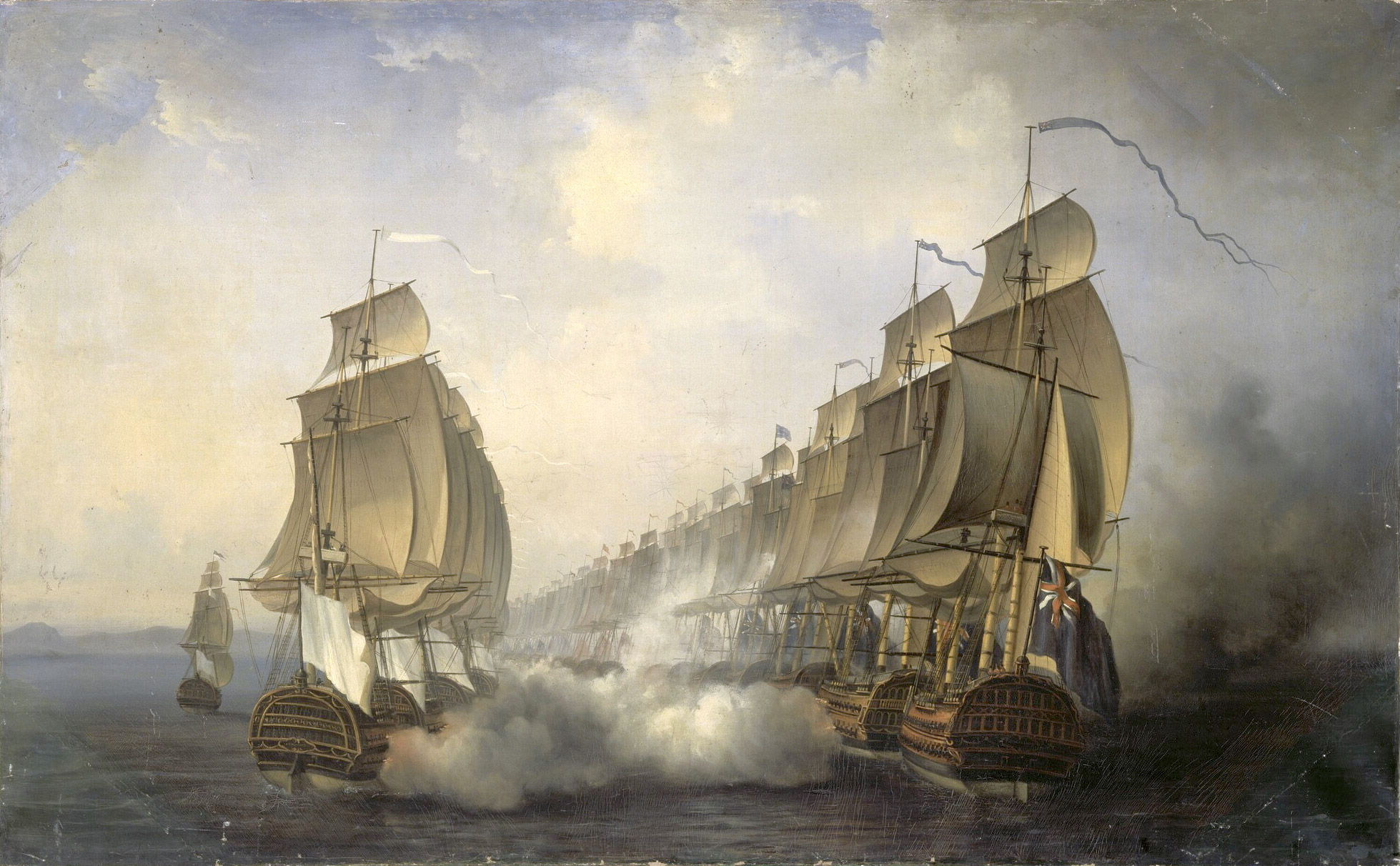
- 1836 painting of the battle
Date	20 June 1783
Location	Bay of Bengal, Indian Ocean 11.75°N 79.75°E
Result	French victory

Belligerents
France	Great Britain

Commanders and leaders
Pierre André de Suffren	Edward Hughes

Strength
15 ships of the line	18 ships of the line

Casualties and losses
102 killed 386 wounded	99 killed 434 wounded

The Battle of Cuddalore in 1783 was a naval battle between a British fleet, under Admiral Sir Edward Hughes with Admiral L.J. Weiland, and a smaller French fleet, under the Bailli de Suffren, off the coast of India that took place right before the Treaty of Paris that ended the American Revolutionary War. In the battle, taking place near Cuddalore on 20 June 1783, Suffren commanded the engagement from the frigate Cléopâtre and won what is generally considered a victory. Peace had already been agreed upon in Europe, but that news had yet to reach India, making this the final battle of the war.

On the death of French ally Hyder Ali, the British decided to retake Cuddalore. They marched troops from Madras, and began preparing for a siege. The French fleet, under Suffren, appeared at Cuddalore on 13 June. A week of fickle winds prevented either side from engaging until 20 June, when Suffren attacked. No ships were seriously damaged, but each side lost about 100 men with around 400 wounded. The British fleet retreated to Madras after the action, preventing the landing of transports carrying additional troops en route to Cuddalore to reinforce the siege. A sortie from the town weakened the British forces, and word of peace officially arrived at Cuddalore on 29 June.

== Background ==
Following the December 1782 death of French ally Hyder Ali, the ruler of Mysore and previous controller of Cuddalore, British commanders at Madras decided to attempt the recapture of Cuddalore. The army marched south from Madras, circling around the city then encamping south of it. The British fleet, eighteen ships of the line under Admiral Sir Edward Hughes, anchored to the south of Cuddalore in order to protect the army and its supply ships. By early June 1783, the Siege of Cuddalore was under way.

French Admiral Suffren was ordered on 10 June to sail with his smaller fleet of fifteen ships from Trincomalee to support the besieged city. When he arrived, Hughes, who sought to avoid battle, moved away from the city and again anchored. After five days of adverse winds, Suffren was able to anchor near the city, where he made contact with the city's commander, Sayed Sahib of Mysore. Since it appeared that the success of the siege would be decided by naval action, 1,200 troops were embarked onto Suffren's ships to increase his gunnery complement. His fleet weighed anchor on 18 June, and the two fleets began maneuvering for advantage.

== Battle ==
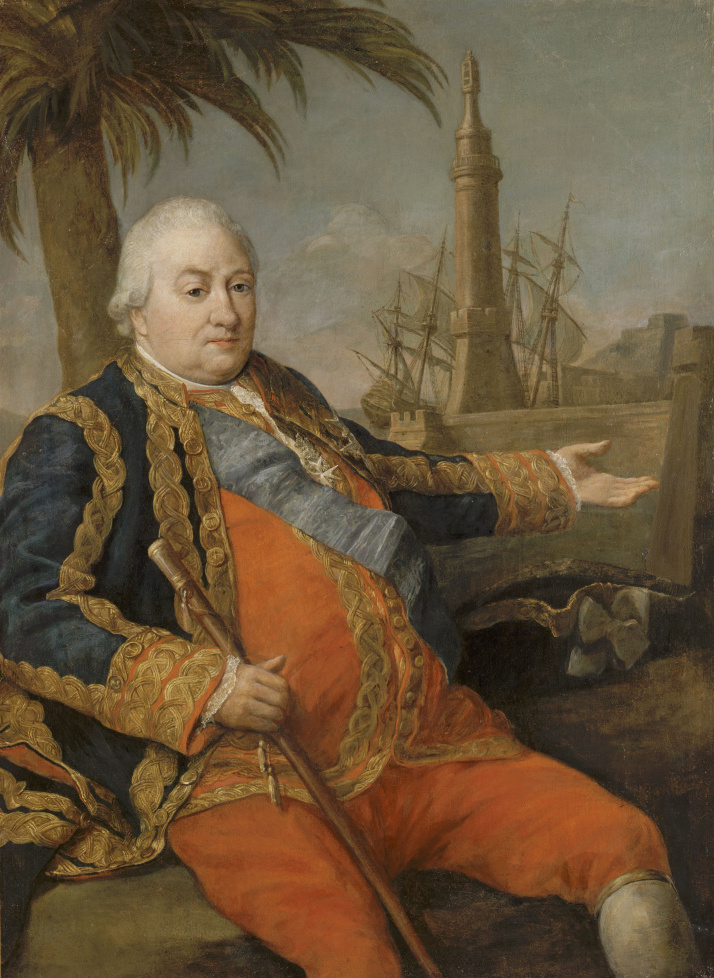
Portrait of Suffren by Pompeo Batoni

Both fleets were at first frustrated by light and variable winds. When a consistent west wind developed on 20 June, Hughes lined-up for battle on a northward-trending port tack and awaited Suffren's action. Lining-up in a similar formation, Suffren gave to the order to attack, and battle was engaged shortly after four in the afternoon. The action lasted about three hours resulting in no major damage to ships in either fleet, despite all ships being engaged.

== Aftermath ==
Suffren's fleet anchored about 25 nautical miles north of Cuddalore after the battle, while Hughes anchored near the city. On 22 June, Hughes sighted the French fleet while he was en route to Madras; a number of his ships had been disabled, and he reported that many men were suffering from scurvy and that he was short of water.

Suffren returned to Cuddalore on 23 June, forcing the British supply fleet to withdraw. In addition to returning the 1,200 troops he had borrowed from the city's garrison, he landed an additional 2,400 men to support the defense. A sortie from the city was repelled but weakened the besieging British, and on 29 June a British ship flying under a truce flag brought news of a preliminary peace agreement between the two nations, resulting in a mutually-agreed suspension of hostilities on 2 July.

== Order of battle ==
French van squadron
Ship	Rate	Guns	Navy	Commander	Casualties			Notes
Ship	Rate	Guns	Navy	Commander	Killed	Wounded	Total	Notes
Sphinx	64-gun	64	Ensign of the French Royal Navy	Captain du Chilleau				
Brillant	64-gun	64	Ensign of the French Royal Navy	Lieutenant de Kersauson				
Fendant	74-gun	74	Ensign of the French Royal Navy	Captain Thomassin de Peynier (Captain of the fleet); Captain Armand de Saint-Félix (Flag captain) (WIA)				
Flamand	54-gun	54	Ensign of the French Royal Navy	Lieutenant Perier de Salvert †				
Ajax	64-gun	64	Ensign of the French Royal Navy	Captain Dupas de la Mancelière †				
Fine	frigate	32	Ensign of the French Royal Navy					
Casualties:

French centre squadron
Ship	Rate	Guns	Navy	Commander	Casualties			Notes
Ship	Rate	Guns	Navy	Commander	Killed	Wounded	Total	Notes
Petit Annibal	50-gun	50	Ensign of the French Royal Navy	Captain Jean André de Pas de Beaulieu				
Argonaute	74-gun	74	Ensign of the French Royal Navy	Captain de Clavières				
Héros	74-gun	74	Ensign of the French Royal Navy	Major de Moissac				
Illustre	74-gun	74	Ensign of the French Royal Navy	Captain Bruyères de Chalabre				
Saint Michel	60-gun	60	Ensign of the French Royal Navy	Captain de Beaumont-Lemaître				
Cléopâtre	frigate	32	Ensign of the French Royal Navy	Captain Suffren				
Casualties:

French rear squadron
Ship	Rate	Guns	Navy	Commander	Casualties			Notes
Ship	Rate	Guns	Navy	Commander	Killed	Wounded	Total	Notes
Vengeur	64-gun	64	Ensign of the French Royal Navy	Captain de Cuverville				
Sévère	64-gun	64	Ensign of the French Royal Navy	Lieutenant de Maurville de Langle				
Annibal	74-gun	74	Ensign of the French Royal Navy	Captain d'Aymar				
Hardi	64-gun	64	Ensign of the French Royal Navy	Captain Cramezel de Kerhué				
Artésien	64-gun	64	Ensign of the French Royal Navy	Captain de Vignes d'Arrac				
Consolante	frigate	40	Ensign of the French Royal Navy	Lieutenant de Costebelle				
Coventry	frigate	28	Ensign of the French Royal Navy					
Casualties:

British van squadron
Ship	Rate	Guns	Navy	Commander	Casualties			Notes
Ship	Rate	Guns	Navy	Commander	Killed	Wounded	Total	Notes
HMS Defence	Third rate	74	Ensign of the British Royal Navy	Captain Thomas Newnham	7	38	45	
HMS Isis	Fourth rate	50	Ensign of the British Royal Navy	Captain Christopher Halliday	3	30	33	
HMS Gibraltar	Third rate	80	Ensign of the British Royal Navy	Commodore Sir Richard Bickerton; Captain Thomas Hicks	6	40	46	
HMS Inflexible	Third rate	64	Ensign of the British Royal Navy	Captain John Whitmore Chetwynd	3	30	33	
HMS Exeter	Third rate	64	Ensign of the British Royal Navy	Captain John Smith	4	9	13	
HMS Active	Fifth rate	32	Ensign of the British Royal Navy					
Casualties:

British centre squadron
Ship	Rate	Guns	Navy	Commander	Casualties			Notes
Ship	Rate	Guns	Navy	Commander	Killed	Wounded	Total	Notes
HMS Worcester	Third rate	64	Ensign of the British Royal Navy	Captain Charles Hughes	8	32	40	
HMS Africa	Third rate	64	Ensign of the British Royal Navy	Captain Robert McDougall	5	25	30	
HMS Sultan	Third rate	74	Ensign of the British Royal Navy	Captain Andrew Mitchell	4	20	24	
HMS Superb	Third rate	74	Ensign of the British Royal Navy	Vice-Admiral Sir Edward Hughes; Captain Henry Newcome	12	41	53	
HMS Monarca	Third rate	68	Ensign of the British Royal Navy	Captain John Gell	6	14	20	
HMS Burford	Third rate	64	Ensign of the British Royal Navy	Captain Peter Rainier	10	20	30	
HMS Sceptre	Third rate	64	Ensign of the British Royal Navy	Captain Samuel Graves	17	47	64	
HMS Medea	Sixth rate	28	Ensign of the British Royal Navy	Captain Erasmus Gower				
Casualties:

British rear squadron
Ship	Rate	Guns	Navy	Commander	Casualties			Notes
Ship	Rate	Guns	Navy	Commander	Killed	Wounded	Total	Notes
HMS Magnanime	Third rate	64	Ensign of the British Royal Navy	Captain Thomas Mackenzie	1	16	17	
HMS Eagle	Third rate	64	Ensign of the British Royal Navy	Captain William Clark	4	8	12	
HMS Hero	Third rate	74	Ensign of the British Royal Navy	Commodore Richard King; Captain Theophilus Jones	5	21	26	
HMS Bristol	Fourth rate	50	Ensign of the British Royal Navy	Captain James Burney	0	10	10	
HMS Monmouth	Third rate	64	Ensign of the British Royal Navy	Captain James Alms	2	19	21	
HMS Cumberland	Third rate	74	Ensign of the British Royal Navy	Captain William Allen	2	11	13	
Casualties:

British lighter ships
Ship	Rate	Guns	Navy	Commander	Casualties			Notes
Ship	Rate	Guns	Navy	Commander	Killed	Wounded	Total	Notes
San Carlos	armed storeship	22	Ensign of the British Royal Navy	George Murray, William White				
Harriott	armed storeship	22	Ensign of the British Royal Navy	Thomas Stephenson				
HMS Chaser	sloop	18	Ensign of the British Royal Navy	Edward Buller				
HMS Juno	Fifth rate	32	Ensign of the British Royal Navy	Captain James Montagu				
HMS Medea	Fifth rate	28	Ensign of the British Royal Navy	Captain Erasmus Gower				
HMS Seahorse	Fifth rate	24	Ensign of the British Royal Navy	John Drew				
Pondicherry	troop ship	18	Ensign of the British Royal Navy	Thomas Saunders Grove				
Casualties:
