= Chevalier de La Règle =

French naval officer of the War of American Independence

Chevalier de La Règle was a French Navy officer. He notably served in Suffren's squadron during the Anglo-French War.

== Biography ==
Du Pas joined the Navy as a Garde-Marine on 19 January 1757. He was promoted to Lieutenant on 4 April 1777, and to Captain on 15 September 1782.

La Règle arrived in the Indian Ocean with the first wave of reinforcements set there after Suffren took command of the squadron, as first officer on the 74-gun Illustre under Captain Bruyères-Chalabre.

He later captained the 64-gun Ajax.

In the run-up to the Battle of Trincomalee, on 25 August 1782, Du Pas led four companies of marines to lay siege to the forts of Trincomalee.

On 9 February 1783, Suffren appointed him to the command of the 64-gun Ajax. He was killed at his station during the battle, as Ajax was bearing to HMS Inflexible.

After the war, Bruyères was praised by Bruyères, and he was amongst the captains that Suffren recommended for promotion. (Note: The list comprised d'Aymar, Bruyères, Clavières, Du Chilleau, Saint-Félix, Cuverville, Vignes d'Arrac and La Règle.) He received a 600-livre pension in recognition of his service.

== Sources and references ==
Notes

Bibliography

- Cunat, Charles (1852). Histoire du Bailli de Suffren. Rennes: A. Marteville et Lefas.
- Lacour-Gayet, Georges (1910). La marine militaire de la France sous le règne de Louis XVI. Paris: Honoré Champion.
