= Louis-Hyacinte de Cavelier de Cuverville =

- Born: 1740 Château de Cuverville, near Le Havre, France
- Died: 1819 (aged 78–79) Quintin, France
- Branch: French Navy
- Rank: honorary Rear-Admiral
- Battles / wars: Battle of Sadras; Battle of Negapatam; Battle of Trincomalee; Battle of Cuddalore

Louis-Hyacinte de Cavelier, chevalier de Cuverville (Château de Cuverville, near Le Havre, 1740 — Quintin, 1819) was a French Navy officer.

== Biography ==
Cuverville was born to an aristocratic family. He joined the Navy in 1755, was promoted to Ensign in 1761 and to Lieutenant in 1774.

In 1778, he captained the frigate Inconstante.

Cuverville served in the Indian Ocean under Rear-Admiral Suffren. He was captain of the 56-gun Flamand at the Battle of Sadras on 17 February 1782. Suffren ordered the 64-gun Ajax, under René Joseph Bouvet de Précourt, and Flamand, under Cuverville, to attack the British line to leeward. They both maneuvered to this effect, but then Tromelin, on Annibal, countermanded the order by signaling Ajax and Flamand to return to their post in the line of battle. While Ajax obeyed the order, Flamand sailed on and Saint-Félix, of Brillant, requested permission to replace Ajax.

At the Battle of Negapatam, on 6 July 1782, he engaged the much stronger HMS Hero.

In July 1782, in the wake of the Battle of Negapatam, Suffren appointed Cuverville to the 64-gun Vengeur in replacement of her former captain, Forbin. Lieutenant Éléonor Jacques Marie Stanislas Perier de Salvert replaced Cuverville on Flamand. Cuverville then captained Vengeur during the Battle of Trincomalee between 25 August and 3 September 1782, and during the Battle of Cuddalore on 20 June 1783.

After the war, he was amongst the captains that Suffren recommended for promotion (Note: The list comprised d'Aymar, Bruyères, Clavières, Du Chilleau, Saint-Félix, Cuverville, Vignes d'Arrac and La Règle.) He received a 600-livre pension in recognition of his service.

In 1791, he briefly commanded a squadron in Brest, before fleeing to Essen.

At the Bourbon Restoration, he was made an honorary Rear-Admiral. He died in Quintin in 1819.

== Sources and references ==
Notes

Bibliography

- Cunat, Charles (1852). Histoire du Bailli de Suffren. Rennes: A. Marteville et Lefas. p. 447.
- Lacour-Gayet, G. (1910). La marine militaire de la France sous le règne de Louis XV. Paris: Honoré Champion.
- Levot, Prosper (1866). Les gloires maritimes de la France: notices biographiques sur les plus célèbres marins (in French). Bertrand.
- Roche, Jean-Michel (2005). Dictionnaire des bâtiments de la flotte de guerre française de Colbert à nos jours 1 1671 - 1870. p. 138. ISBN 978-2-9525917-0-6. OCLC 165892922.
