= Michel-Joseph Cramezel de Kerhué =

Naval officer

Michel-Joseph Cramezel de Kerhué (Guérande, 17 February 1738 — ) was a French Navy officer. He fought in the War of American Independence, and took part in the French operations in the Indian Ocean under Admiral Suffren.

== Biography ==
Kerhué joined the Navy as a Garde-Marine on 7 October 1756. He was promoted to Lieutenant on 4 April 1777.

He was the commanding officer of the 64-gun Hardi, part of the second wave of vessels sent to reinforce Suffren and his squadron in the Indian Ocean. Cramezel de Kerhué took part in the Cuddalore on 20 June 1783.

He was listed for promotion to Captain on 20 July 1782, and promoted on 15 September 1782.

== Citations and references ==
Citations

References

- Cunat, Charles (1852). Histoire du Bailli de Suffren. Rennes: A. Marteville et Lefas. p. 447.
- Lacour-Gayet, G. (1910). La marine militaire de la France sous le règne de Louis XV. Paris: Honoré Champion.
