= Charles Louis du Chilleau de La Roche =

French Navy officer of the War of American Independence

- Born: 26 May 1738 Fontenay, France
- Died: 21 August 1825 (aged 87) Paris, France
- Branch: French Navy
- Rank: contre-amiral
- Conflicts: action of 24 February 1780; Battle of Sadras; Battle of Providien; Battle of Negapatam; Battle of Trincomalee; Battle of Cuddalore

Charles Louis du Chilleau de La Roche (Fontenay, 26 May 1738 — Paris, 21 August 1825) was a French Navy officer.

== Biography ==
On 6 April 1778, with the rank of lieutenant, Du Chilleau de La Roche had command of the 32-gun frigate Diligente. He was awarded a 600-livre pension on 20 November 1778.

In late February 1779, Diligente and Boudeuse, under Du Chilleau de La Roche and Grenier respectively, captured the island of Saint Barthélemy by landing 90 soldiers from the garrison of Guadeloupe, and conducted the French invasion of Saint Martin on 29. After the Capture of Grenada, D'Estaing chose Du Chilleau to bring the news of his victory to Versailles, and ferry the captured governor, George Macartney, to be imprisoned at Limoges.

In February 1780, Du Chilleau de La Roche was given command of a squadron comprising the 64-gun Protée and Ajax and the frigate Charmante, as well as the fluyt Éléphant, escorting a convoy bound for India, with troops and ammunition. Du Chilleau had his flag on Protée, with Jean Baptiste Valmenier de Cacqueray as flag captain. In the action of 24 February 1780, the convoy encountered a British force under George Rodney, and Protée sacrificed herself to cover the retreat of her fellows. While the convoy sailed on to the Indian Ocean with Ajax, Charmante returned to Lorient to bring the news of the battle, arriving there on 3 March. Court-martialled for the loss of his ship, Du Chilleau was honourably acquitted.

Returned to France, Du Chilleau was appointed to the 64-gun Sphinx. He took part in the Battle of Sadras on 17 February 1782, the Battle of Providien on 12 April 1782, the Battle of Negapatam on 6 July 1782, the Battle of Trincomalee from 25 August to 3 September 1782, and the Battle of Cuddalore on 20 June 1783.

After the war, he was amongst the captains that Suffren recommended for promotion (Note: The list comprised d'Aymar, Bruyères, Clavières, Du Chilleau, Saint-Félix, Cuverville, Vignes d'Arrac and La Règle.) He received a 600-livre pension in recognition of his service.

On 25 August 1783, he was made a Knight in the Order of Saint Louis. In 1784 and 1785, he was employed in the harbour of Rochefort, and was promoted to Chef de Division in 1786.

In 1790, De Chilleau took command of Apollon. Soon afterwards, he was appointed to head a whole division, with his flag on Apollon and also comprising the 74-gun Jupiter, under Belugat and the 32-gun frigate Surveillante, under Sarcé.

In 1793, he was dismissed from the Navy.

== Works ==
- Du Chilleau, Alex (1815). Au Roi. Exposé des services du contre-amiral Mis Du Chilleau. Paris: Leblanc.
