= Jean-Marie Kersauson de Goasmelquin =

Naval officer

Jean-Marie Kersauson de Goasmelquin (also spelled Kersauzon and Goasmelquen) was a French Navy officer. He fought in the War of American Independence, and took part in the French operations in the Indian Ocean under Suffren.

== Biography ==
After the Battle of Negapatam, Suffren reshuffled his captains, notably appointing Beaulieu, captain of Bellone, to Brillant. After Pierrevert, Bellone 's new captain, was killed in the action of 12 August 1782, Suffren returned Beaulieu to Bellone. To replace Beaulieu on Brillant, he appointed Lieutenant de Kersauson captained Brillant.

At the Battle of Trincomalee, from 25 August to 3 September 1782, Brillant was the only ship to return from the vanguard to support the French main battle body, as ordered. However, he failed to seize the opportunity to engage the British from point-blank range, instead taking a position behind Illustre. (Note: Charles Cunat was harshly critical of Kersauson, calling him "lacking in all the skills that make a sailor, except courage", although he approved of his action at Trincomalee.)

Kersauson was promoted to Captain on 31 July 1784.
