= Charles-Alexandre de Maurville de Langle =

Naval officer

Charles-Alexandre de Maurville de Langle was a French Navy officer. He fought in the Indian Ocean under Suffren during the War of American Independence, captaining the 64-gun Sévère at the Battle of Trincomalee from 25 August to 3 September 1782, and at the Battle of Cuddalore on 20 June 1783.

== Biography ==
Charles-Alexandre de Maurville de Langle was born the third son of Marie Anne de Brach and Hippolyte Bernard Bidé de Maurville, an admiral in the French Navy. He was thus the brother of François-Joseph-Hippolyte Bidé de Maurville.

Maurville de Langle joined the Navy as a Garde-Marine on 12 November 1764. He was promoted to Lieutenant on 1 April 1778.

After Suffren relieved Cillart from command of Sévère in July 1782, in the wake of the Battle of Negapatam, he appointed Maurville de Langle to replace him.

Maurville de Langle captained Sévère at the Battle of Trincomalee from 25 August to 3 September 1782, and at the Battle of Cuddalore on 20 June 1783. Suffren was not impressed by his performance.

On 26 January 1784, Sévère was wrecked at the Cape of Good Hope. Consequently, he was retired from the Navy on 25 July.

== Sources and references ==
Notes

Bibliography

- Cunat, Charles (1852). Histoire du Bailli de Suffren. Rennes: A. Marteville et Lefas.
- Lacour-Gayet, G. (1910). La marine militaire de la France sous le règne de Louis XV. Paris: Honoré Champion.
