= Battle of Trincomalee =

Battle fought between a British fleet and a French fleet off the coast of Trincomalee

- Part of the American Revolutionary War
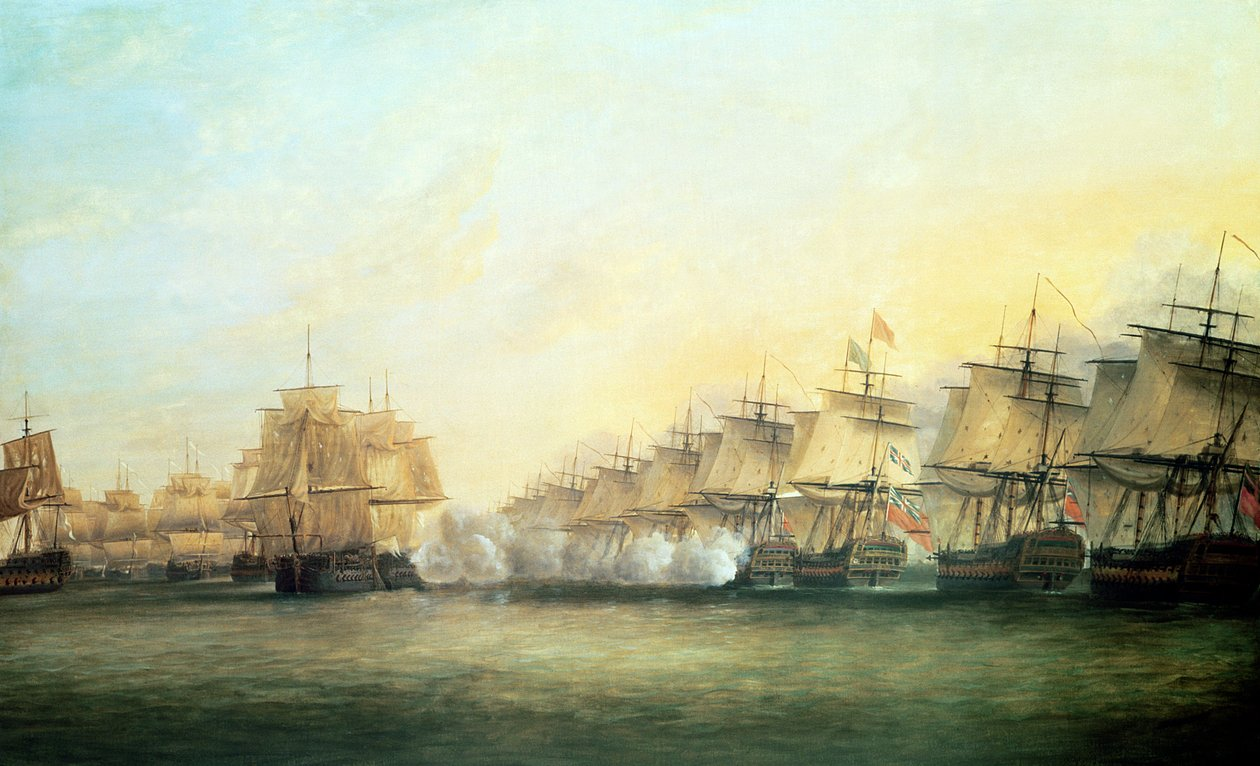
- 1782 painting of the battle by Dominic Serres
Date	25 August – 3 September 1782
Location	Off Trincomalee, Indian Ocean 8°32′56.79″N 81°14′15.78″E
Result	Inconclusive

Belligerents
Great Britain	France

Commanders and leaders
Edward Hughes	Pierre André de Suffren

Strength
12 ships of the line	14 ships of the line

Casualties and losses
51 killed 283 wounded	82 killed 255 wounded

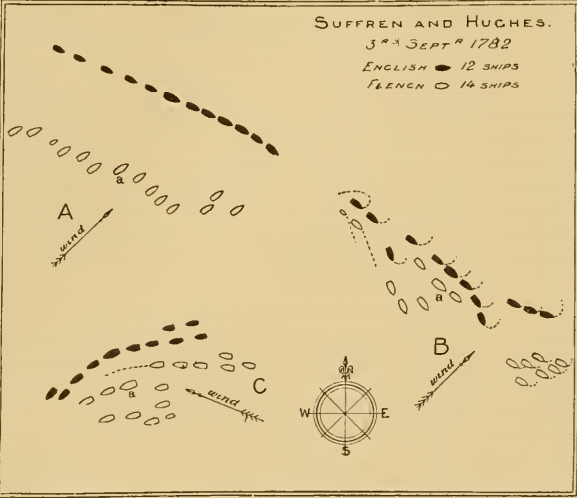
Plan of the battle (British units - black, French - white)

The Battle of Trincomalee was fought between a British fleet under Vice-Admiral Sir Edward Hughes and a French fleet under the Bailli de Suffren off the coast of Trincomalee, then Ceylon (modern Sri Lanka), on 3 September 1782. It was the fourth in a series of battles fought between the two fleets off the coast of the Indian subcontinent during the American Revolutionary War.

== Background ==
France had entered the American Revolutionary War in 1778, and Britain declared war on the Dutch Republic in late 1780 after the Dutch refused to stop trading in military supplies with the French and the Americans. The British had rapidly gained control over most French and Dutch outposts in India when news of these events reached India, spawning the Second Anglo-Mysore War in the process.

The French admiral, the Bailli de Suffren, was dispatched on a mission to provide military assistance to French colonies in India. He arrived in February 1782 and immediately engaged the British fleet of Vice-Admiral Hughes in the inconclusive Battle of Sadras. After both fleets spent time in port repairing, refitting, and revictualing, they met again in the April Battle of Providien, south of the Ceylonese port of Trincomalee, which was ended by a storm and then nightfall. Hughes put into Trincomalee, a formerly Dutch port the British had captured in January, for repairs, while Suffren went to the Dutch-controlled port of Batticaloa. Suffren and Hughes then met a third time off Negapatam, again with inconclusive results, after which Suffren anchored off Cuddalore to make repairs.

Due to the exposed nature of the anchorage at Cuddalore, and the impending arrival of additional British fleets, Suffren decided to attempt the capture of Trincomalee to gain a safe harbour for his fleet where he might effect more substantial repairs to his fleet. (He had already cannibalized prize ships and transports, as well as housing in Cuddalore, to make repairs.) Suffren was meeting with Hyder Ali near Cuddalore on 28 July when Lézard brought news of the arrival of a French fleet near the southern end of Ceylon. This fleet included two ships of the line, a frigate, and transports carrying 800 troops and their supplies. He immediately sailed for Batticaloa. On 21 August 1782, Ilustre and Saint-Michel arrived there, making their junction with Suffren's squadron. They were escorting 8 transports and preceded by the corvette Fortune, under Lusignan. The next day, after ammunition and supplies were distributed among Suffren's ships, they sailed for Trincomalee, where they anchored the same evening.

== Trincomalee captured ==
On 25 August, after studying the defenses, Suffren landed 2,400 men east of the main fortifications. Gun batteries were set up the next day, which then bombarded the fort for three days, until the wall was breached. Captain MacDowall, the British commander, was summoned to surrender on 30 August. After negotiations, the fort's garrison surrendered on condition that the French transport it to Madras and allow it to continue service in the war.

French troops entered Trincomalee on 1 September. The next day, Hughes's fleet was spotted approaching the port.

== Naval battle ==
Following the battle off Negapatam, Hughes had spent two weeks at sea before putting into Madras for repairs. There he was joined by Sceptre and San Carlos. Notified by one of his scouts that the French were anchored outside Trincomalee, Hughes lifted anchor and made haste to come to the garrison's aid, but arrived one day too late.

Suffren, now safe within the harbour, held council with his captains. Some of them, led by his second-in-command, had persistently opposed offensive actions against the British, and vigorously renewed their objections to the need for combat. Suffren, after confirming that his fleet outnumbered that of Hughes, argued in favor of action, as the destruction of the British fleet would greatly simplify land operations in pursuit of objectives of the French and their Mysorean allies. He accordingly gave orders to sail out and meet the British fleet.

When they exited the harbour, Suffren gave the signal to form the battle line. This command, even after being repeated several times, was poorly executed by his recalcitrant subordinates, and only a ragged line was arranged. Frustrated by this insubordination, Suffren then gave orders to hold fire until close quarters, and tried to communicate this by firing a gun from his flagship, Héros. This shot was misinterpreted by his captains as an order to open fire, and the whole line opened fire on the British fleet, beginning the action.

The heaviest action was at the center of the lines, where Suffren and Hughes again faced off against each other. Héros was assisted by Illustre and Ajax, while Hughes, leading from Superb, was assisted by Burford, Sultan, Eagle, Hero, and Monarca. This lopsided conflict went on for about one hour before Suffren signalled for assistance. Saint-Michel and Annibal, commanded by insubordinate captains, stayed away, while Brillant eventually neared the action and gave some assistance. Thirty minutes later, Ajax was forced to withdraw with heavy damage, and was replaced by Artésien. An hour later, the situation became critical when Héros's mainmast came crashing down, and Suffren was forced to scramble to make sure the British did not think that he had struck his colours. He had also run out of ammunition, having fired 1,800 rounds at the British ships, and continued to fire powder alone in an attempt to fool the enemy.

Battle on the ends of the line went more in favour of the French. Isis, Worcester, and Monmouth were badly damaged, and Exeter, whose captain was killed in the action, was disabled.

At 5:30 pm, after about three hours of battle, the winds suddenly shifted to the advantage of the French fleet. The ships on the outer ends of their line, which had seen relatively light action, were able to bear on the battle at the center, bringing a new intensity to the battle. Hero lost her mainmast and mizzenmast, and Worcester lost her maintopmast. A number of British ships were disabled before night fell and darkness ended the battle.

== Aftermath ==
While accounts differ, it appears likely that Suffren may have attempted to give chase when Hughes drew his fleet off and made for Madras. The French fleet entered Trincomalee harbour and began working to repair the extensive damage to the fleet. The damage to the British fleet was so severe that land commanders at Madras recalled troops from the field in case the French attempted an attack there.

As he had following the battle of Negapatam, Suffren arrested three of his captains and sent them to Île de France for punishment for their performance in the battle. This performance was so noteworthy that even the British commented on it: the Calcutta Gazette reported that Suffren was very poorly supported by his subordinates, and one commentator wrote that they were "unworthy to serve so great a man."

Suffren sailed from Trincomalee on 30 September, arriving at Cuddalore on 4 October. Eleven days later, he sailed for winter quarters in Achin, where he arrived on 7 November.

Hughes, who did not want to remain in the exposed anchorage of Madras during the monsoon season, sailed for Bombay. His whole fleet suffered through the early days of the monsoon, and some ships took two months to arrive there.

== Order of battle ==
French van squadron
Ship	Rate	Guns	Navy	Commander	Casualties			Notes
Ship	Rate	Guns	Navy	Commander	Killed	Wounded	Total	Notes
Artésien	64-gun	64	Kingdom of France	Captain Armand de Saint-Félix	4	12	16	
Sévère	64-gun	64	Kingdom of France	Lieutenant de Maurville de Langle	0	0	0	
Saint-Michel	60-gun	60	Kingdom of France	Captain d'Aymar (Captain of the fleet)	2	0	2	
Orient	74-gun	74	Kingdom of France	Captain de la Pallière	0	0	0	
Brillant	64-gun	64	Kingdom of France	Lieutenant de Kersauson	5	8	13	
Fortune	sloop	10	Kingdom of France	Lieutenant Lusignan				
Casualties: 11 killed, 20 wounded, 31 total

French centre squadron
Ship	Rate	Guns	Navy	Commander	Casualties			Notes
Ship	Rate	Guns	Navy	Commander	Killed	Wounded	Total	Notes
Petit Annibal	50-gun	50	Kingdom of France	Captain Morard de Galles	0	0	0	
Sphinx	64-gun	64	Kingdom of France	Captain du Chilleau	0	0	0	
Héros	74-gun	74	Kingdom of France	Captain Suffren; Major de Moissac (flag captain)	30	72	102	Lieutenant de frégate Dubusquet had a leg shot off; Lieutenant de frégate Amieth was gravely wounded; Lieutenant de frégate Dulac lost his right eye.
Illustre	74-gun	74	Kingdom of France	Captain Bruyères de Chalabre	24	82	106	Captain de Bruyères had contusions to the chest. Lieutenant de Vautrou was killed. Ensign de Saint-Ligier was killed. Lieutenant Danharloo (Swedish national) had a thigh shot off. Ensign de Cardignan and Ensign de Beaupoil were lightly wounded. Officers of the Régiment de l'Île-de-France de la Tourhodis and de Séguin were lightly wounded.
Flamand	54-gun	54	Kingdom of France	Lieutenant Périer de Salvert	1	13	14	
Bellone	frigate	32	Kingdom of France	Captain Jean André de Pas de Beaulieu				
Casualties: 55 killed, 167 wounded, 222 total

French rear squadron
Ship	Rate	Guns	Navy	Commander	Casualties			Notes
Ship	Rate	Guns	Navy	Commander	Killed	Wounded	Total	Notes
Ajax	64-gun	64	Kingdom of France	Lieutenant de Beaumont le Maître	10	24	34	
Consolante	frigate	40	Kingdom of France	Lieutenant Péan de la Villehunault †				Although Consolante was only a frigate, Suffren put her in the line of battle to alleviate his numerical inferiority.
Annibal	74-gun	74	Kingdom of France	Captain de Tromelin (Captain of the fleet)	0	0	0	
Vengeur	64-gun	64	Kingdom of France	Captain de Cuverville	1	20	21	
Bizarre	64-gun	64	Kingdom of France	Captain la Landelle-Roscanvec	2	16	18	Ensign de la Grandière severely wounded to a leg.
Casualties: 13 killed, 60 wounded, 73 total

Total losses of the French squadrons: 82 killed, 255 wounded

British squadron
Ship	Rate	Guns	Navy	Commander	Casualties			Notes
Ship	Rate	Guns	Navy	Commander	Killed	Wounded	Total	Notes
HMS Exeter	Fourth rate	64		Captain King				
HMS Isis	Fourth rate	50		Captain Lumley				
HMS Hero	Third rate	74		Captain Hawker				
HMS Sceptre	Fourth rate	64		Captain Graves				
HMS Burford	Fourth rate	64		Captain Peter Rainier				
HMS Sultan	Third rate	74		Captain Walt				
HMS Superb	Third rate	74		Admiral Edward Hughes; Captain Newcome (flag captain)				
HMS Monarca	Third rate	74		Captain John Gell				
HMS Eagle	Fourth rate	64		Captain Reddal				
HMS Magnanime	Fourth rate	64		Captain Mackensie				
HMS Monmouth	Fourth rate	64		Captain James Alms				
HMS Worcester	Fourth rate	64		Captain Hughes				
Casualties:

British light ship attached
Ship	Rate	Guns	Navy	Commander	Casualties			Notes
Ship	Rate	Guns	Navy	Commander	Killed	Wounded	Total	Notes
San Carlos (?)		44						
HMS Active	Fifth rate	40						
HMS Medea	Fifth rate	28						
HMS Coventry	Fifth rate	28						
HMS Seahorse	Fifth rate	24						
HMS Combustion	Fifth rate	10						
Casualties:

Total losses of the British squadrons: 51 killed, 285 wounded

== Sources ==
- Cunat, Charles (1852). Histoire du Bailli de Suffren. Rennes: A. Marteville et Lefas. p. 447.
- Malleson, George Bruce (1884). Final French Struggles in India and on the Indian Seas. W.H. Allen.
