= Chevalier de Clavières =

Naval officer

Chevalier de Clavières (born in Guérande on 17 February 1738) was a French Navy officer. He fought in the War of American Independence, and taking part in the French operations in the Indian Ocean under Suffren.

== Biography ==
Kerhué joined the Navy as a Garde-Marine on 7 October 1756. He was promoted to Lieutenant on 4 April 1777.

In 1778, he served as first officer on the 74-gun Hector, part of the fleet under Admiral d'Estaing.

He commanded the 74-gun Argonaute in the Cuddalore on 20 June 1783. Suffren was pleased with his performance and recommended him for a 1000-livre pension.

After the war, he was amongst the captains who Suffren recommended for promotion. (Note: The list comprised d'Aymar, Bruyères, Clavières, Du Chilleau, Saint-Félix, Cuverville, Vignes d'Arrac and La Règle.) He received a 600-livre pension in recognition of his service.

== Bibliography ==
- Cunat, Charles (1852). Histoire du Bailli de Suffren. Rennes: A. Marteville et Lefas. p. 447.
- Lacour-Gayet, G. (1910). La marine militaire de la France sous le règne de Louis XV. Paris: Honoré Champion.
