= French fluyt Salomon =

French naval ship, wrecked 1784

History

France
- Name: Salomon
- Builder: Nantes
- Laid down: 1761
- Launched: 1762
- Commissioned: August 1762
- Out of service: 1779.
- Reinstated: 1781.
- Fate: Wrecked in 1784

General characteristics
- Displacement: 230 tonnes
- Length: 25.7 metres
- Beam: 8.4 metres
- Propulsion: Sail
- Armament: 6 to 12 guns

Salomon was merchantman built in Nantes that the French Royal Navy purchased and commissioned as a fluyt. In 1781, she was reclassified as a fireship and renamed Pulvérisateur, and served in the Indian Ocean in Suffren's squadron under capitaine de brûlot Villaret de Joyeuse.

== Career ==
In August 1762, the French Navy purchased Salomon in Nantes. On 14 April, she arrived in Rochefort under Deschenais. In 1764, she was under Chevalier Charles de Pradel de Lamaze, who died aboard on 11 July 1764. From August 1767 she was used as a gunnery school at Ile d'Aix, before being loaned as a merchantman from 1768, first to private individuals, and then to the Compagnie de Cayenne in April 1770.

In 1771, she underwent a refit in Rochefort. She was in Martinique in 1773 under Gilart de Larchantel.

Salomon was sold in 1779.

In August 1781, she was in India when the French Navy repurchased her. In October, she became the fireship Pulvérisateur under capitaine de brûlot Villaret de Joyeuse, part of the squadron under Suffren.

On 24 April 1782, Pulvérisateur, after encountering Fine, joined with Suffren's squadron and delivered copies of the despatches originally sent by Navy Minister Castrie on 21 July 1781, and that had been destroyed with Expédition.

Pulvérisateur took part in the Battle of Negapatam on 6 July 1782. After the battle, her rigging was dismantled to replace parts on Suffren's ships of the line, and she received herself parts from the rigging of Yarmouth and from another prize as replacement.

On 23 September 1782, in the wake of the Battle of Trincomalee, Suffren sent Pulvérisateur to Isle de France under M. Le Fer to bring despatches to Governor François de Souillac. Having requested to be relieved of duty, captains Tromelin, Saint-Félix, Morard de Galles and la Landelle-Roscanvec came aboard.

== Fate ==
Pulvérisateur was wrecked in 1784.
