= Charles Daniel d'Arrac de Vignes =

French navy officer

Charles Daniel d'Arrac de Vignes (24 January 1742 – ?) was a French Navy officer. He fought in the War of American Independence, and taking part in the French operations in the Indian Ocean under Suffren.

== Biography ==
Arrac de Vignes joined the Navy as a Garde-Marine on 1 February 1756. He was promoted to Lieutenant on 1 October 1773, and to Captain on 9 May 1781.

He served as first officer on the 64-gun Saint Michel, under Chevalier d'Aymar, when she came to reinforce the French squadron under Suffren in the Indian Ocean.

Suffren promoted him to the command of the 64-gun Artésien. He took part in the Battle of Cuddalore, where his performance satisfied Suffren.

After the war, he was amongst the captains that Suffren recommended for promotion (Note: The list comprised d'Aymar, Bruyères, Clavières, Du Chilleau, Saint-Félix, Cuverville, Vignes d'Arrac and La Règle.) He received a 600-livre pension in recognition of his service.

== Sources and references ==
Notes

Bibliography

- Cunat, Charles (1852). Histoire du Bailli de Suffren. Rennes: A. Marteville et Lefas. p. 447.
- Lacour-Gayet, G. (1910). La marine militaire de la France sous le règne de Louis XV. Paris: Honoré Champion.
- La Chesnaye Des Bois, François-Alexandre Aubert (1761). Dictionnaire généalogique, héraldique, chronologique et historique. Paris: Duchesne.
