= Félix d'Hesmivy de Moissac =

Naval officer

Félix d'Hesmivy de Moissac was a French Navy officer. He fought in the War of American Independence, earning a founding membership in the Society of the Cincinnati, and taking part in the French operations in the Indian Ocean as Suffren's flag captain.

== Biography ==
Hesmivy de Moissac was born to the family of Jean Louis Honoré d'Hesmivy de Moissac, a colonial administrator for Guadeloupe. He joined the Navy as a Garde-Marine on 12 January 1766, and was promoted to Lieutenant on 13 March 1779.

Lieutenant de Moissac fought in the Battle of Porto Praya on 16 April 1781, where his behaviour earned him the Cross of the Order of Saint Louis. On 12 February 1782, became Suffren's flag captain on the 74-gun Héros.

On 25 February 1782, Moissac was part of the French delegation to Hyder Ali.

He took part in the Battle of Sadras on 17 February 1782, the Battle of Providien on 12 April 1782, the Battle of Negapatam on 6 July 1782, the Battle of Trincomalee from 25 August to 3 September 1782, and the Battle of Cuddalore on 20 June 1783. Suffren noted his performance favourably, especially at Cuddalore, where Moissac captained aloned, as Suffren had his flag on the frigate Cléopâtre.

Hesmivy de Moissac was promoted to Captain on 15 July 1784.

== Sources and references ==
Notes

Bibliography

- Gardiner, Asa Bird (1905). The order of the Cincinnati in France. The Rhode Island state society of Cincinnati. p. 121.
- Cunat, Charles (1852). Histoire du Bailli de Suffren. Rennes: A. Marteville et Lefas.
- Lacour-Gayet, G. (1910). La marine militaire de la France sous le règne de Louis XV. Paris: Honoré Champion.
