= Louis-Esprit d'Aymar =

Naval officer

Louis-Esprit d'Aymar was a French Navy officer. He fought in the Indian Ocean under Suffren during the American Revolutionary War, captaining the 64-gun Saint Michel at the Battle of Trincomalee from 25 August to 3 September 1782, and the 74-gun Annibal at the Battle of Cuddalore on 20 June 1783.

== Biography ==
The Chevalier d'Aymar was born to the family of a treasurer from Aix-en-Provence. He joined the French Navy as a Garde-Marine on 29 September 1749. He was promoted to lieutenant on 1 May 1763, and to captain on 4 April 1777.

d'Aymar took part in the Battle of Martinique, on 17 April 1780, at the command of Saint Michel. Along with Vengeur and Destin, Saint Michel directly engaged the much stronger British HMS Sandwich, under Rodney, HMS Cornwall and HMS Suffolk. Being smallest of the ship, Saint Michel sustained especially heavy damage, and d'Aymar had his right arm shot away by a cannonball.

d'Aymar left France in November 1781 at the command of Saint Michel, part of a division also comprising the 74-gun Illustre, the frigate Consolante. The division made in junction with Suffren's squadron at Batacalo on 9 August 1782. He captained the 64-gun Saint Michel at the Battle of Trincomalee from 25 August to 3 September 1782. When Suffren reshuffled his captains after the battle, he promoted d'Aymar to the 74-gun Annibal. D'Aymar commanded her at the Battle of Cuddalore on 20 June 1783.

After the war, he was amongst the captains that Suffren recommended for promotion. (Note: The list comprised d'Aymar, Bruyères, Clavières, Du Chilleau, Saint-Félix, Cuverville, Vignes d'Arrac and La Règle.) He received a 600-livre pension in recognition of his service.

In 1791, after the duel between Lameth and Castries, d'Aymar publicly regretted that Castries had not killed Lameth. A crowd then brutalised d'Aymar.

D'Aymar was promoted to rear admiral on 1 January 1792.
