= Paul-Jacques de Bruyères-Chalabre =

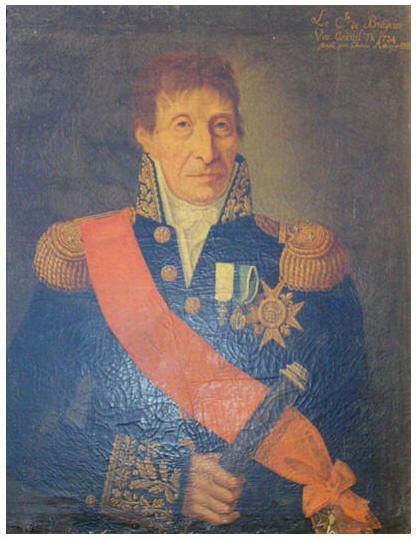
- Born: 25 May 1734; Castelnaudary, France
- Died: 6 July 1821; Chalabre, France
- Service / branch: French Navy
- Rank: vice-admiral
- Battles / wars: Yorktown campaign Siege of Savannah; Battle of Trincomalee; Battle of Cuddalore

Paul-Jacques de Bruyères-Chalabre (Castelnaudary, 25 May 1734 — Chalabre, 6 July 1821) was a French Navy officer. He notably captained the 74-gun Illustre at the Battle of Trincomalee from 25 August to 3 September 1782 and at the Battle of Cuddalore on 20 June 1783.

== Biography ==
Bruyères was born to the family of Count de Bruyères Chalabre. He joined the Navy as a Garde-Marine on 11 February 1751, and was promoted to lieutenant on 1 October 1764, and to captain on 4 April 1777.

With the rank of captain, Bruyères commanded the 80-gun Tonnant in the Yorktown campaign. He later captained the 74-gun Zélé and was part of the French blockade during the Siege of Savannah in 1779. His role in the War of American Independence earned him a membership in the Society of the Cincinnati.

He then took part in the Indian Ocean campaign under Suffren, commanding the 74-gun Illustre at the Battle of Trincomalee from 25 August to 3 September 1782, where he was wounded. Suffren made flattering reports on his conduct in the battle. He went to fight at the Battle of Cuddalore on 20 June 1783.

After the Peace of Paris put an end to the war in 1783, he returned to France in 1784. He was amongst the captains that Suffren recommended for promotion (Note: The list comprised d'Aymar, Bruyères, Clavières, Du Chilleau, Saint-Félix, Cuverville, Vignes d'Arrac and La Règle.) He received a 600-livre pension in recognition of his service. On 1 May 1786, he was promoted to Chef de Division.

Bruyères resigned from the Navy on 15 March 1792. During the Reign of Terror, he was arrested, but was released after the Thermidorian Reaction. He then fled France to become an émigré.

After the Bourbon Restoration, Bruyères-Chalabre returned to France. On 13 June 1814, he was promoted to rear admiral. In December 1814, he became a vice-admiral.

From November 1815, he served as a Deputy for Aude in the Chamber of Deputies.

== Bibliography ==
- Cunat, Charles (1852). Histoire du Bailli de Suffren. Rennes: A. Marteville et Lefas. p. 447.
- Gardiner, Asa Bird (1905). The order of the Cincinnati in France. Rennes: The Rhode Island state society of Cincinnati. p. 121.
- Lacour-Gayet, Georges (1910). La marine militaire de la France sous le règne de Louis XVI. Paris: Honoré Champion.
