= Armand de Saint-Félix =

French Navy officer

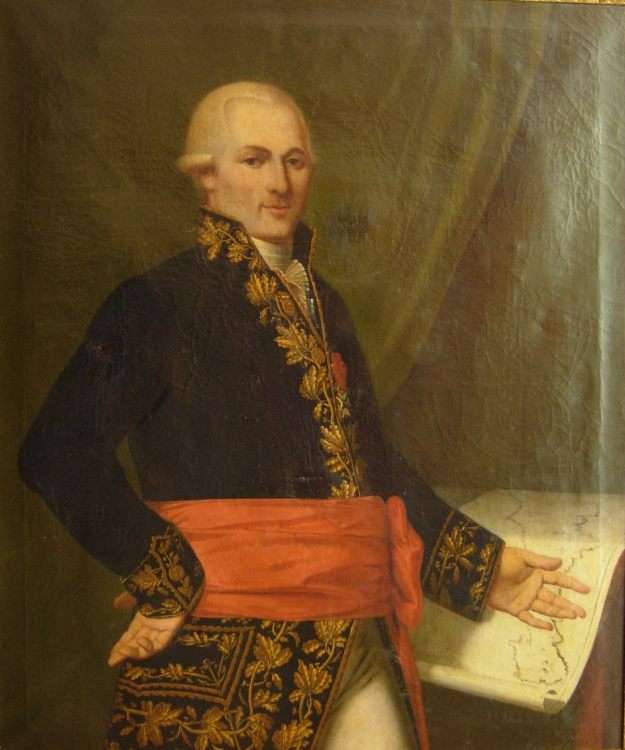
- Born: 20 September 1737
- Died: 13 August 1819
- Branch: French Navy
- Rank: Vice-Admiral
- Battles / wars: Battle of Ushant action of 24 February 1780; Battle of Sadras; Battle of Providien; Battle of Negapatam; Battle of Trincomalee; Battle of Cuddalore

Armand de Saint-Félix (20 September 1737 – 13 August 1819) was a French Navy officer.

== Biography ==
Saint-Félix joined the Navy in 1755. he served on the 16-gun Calypso, where he took part in the Battle of Quiberon Bay on 20 November 1759. In 1762, he was promoted to Ensign. In 1771, he was appointed to command the corvette Heure de Berger and appointed to conduct an exploration voyage to seek the Phantom island of Juan de Lisboa.

Promoted to Lieutenant in 1772, he brought Maurice Benyovszky to Madagascar for an attempt at founding a trading post.

=== War of American Independence ===
During the War of American Independence, Saint-Félix served on Solitaire and took part in the Battle of Ushant. He then transferred onto Protée, and was taken prisoner when she was captured in the action of 24 February 1780.

Promoted to Captain in 1781, he was appointed to the frigate Fine and sailed to Isle de France (Mauritius). He took command of the 64-gun Brillant in the squadron of Read-Admiral Suffren, and took part in the battles of Sadras, Providien and Negapatam.

On 7 July 1782, following the Battle of Negapatam, Suffren appointed Saint-Félix to Artésien in replacement of Bidé de Maurville. He commanded her at the Battle of Trincomalee. Saint-Félix requested to be relieved and left the squadron after the Battle of Trincomalee], embarking on Pulvérisateur on 3 September 1782, bound for Isle de France. He later returned to be promoted to the command of the 74-gun Fendant which he captained during the Battle of Cuddalore on 20 June 1783, where he was wounded.

He returned to France after the Peace of Paris, commanding Flamand. After the war, he was amongst the captains that Suffren recommended for promotion (Note: The list comprised d'Aymar, Bruyères, Clavières, Du Chilleau, Saint-Félix, Cuverville, Vignes d'Arrac and La Règle.)

=== Interwar ===
Returned to France, Saint-Félix commanded the training squadron (escadre d'évolution) in 1785. In June 1786, the captained the 18-gun corvette Flèche for a cruise between Toulon and Cherbourg. In 1787 and 1788, he commanded the Eastern Mediterranean station. In 1790, he was given command of the 74-gun Tourville.

In 1791, he was promoted to Rear-Admiral and until 1792, he commanded the Indian Ocean station, with his flag on Cybèle.

=== French Revolutionary wars ===
In 1793, Saint-Félix was promoted to Vice-Admiral. The same year, he was arrested, and spent 16 months in prison.

He returned to France in 1810 after squandering a considerable fortune that belonged to his wife.

=== Restoration ===
At the Bourbon restoration, Louis XVIII made Saint-Félix a Commander in the Order of Saint Louis.

== Sources and references ==
Notes

Bibliography

- Cunat, Charles (1852). Histoire du Bailli de Suffren. Rennes: A. Marteville et Lefas. p. 447.
- Lacour-Gayet, G. (1910). La marine militaire de la France sous le règne de Louis XV. Paris: Honoré Champion.
- Levot, Prosper (1866). Les gloires maritimes de la France: notices biographiques sur les plus célèbres marins (in French). Bertrand.
- Roche, Jean-Michel (2005). Dictionnaire des bâtiments de la flotte de guerre française de Colbert à nos jours 1 1671 - 1870. p. 138. ISBN 978-2-9525917-0-6. OCLC 165892922.
- Taillemite, Étienne (2002). Dictionnaire des Marins français. Tallandier. ISBN 2-84734-008-4. OCLC 606770323.
