= French ship Sévère (1778) =

Ship of the line of the French Navy

History

France
- Name: Sévère
- Builder: Lorient
- Laid down: December 1773
- Launched: 17 January 1775
- In service: November 1778
- Out of service: 26 January 1784
- Fate: Wrecked 26 January 1784

General characteristics
- Class & type: Sévère class ship of the line
- Displacement: 2,250 tonneaux
- Tons burthen: 1,300 port tonneaux
- Length: 51.2 metres
- Beam: 13.2 metres
- Draught: 6.7 metres
- Propulsion: Sails
- Sail plan: Full-rigged ship
- Armament: 64 guns

Sévère was a 64-gun ship of the line of the French Navy.

== Career ==
Built as an Indiaman by Roth on the lines of a previous ship, Superbe, that had been sold to the Austrian East India Company, Sévère was purchased by the Crown in November 1778 and commissioned for the American Revolutionary War.

She was incorporated into Suffren's squadron. She took part in the Battle of Negapatam in 1782, under Captain Villeneuve-Cillart; during the battle, Cillart panicked and attempted to strike, but was prevented from doing so by officers Dieu and Kerlero de Rosbo. Sévère ended up causing damage to HMS Sultan. (Note: When known in France, the anecdote yielded the pun that "Villeneuve-Cilart wanted to surrender, but "God" (Dieu, the name of the insubordinate officer) would not allow it". Dieu would be killed on Sévère at the Battle of Cuddalore on 20 June 1783.)

In July 1782, in the wake of the Battle of Negapatam, Suffren relieved Cillart from duty and sent him to France to be Court-martialled, replacing him with Lieutenant Maurville de Langle. Maureville de Langle then captained Sévère during the Battle of Trincomalee between 25 August and 3 September 1782, and during the Battle of Cuddalore on 20 June 1783.

== Fate ==
Sévère was later armed en flûte, and was wrecked on 26 January 1784 at the Cape of Good Hope. Consequently, Maurville de Langle was retired from the Navy on 25 July.
