= French ship Orient (1756) =

Ship of the line of the French Navy

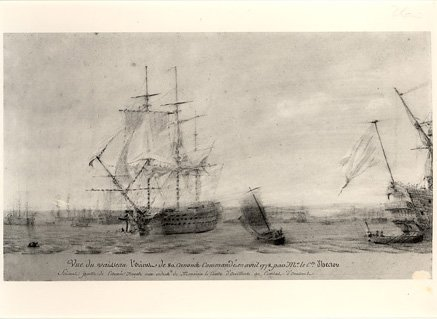
- Orient being reduced to a 74-gun

History

France
- Name: Orient
- Laid down: April 1756
- Launched: 9 October 1756
- Acquired: May 1759
- Fate: Wrecked, February 1782

General characteristics
- Displacement: 3000 tonneaux
- Tons burthen: 1800 port tonneaux
- Length: 56.5 metres
- Beam: 14.5 metres
- Draught: 6.8 metres
- Sail plan: Full-rigged ship
- Complement: 12 to 15 officers; 650 to 734 men
- Armament: 28 × 36-pounder long guns; 30 × 18-pounder long guns; 16 × 8-pounder long guns

Orient was an 74-gun ship of the line of the French Navy, built by Antoine Groignard.

== Career ==
Orient was built in Lorient for the French East India Company by Antoine Groignard, from April 1756 (Note: Ronald Deschênes gives 1750 as year of construction.) to August 1759. The French Royal Navy purchased her in May 1759. Originally intended as an 80-gun, she was reduced to a 74-gun in early 1766.

On 14 November 1759, under Captain Guébriant, Orient was part of a 20-ship fleet under Hubert de Brienne attempting invasion of Cornwall. She took part in the subsequent Battle of Quiberon Bay.

Orient underwent a refit in Brest in 1766, and again from 1777 to April 1778. The same year, with the outbreak of the Anglo-French War, she took part in the Battle of Ushant.

On 28 December 1778, under Thomas d'Estienne d'Orves, she sailed from Brest to reinforce the French colony of Isle de France (Mauritius) arriving in September 1779, her crew suffering from scurvy. In 1779, she captured the British privateer Vigilant of Bristol, Marshall, master, and brought her to Lorient.

By April 1781, Estienne d'Orves's health had deteriorated to the point where First Officer Bolle was in effective command. After Estienne d'Orves died on 9 February 1782, Suffren put Captain Lapallière (Note: Sometimes spelt "la Pallière") in command.

In 1782, as present at the Battle of Negapatam on 6 July 1782, although she did not take part in the action, and took part in the Battle of Trincomalee between 25 August and 3 September 1782.

In the wake of the Battle of Trincomalee, she was wrecked near Trincomalee in Sri Lanka on 8 September 1782, around 0400, when Ensign Jean Anne Christy de La Pallière insisted to sail on his tack rather to effect a turn as the master pilot advised. Orient touched a rock at Pointe-Sale and stopped. She fired a gun to ask for help, and the rest of Suffren's squadron anchored nearby to provide assistance, but as Orient refloated, she ran into another rock nearby and became a total loss. Part of her rigging was used as spare parts to repair Illustre and Héros. The responsible officer, Ensign Christy de La Pallière, who was the son of Orient's Captain Jean Baptiste Christy de La Pallière, was dismissed from the Navy.
