= Bernard-Marie Boudin de Tromelin =

French Navy officer (1735–1815)

- Born: 15 February 1735; Morlaix, France
- Died: 4 December 1815; Lyon, France
- Service / branch: French Navy
- Rank: vice-admiral
- Battles / wars: Battle of Cape Finisterre; Battle of Providien; Battle of Trincomalee

Bernard-Marie Boudin de Tromelin (Morlaix, 15 February 1735 — Lyon, 4 December 1815) was a French Navy officer.

== Biography ==
Born to Marie-Françoise Le Diouguel de Penanru and Jacques Boudin de Tromelin, Tromelin started his career in the army as a lieutenant in the régiment du Limousin, and taking part in the Siege of Maastricht.

Tromelin joined the navy as a Garde-Marine on 6 July 1750. On 11 October 1755, he was promoted to ensign. He served on the 22-gun frigate Hermine from 7 December 1760 to 26 November 1761 under Lieutenant Toussaint Julien Auffray du Guélambert, taking part in the Battle of Cape Finisterre on 13 and 14 August 1761.

Promoted to lieutenant on 1 May 1763, he took command of Normande from 29 December 1767 to July 1770. On 24 April 1769, he was admitted as a member of the Académie de Marine. From 2 March 1771 to October 1783, he was in charge of improving infrastructure in Port-Louis harbour.

Promoted to captain on 4 April 1777, he was given command of the 38-gun frigate Consolante. On 10 August, he transferred to the 64-gun Brillant. On 11 November 1779, he was promoted to membre ordinaire of the Académie de Marine.

In May 1781, Read-Admiral Thomas d'Estienne d'Orves, whose health compromised the ability to command, put Tromelin in effective charge of his squadron.

On 26 October 1781, he transferred to the 74-gun Annibal, which he commanded at the Battle of Sadras on 17 February 1782, at the Battle of Providien on 12 April 1782, at the Battle of Negapatam on 6 July 1782, and at the Battle of Trincomalee on 3 September 1782.

Tromelin came in conflict with Suffren, who accused him of mounting a cabale of captains and officers against him. Several, including Saint-Félix, Morard de Galles, La Landelle and Tromelin-Lanuguy, as well as Tromelin himself, had requested a transfer Tromelin requested to be relieved and left the squadron after the Battle of Trincomalee, embarking on Pulvérisateur on 3 September 1782, bound for Isle de France.

Tromelin was expelled from the navy on 25 July 1784 and stripped of his pension. He was likewise expelled from the Académie de Marine.

Rehabilitated on 1 January 1793, he was promoted to vice-admiral, but never commanded again. He retired on 6 June 1795.

== See also ==
- Maurice Boudin de Tromelin de Launay (1740–1825), brother to Tromelin
- Jacques Marie Boudin de Tromelin de La Nuguy (1751–1798), brother to Tromelin

== Sources and references ==
Notes

Bibliography

- Cunat, Charles (1852). Histoire du Bailli de Suffren. Rennes: A. Marteville et Lefas. p. 447.
- Roussel, Claude-Youenn; Forrer, Forrer (2019). Tromelin et Suffren - Un conflit entre marins - Biographie et Mémoire justificatif inédit du capitaine de vaisseau Bernard Marie Boudin de Tromelin 1735-1815. SPM-Lettrage. p. 298. ISBN 978-2-917232-88-0.
