= Battle of Negapatam (1782) =

Naval battle in 1782

- Part of the American Revolutionary War
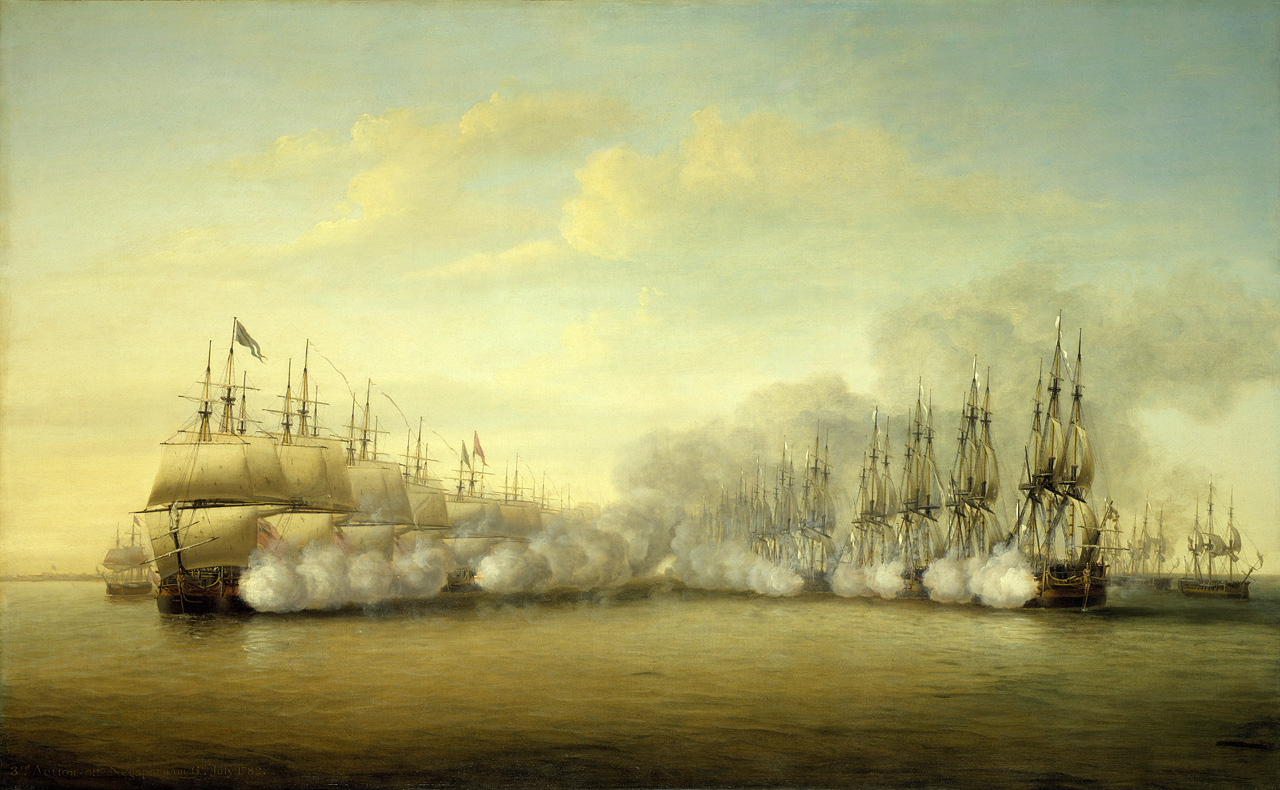
- Battle of Negapatam, 6 July 1782; Dominic Serres, 1786
| Date | 6 July 1782 |
| Location | Bay of Bengal, Indian Ocean 10°46′41″N 79°51′58″E |
| Result | Inconclusive |

Belligerents
| Great Britain | France |

Commanders and leaders
| Edward Hughes | Pierre André de Suffren |

Strength
| 11 ships of the line 1 frigate | 12 ships of the line 1 frigate 2 corvettes 1 fireship |

Casualties and losses
| 77 killed 233 wounded | 178 killed 601 wounded |

The Battle of Negapatam was the third in a series of battles fought between a British fleet, under Vice-Admiral Sir Edward Hughes, and a French fleet, under the Bailli de Suffren, off the coast of India during the American Revolutionary War. The battle was fought on 6 July 1782. Though the battle was indecisive, Suffren was stopped in his goal by Hughes and withdrew to Cuddalore, while the British remained in control of Negapatam.

== Background ==
France had entered the American Revolutionary War in 1778, and Britain declared war on the Dutch Republic in late 1780, after the Dutch refused to stop trading in military supplies with the French and the Americans. The British had rapidly gained control over most French and Dutch outposts in India when news of these events reached India, spawning the Second Anglo-Mysore War in the process. Negapatam was besieged and taken by Sir Hector Munro in November 1781.

The French admiral the Bailli de Suffren was dispatched on a mission to provide military assistance to French colonies in India. He arrived in February 1782 and immediately engaged the British fleet of Vice-Admiral Sir Edward Hughes in the inconclusive Battle of Sadras. After both fleets spent time in port repairing, refitting, and re-provisioning, they met again in the April Battle of Providien, south of the Ceylonese port of Trincomalee, that was ended by a storm and then nightfall. Hughes put into Trincomalee, a formerly Dutch port the British had captured in January, for repairs, while Suffren went to the Dutch-controlled port of Batticaloa.

While at Batticaloa, Suffren received dispatches from Île de France (now Mauritius) that ordered him to return there to escort additional French troops to India. He chose not to do so, citing the parity between the two fleets, and the need to defend French troops already on the ground in India against the movements of the British fleet.

The French, with about 2,000 effective troops under the command of Comte du Chemin, had captured Cuddalore on 6 May. Hyder Ali, the ruler of Mysore, originally wanted the French to take the more important port of Negapatam. The French joined with Hyder's army of 60,000 to lay siege to the British at Vandavasi. When the British sent an army of 12,000 toward Vandavasi to relieve the siege, du Chemin, against the wishes of Hyder, refused to engage in a battle that the Franco-Mysorean force would probably have won (which would have significantly reduced the British military presence in India). As a result, Hyder lifted the siege and retreated to the vicinity of Pondicherry.

Hyder Ali learned of Suffren's actions in the first two battles with Hughes, and sent a message to Suffren to arrange a meeting. Suffren had in the meantime sailed from Batticaloa to do the job that du Chemin would not: capture Negapatam. He stopped at Cuddalore on 20 June to take on troops and supplies for the attack, which he hoped to do by surprise. When he was ready to sail, he learned that Hughes had sailed past, apparently also en route to Negapatam. As his fleet had grown by captured prizes and arrivals from Île de France (it was now twelve ships of the line and four frigates), Suffren gave chase and caught up with Hughes, who had anchored off Negapatam, on 5 July.

== Battle ==
Suffren was in the process of forming his battle line around 3:00 pm when a squall took down the main and mizzen top masts of Ajax, under Bouvet-Précourt, forcing her to drop out of his line. When the squall calmed, the breeze was to Hughes's advantage, so he sailed from his anchorage at the harbour of Negapatam. The two fleets spent the night anchored two cannonshots apart.

The next morning, Suffren was infuriated to learn that repairs had not been made to Ajax, and that her captain wanted to retreat. Given that battle was imminent, Suffren refused. He then ordered his line to bear down on the British line for close action. As they began to move, Ajax stood away and did not join the action. At 9:30 am on 6 July, the fleets opened fire on each other, first at long range. Flamand engaged Hero and Exeter, Annibal engaged Isis, Sévère faced Burford, and Brillant opposed Sultan while the two flagships, Héros and Superb, did battle with each other. The remainder of the British line was not able to directly line up against the French, resulting in an angle in their line where Sphinx and Monarca battled that minimized the action between the ships at the end of the line. Flamand took significant damage, but was able to return the favour to its opponents. Brillant began to suffer under the fire of Sultan, but Suffren managed to detach from Héros to come to her rescue.

The battle proceeded with vigour until about 1:00 pm, when the wind suddenly changed, throwing both lines into confusion. With the wind head-on to the two parallel lines of ships, some ships turned to starboard and some to port. The majority turned away from the engagement, but six ships, four British and two French, turned in towards one another. The four British ships were the fourth, fifth, eighth and tenth in line, respectively Burford, Sultan, Worcester and Eagle; the two French were Sévère (third in line) and towards the rear of the line Brillant, which had been dismasted by this stage. Sévère was engaged by Sultan and "two other ships," and escaped through the arrival of Suffren in his flagship and the filling of her sails as she fell off to starboard, while Brillant was fired on by Worcester and Eagle, and was also rescued by the approach of Suffren's ship, though not before the loss of over a third of her complement dead or wounded.

With occasional meetings between two ships, Hughes attempted to reform his line around 2:00 pm, but neither fleet was in a state to adopt battle positions easily, so Suffren decided to draw away downwind, to the north, toward Cuddalore. One British observer noted that "our fleet was utterly incapable of preventing or pursuing them."

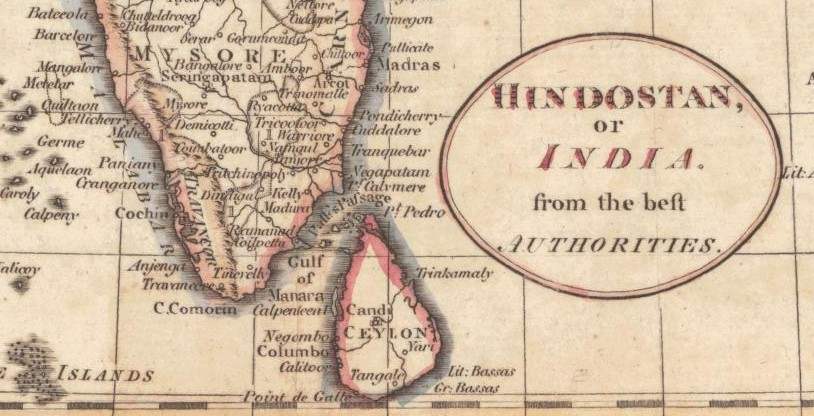
Detail of a 1794 map of south India and Ceylon. Batticaloa is north of the southeastern point of Ceylon

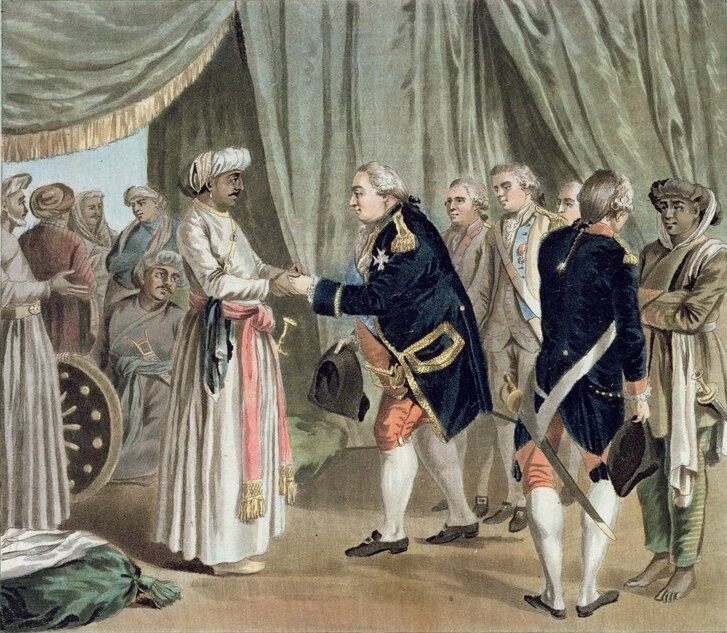
Suffren meeting with Hyder Ali in 1782, J.B. Morret engraving, 1789.

== Aftermath ==
Suffren had been thwarted in his efforts to take to Negapatam – he stripped M. Bouvet, the captain of Ajax, of his command, and arrested three others for a variety of transgressions in this battle and the previous two. One of those arrested, M. de Cillart, commander of Sévère, had started to strike his colors during one of the post-squall engagements, but his subordinates prevented the act. Suffren then sailed for Cuddalore to effect repairs. Hughes spent the next two weeks at sea, only returning to Madras for repairs on 20 July. Negapatam would remain in British hands until the end of the war. At the Treaty of Paris (1783) the Dutch Republic would cede Negapatam to Britain.

== Order of battle ==
French line of battle
| Ship | Rate | Guns | Navy | Commander | Casualties | | | Notes |
| Ship | Rate | Guns | Navy | Commander | Killed | Wounded | Total | Notes |
|---|---|---|---|---|---|---|---|---|
| Flamand | 54-gun | 54 | Kingdom of France | Captain Cavelier de Cuverville | 13 | 56 | 69 | |
| Annibal | 74-gun | 74 | Kingdom of France | Captain Boudin de Tromelin | 28 | 80 | 108 | Lieutenant de frégate de Rigny wounded |
| Sévère | 64-gun | 64 | Kingdom of France | Captain Cillart de Villeneuve | | | | First Officer Chevalier de la Salle (capitaine de brûlot) wounded. Maneuver officer De Gênes had a leg shot off. |
| Brillant | 64-gun | 64 | Kingdom of France | Captain de Saint-Félix | | | | |
| Héros | 74-gun | 74 | Kingdom of France | Captain Suffren; Major Hesmivy de Moissac (flag captain) | 25 | 72 | 97 | Duvivier, officer of the Régiment d'Austrasie, killed. |
| Sphinx | 64-gun | 64 | Kingdom of France | Captain Chilleau de La Roche (WIA) | 19 | 85 | 104 | Captain Chilleau and officers Beaulieu, La Fond and La Martellière wounded. |
| Petit Annibal | 50-gun | 50 | Kingdom of France | Captain Morard de Galles | | | | |
| Artésien | 64-gun | 64 | Kingdom of France | Captain Bidé de Maurville | | | | |
| Vengeur | 64-gun | 64 | Kingdom of France | Captain Forbin La Barben | 4 | 44 | 48 | Ensign Pommac de Bonnevie wounded. |
| Bizarre | 64-gun | 64 | Kingdom of France | Captain La Landelle de Roscanvec | | | | |
| Orient | 74-gun | 74 | Kingdom of France | Captain Christy de La Pallière | | | | |
| Ajax | 64-gun | 64 | Kingdom of France | Captain Bouvet de Précourt | | | | Was with the squadron but did not take part in the action |
Casualties: 174 killed, 601 wounded (Note: Charles Cunat gives a figure of 602 wounded.)

French light units
| Ship | Rate | Guns | Navy | Commander | Casualties | | | Notes |
| Ship | Rate | Guns | Navy | Commander | Killed | Wounded | Total | Notes |
|---|---|---|---|---|---|---|---|---|
| Diligent | corvette | 10 | Kingdom of France | Macé | | | | |
| Fine | frigate | 32 | Kingdom of France | Lieutenant Périer de Salvert | | | | |
| Subtile | corvette | 24 | Kingdom of France | Lieutenant Huon de Kermadec | | | | |
| Pulvérisateur | fireship | 6 to 12 | Kingdom of France | Lieutenant Villaret de Joyeuse | | | | |
Casualties:

British squadron
| Ship | Rate | Guns | Navy | Commander | Casualties | | | Notes |
| Ship | Rate | Guns | Navy | Commander | Killed | Wounded | Total | Notes |
|---|---|---|---|---|---|---|---|---|
| HMS Hero | Third rate | 74 | | Captain Hawker | | | | |
| HMS Exeter | Fourth rate | 64 | | Captain King | | | | |
| HMS Isis | Fourth rate | 50 | | Captain Lamley | | | | |
| HMS Burford | Fourth rate | 64 | | Captain Peter Rainier | | | | |
| HMS Sultan | Third rate | 74 | | Captain Watt | | | | |
| HMS Superb | Third rate | 74 | | Admiral Edward Hughes; Captain Stevens | | | | |
| HMS Monarca | Third rate | 74 | | Captain John Gell | | | | |
| HMS Worcester | Fourth rate | 64 | | Captain Wood | | | | |
| HMS Monmouth | Fourth rate | 64 | | Captain James Alms | | | | |
| HMS Eagle | Fourth rate | 64 | | Captain Reddal | | | | |
| HMS Magnanime | Fourth rate | 64 | | Captain Wolsely | | | | |
| HMS Seahorse | Sixth-rate | 24 | | Robert Montagu | | | | |
Casualties: 77 killed, 233 wounded
