= HMS Burford (1757) =

Ship of the line of the Royal Navy

History

Great Britain
- Name: HMS Burford
- Ordered: 19 January 1754
- Builder: Chatham Dockyard
- Laid down: 30 October 1754
- Launched: 5 May 1757
- Completed: 15 July 1757
- Commissioned: April 1757
- Decommissioned: 1784
- In service: 1757
- Out of service: 1785
- Honours and awards: Louisburg 1758; Quiberon Bay 1759; Belle Isle 1761; Sadras 1782; Providien 1782; Negapatam 1782; and Trincomalee 1782
- Fate: Sold, 31 March 1785

General characteristics
- Class & type: 1754 amendments 70-gun third rate ship of the line
- Tons burthen: 1,42439/94 (bm)
- Length: 162 ft 1 in (49.4 m) (gun deck); 134 ft 0 in (40.8 m) (keel)
- Beam: 44 ft 8 in (13.6 m)
- Depth of hold: 19 ft 8 in (6.0 m)
- Propulsion: Sails
- Sail plan: Full-rigged ship
- Complement: 520
- Armament: 70 guns: Lower deck: 28 × 32 pdrs; Upper deck: 28 × 18 pdrs; Quarterdeck: 12 × 9 pdrs; Forecastle: 2 × 9 pdrs

HMS Burford was a 70-gun third rate ship of the line of the Royal Navy, built at Chatham Dockyard to the draught specified by the 1745 Establishment as amended in 1754, and launched in 1757.

She fought in the Seven Years' War in North America (including the capture of Louisbourg) and in the western squadron under Admiral Edward Hawke, including the Battle of Quiberon Bay. After the war she spent the subsequent peace as guardship at Plymouth and a troopship to the West Indies and was repaired in 1772. In the American Revolutionary War she was sent to the East Indies from 1779 to 1784 as part of admiral Edward Hughes's squadron where she participated in all five indecisive actions against the French admiral Suffren. After her return to England in 1784 she was sold for breaking up in 1785.

== Design and construction ==
Although nominally a 70 gun third rate of the 1745 Establishment, the Burford design was heavily amended by Joseph Allin, the Surveyor of the Navy, in 1754. She was ordered on 15 January 1754 as one of two ships (her sistership was HMS Dorsetshire) which stretched the 1745 Establishment dimensions to 162 feet gundeck length and thus enabled a 14th pair of 32-pounder guns to be fitted on her lower deck (a third ship to this design - HMS Boyne - was ordered in 1758). They made up the last group of 'traditional' 70 gun ships (two other "70" gun ships - HMS Temple and HMS Conqueror - carried only 68 guns in practice, and were later reduced to 64 guns) to be built before the 74 gun ship became the standard third rate, and only differed from the new 74-gun type by carrying four fewer 9-pounder guns on the quarterdeck and forecastle. On 13 June 1754 she was named HMS Burford after her predecessors and the secondary title of George Beauclerk, 3rd Duke of St Albans and was the third and last ship of this name in the Royal Navy. She was begun by Master Shipwright Adam Hayes at Chatham Dockyard on 30 October 1754, then from August 1755 was finished by John Lock. Launched on 5 May 1757, she was completed on 15 July 1757. Her first commander was Captain James Young who commissioned her a month before launching in April 1757.

== Service history ==
Burford took an active part in the Seven Years' War, initially with Admiral Hawke in 1757. In 1758 she was commanded by Captain James Gambier (who was her captain throughout the rest of the war) at the capture of Louisberg, then in the West Indies between November 1758 and November 1759. She rejoined Hawke on 13 November 1759 just in time for the Battle of Quiberon Bay on 20 November. She remained with Hawke until 1763, seeing action at Belle Isle in 1761 and the Basque Roads in 1762.

At the end of the Seven Years' War Burford was guard ship at Plymouth from May 1763 until 1770, with two expeditions to the West Indies as a troopship in 1764 and 1768. She was paid off in March 1770 for a Middling repair at Plymouth Dockyard (costing £11,317.6.2d) between November 1769 and February 1772, before going into Ordinary until 1776.

At the start of the American Revolutionary War Burford was commissioned under Captain G Bowyer for Ireland and completed fitting out at Plymouth Dockyard in May 1777. Between March and November 1777 she was at Portsmouth Dockyard fitting for the East Indies at a cost of £11,393.9.7d. Initially commissioned in May 1778 by Captain Taylor Penny, she was taken over by Captain Peter Rainier in October of that year before sailing on 7 March 1779 for service with Rear Admiral Edward Hughes on the East Indies Station. She participated in destruction of shipping at Mangalore on 8 December 1780, and then in the battles of Sadras, Providien, Negapatam, Trincomalee and Cuddalore against the French Chef d'escadre Suffren. In 1784 she returned to England with Sir Richard king, arriving at Woolwich Dockyard on 3 July 1784.

== Fate ==
Burford was sold at Woolwich for break up for £1,320 on 31 March 1785.

== Battle honours ==
The third Burford won seven battle honours: Louisburg 1758; Quiberon Bay 1759; Belle Isle 1761; Sadras 1782; Providien 1782; Negapatam 1782; and Trincomalee 1782.
