= Fontenay, Seine-Maritime =

Fontenay
- Commune
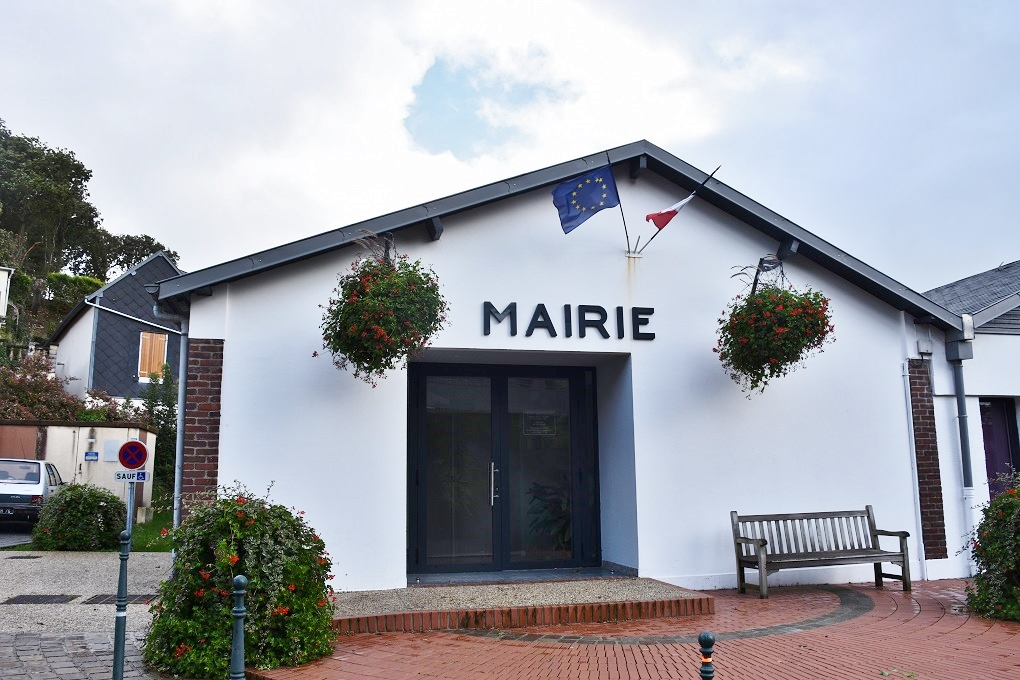
- The town hall in Fontenay

- Coat of arms
- Location of Fontenay
- Location within France Location within Normandy
- Coordinates: 49°33′41″N 0°11′01″E
- Country: France
- Region: Normandy
- Department: Seine-Maritime
- Arrondissement: Le Havre
- Canton: Octeville-sur-Mer
- Intercommunality: Le Havre Seine Métropole

Government
  - Mayor (2020–2026): Marie-Catherine Grzelczyk
- Area^{1}: 5.61 km^{2} (2.17 sq mi)
- Elevation: 69 m (226 ft)
- Highest elevation: 106 m (348 ft)
- Lowest elevation: 25 m (82 ft)
- Population (2023): 1,766
  - Density: 315/km^{2} (815/sq mi)
- Time zone: UTC+01:00 (CET)
  - Summer (DST): UTC+02:00 (CEST)
- INSEE/Postal code: 76275 /76290
- ^{1} French Land Register data, which excludes lakes, ponds, glaciers > 1 km^{2} (0.386 sq mi or 247 acres) and river estuaries.

Fontenay (French pronunciation: [fɔ̃tnɛ]) is a commune in the Seine-Maritime département in the Normandy region in northern France.

== Geography ==
A farming village situated in the Pays de Caux, some 9 miles (14 km) north of Le Havre, on the D111 road.

== Heraldry ==
Arms of Fontenay	The arms of Fontenay are blazoned : Quarternly 1&4: Argent, a two-level fountain azure; 2&3: Azure, 2 fesses Or; overall on a bend sinister gules, 3 bezants (Or).

== Population ==
Historical population
Year	Pop.	±% p.a.
1968	324	—
1975	427	+4.02%
1982	1,022	+13.28%
1990	1,123	+1.18%
1999	1,143	+0.20%
2007	1,037	−1.21%
2012	1,035	−0.04%
2017	1,240	+3.68%
2023	1,766	+6.07%
Source: INSEE

== Places of interest ==
- The church of St.Michel, dating from the eleventh century.
- The sixteenth century château du Tôt.
- The Clinarderie manorhouse.

== See also ==
- Communes of the Seine-Maritime department
