= Capture of Trincomalee =

1782 battle of the Fourth Anglo-Dutch War

- Part of the Fourth Anglo-Dutch War
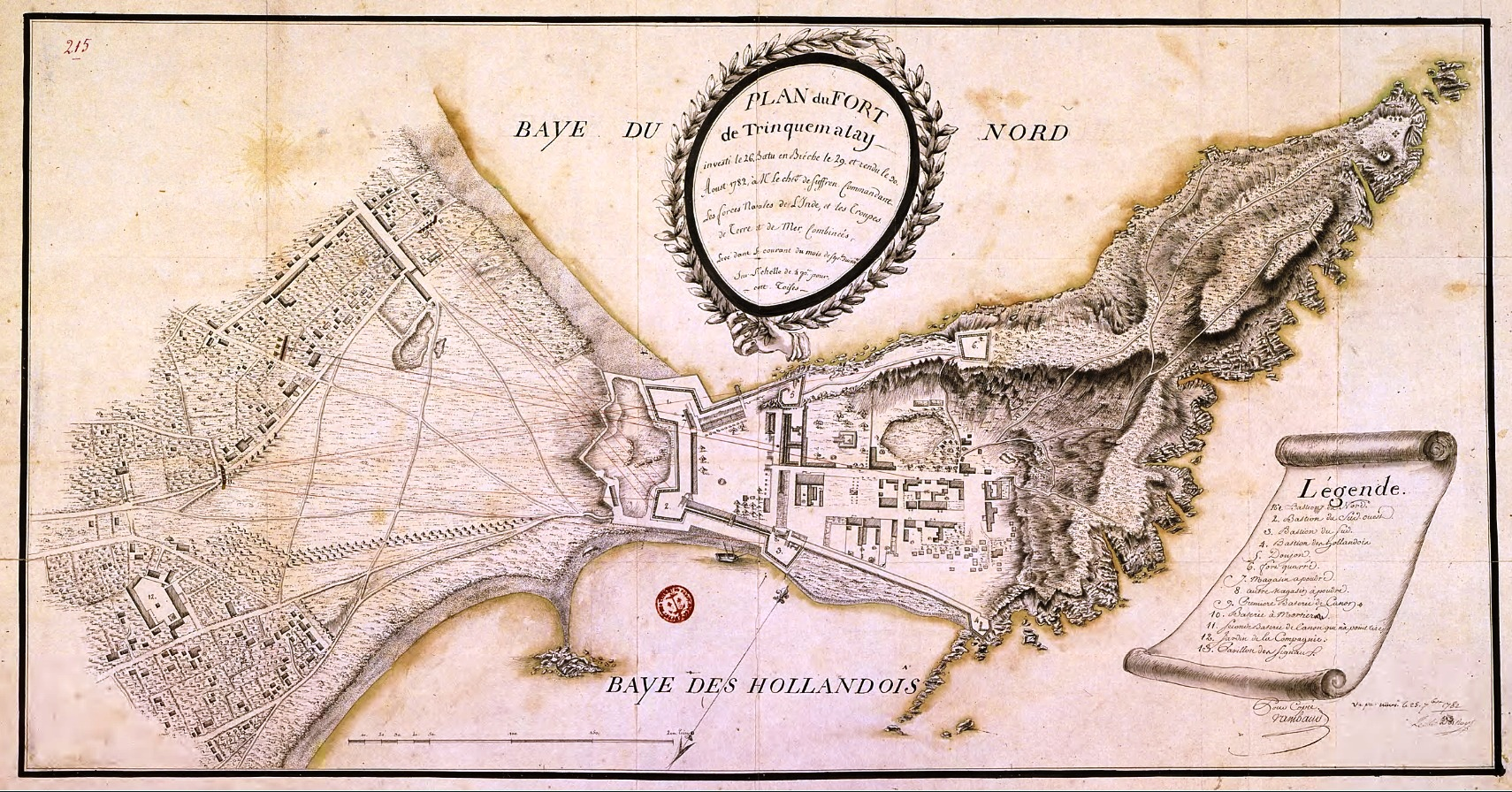
- 1782 French map of Fort Fredrick, made after Suffren recaptured the port
Date	11 January 1782
Location	Trincomalee, Dutch Ceylon 8°32′56.79″N 81°14′15.78″E
Result	British victory

Belligerents
Great Britain	Dutch East India Company

Commanders and leaders
Edward Hughes	Iman Willem Falck

Strength
800	450

Casualties and losses
21 killed 42 wounded	13 killed 430+ captured

The capture of Trincomalee on 11 January 1782 was the second major engagement between Great Britain and the Dutch East India Company in the East Indies after the outbreak of the Fourth Anglo-Dutch War. After capturing Negapatam, the major Dutch outpost in India, a British force assaulted the Dutch-controlled port of Trincomalee on the eastern coast of Ceylon, and successfully stormed Fort Fredrick and Fort Ostenburg to gain control of the city and the port. In gaining control of the port, they also captured the vessels there at the time.

== Background ==
Following French entry into the American War of Independence in 1778, Great Britain moved rapidly to gain control over French colonial outposts in India. In December 1780 Britain also declared war on the Dutch Republic, citing as one of the reasons Dutch trafficking in arms in support of the French and American rebels. Early in 1781 this news reached Iman Willem Falck, the Dutch East India Company's governor of Trincomalee. That summer Lord Macartney arrived to take over as governor of Madras, brought news to the British outpost of the new war, and mobilised British troops to gain control over Dutch possessions in India and Ceylon. These troops first besieged the principal Dutch-controlled port of Negapatam, capturing it on 11 November 1781.

== Action ==
Following their success at Negapatam, British admiral Edward Hughes embarked 500 volunteer sepoys, 30 artillerymen, and additional European volunteers, sailing for Trincomalee on 2 January 1782. Two days later he anchored in Trincomalee Bay. The troops, including about 800 seamen and marines, were landed about 3 miles (4.8 km) north of Fort Fredrick on 5 January and pressed on to the fort. That night, a company of marines gained entry to the fort and surprised the 43-man garrison, taking them prisoner without incident This opened the way for operations against Fort Ostenburg, which commanded the harbour.

On 8 January the marines captured a hill overlooking Fort Ostenburg, and Admiral Hughes summoned Governor Falck to surrender. Due to the difficulty in moving artillery onto this hill, Hughes sent his chief engineer, Major Geils, to deliver the summons. Since he was not blindfolded, Geils was able to ascertain that the place might be carried by storm. He was sent with a second summons two days later, which Governor Falck also rejected. Hughes accordingly ordered the assault to take place the next morning.

The principal storming party consisted of 450 marines and seamen, accompanied by some of the volunteers and seamen carrying scaling ladders. A party of marines were able to penetrate the fort's embrasures and thus gained entry early on 11 January. After a brief battle the garrison surrendered.

== Aftermath ==
Hughes garrisoned the two forts with companies of sepoys and a few artillerymen, embarked the troops and sailed for Madras. Upon his arrival there on 8 February, he learned that a French fleet had arrived in the area. This fleet, led by the Bailli de Suffren, went on to dispute British control over the seas off the Indian coast. In August 1782 Suffren took advantage of Hughes's absence from Trincomalee to recapture it. Hughes and Suffren fought one of their celebrated battles shortly after, on 3 September.

Governor Falck was allowed to travel to Batavia in the Dutch East Indies to report the Dutch loss to his superiors. The Dutch regained control of Ceylon and most other British-captured outposts (notably excepting Negapatam) with the 1784 Treaty of Paris, in exchange for promises to not interfere with British commercial shipping in the Indian Ocean.
