= HMS Monmouth (1772) =

Ship of the line of the Royal Navy

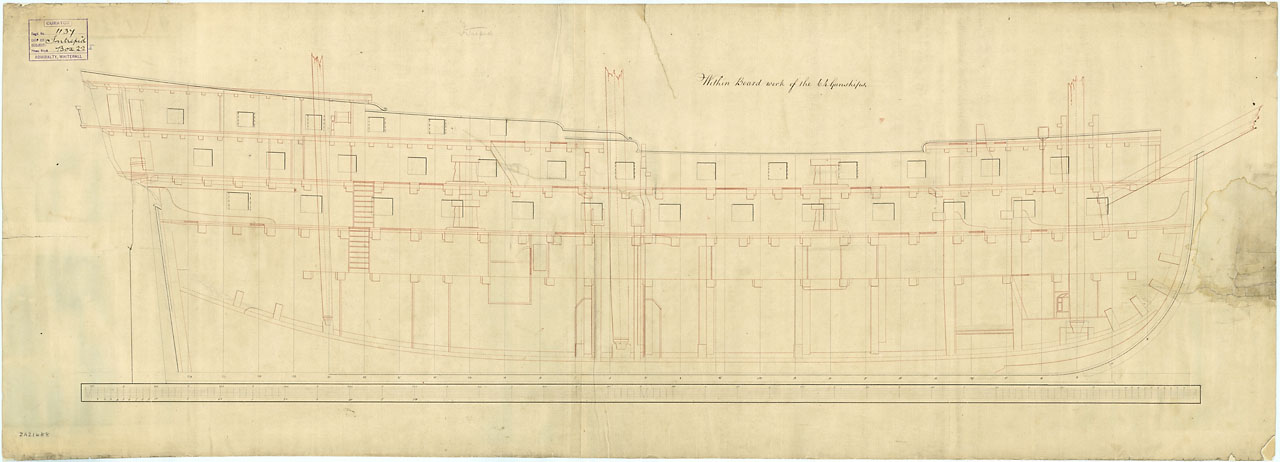
- Ship plan for the Monmouth

History

Great Britain
- Name: HMS Monmouth
- Ordered: 10 September 1767
- Builder: Plymouth Dockyard
- Laid down: May 1768
- Launched: 18 April 1772
- Renamed: Captivity in 1796
- Reclassified: Prison ship from 1796
- Fate: Broken up in January 1818

General characteristics
- Class & type: Intrepid-class ship of the line
- Tons burthen: 1,369 51/94 (bm)
- Length: 159 ft 6 in (48.6 m) (gundeck); 131 ft (39.9 m) (keel)
- Beam: 44 ft 4 in (13.5 m)
- Depth of hold: 19 ft (5.8 m)
- Propulsion: Sails
- Sail plan: Full-rigged ship
- Armament: Gundeck: 26 × 24-pounder guns; Upper gundeck: 26 × 18-pounder guns; QD: 10 × 4-pounder guns; Fc: 2 × 9-pounder guns

HMS Monmouth was an Intrepid-class 64-gun third rate ship of the line of the Royal Navy, built by Israel Pownoll and launched on 18 April 1772 at Plymouth. Being relatively compact in relation to her gun power, she was affectionately known as the "Little Black Ship".

She was not immediately commissioned for service, but went on to serve during the American War of Independence in a number of theatres. May, 1778 under command of Capt. Thomas Collingwood. She was initially in the Caribbean, where she fought at the Battle of Grenada, before returning to Britain to join a special expedition under Commodore George Johnstone, to capture the Dutch colony at the Cape of Good Hope. The expedition was surprised by a French fleet at the Battle of Porto Praya and though Johnstone was able to go on and capture several Dutch merchants in the Battle of Saldanha Bay, he did not attempt to attack the Cape. Monmouth, under her Captain James Alms, was sent on with several other warships to reinforce the East Indies station, and she went on to fight in a number of actions under Sir Edward Hughes against French fleets under the Bailli de Suffren. She returned to Britain on the conclusion of the wars and saw no further active service. Renamed Captivity and used as a prison ship from 1796, she served out the French Revolutionary and Napoleonic Wars, and was broken up in 1818.

== Construction and commissioning ==
Monmouth was ordered on 10 September 1767, one of the first batch of four ships of the Intrepid class, built to a design drawn up by Sir John Williams in 1765. The order was approved on 22 October 1767, and the name Monmouth assigned in November that year. She was laid down at Plymouth Dockyard in May 1768, under the supervision of Master Shipwright Israel Pownoll and launched from there on 18 April 1772. She was completed at the dockyard between October 1777 and 9 May 1778, after the outbreak of the American War of Independence. Expenditure on the ship by this stage came to £30,586.17.3d, with a further £7,426.15.1d. spent fitting her out.

== American waters ==
Her first commander, Captain Thomas Collingwood, commissioned her for service in January 1778, and after fitting out she sailed for the Leeward Islands in June 1778 with the squadron under Vice-Admiral John Byron. She came under the command of Captain Robert Fanshawe in 1779, and under him saw action at the Battle of Grenada on 6 July 1779. Monmouth was heavily involved in the fighting with the comte d'Estaing's fleet, and was ordered to Antigua to carry out repairs. She returned to Britain at the end of the year and was refitted and coppered at Portsmouth between December 1779 and December 1780. She recommissioned in late 1780 under the command of Captain James Alms, and was immediately assigned to the squadron under Commodore George Johnstone.

=== Expedition to South Africa and India ===
Johnstone's squadron was dispatched on a secret expedition to capture the Dutch colony at the Cape of Good Hope. Johnstone sailed on his expedition from Spithead on 13 March 1781 in command of 46 ships and 3,000 troops under General Sir William Medows. The French had learned of the expedition's intent through the services of the spy François Henri de la Motte, based in London, and quickly prepared an expedition under Admiral Pierre André de Suffren to foil Johnstone by beating him to the Cape and reinforcing it. Johnstone at first made for the Cape Verde Islands, anchoring at Porto Praya to take on fresh water.

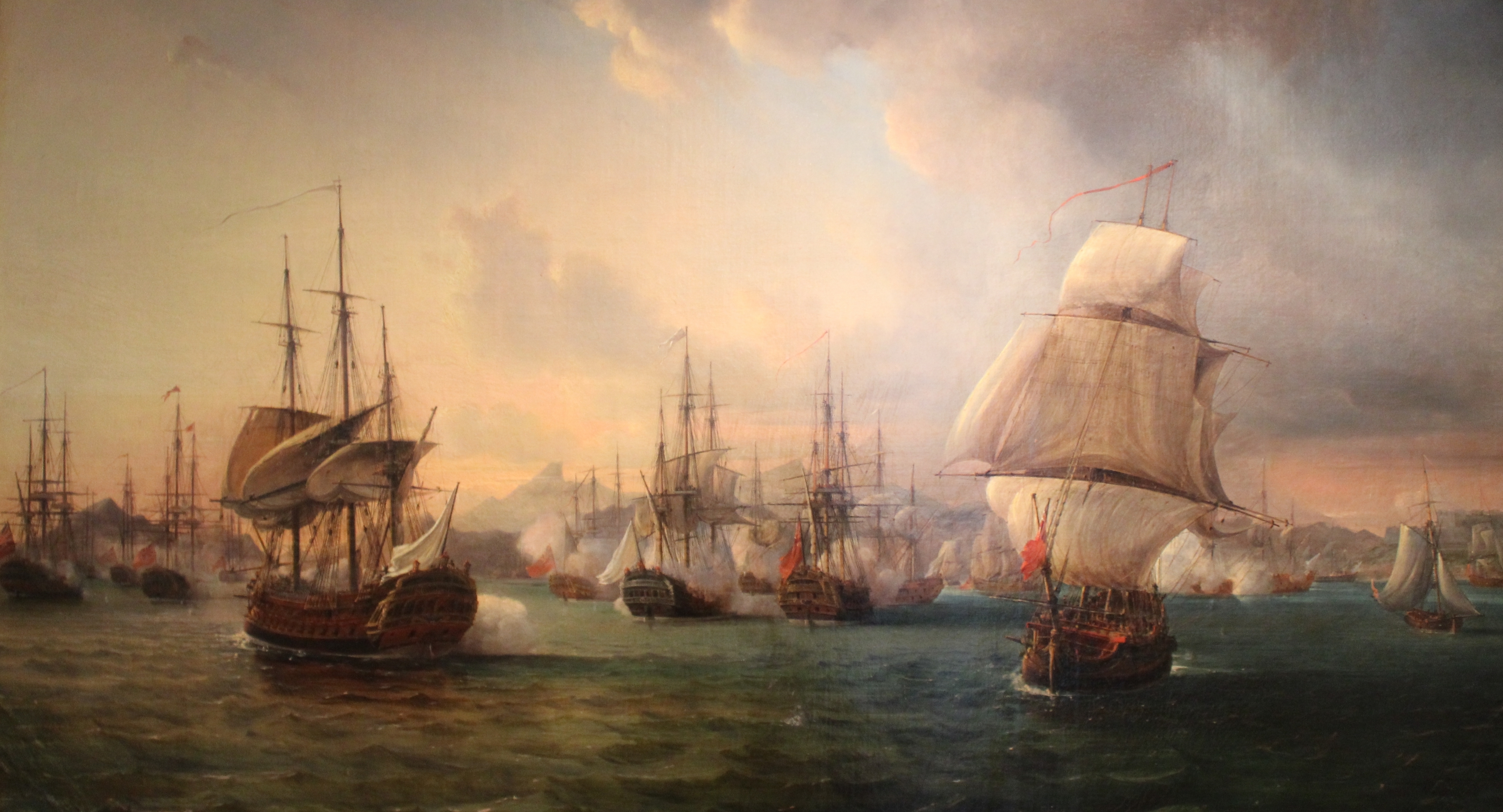
Painting of the Battle of Porto Praya by Pierre-Julien Gilbert

He was surprised at anchor on 16 April by the unexpected arrival of Suffren's squadron, which had also not anticipated finding an enemy force at Porto Praya. The French launched an immediate attack, and it was sometime before the British could respond effectively, eventually driving the French off. Johnstone ordered a pursuit, but his damaged ships were unable to catch up with the French. Suffren sailed directly to the Cape, with Johnstone following after completing repairs. Finding the Dutch forewarned and reinforced on his arrival there, Johnstone did not attempt an attack, instead contenting himself with capturing several Dutch merchants in Saldanha Bay. Johnstone decided to return to Britain with his prizes, detaching the troops and supplies he was escorting for the East Indies station, and sending his best warships under Captain Alms of Monmouth to escort them.

== East Indies service ==
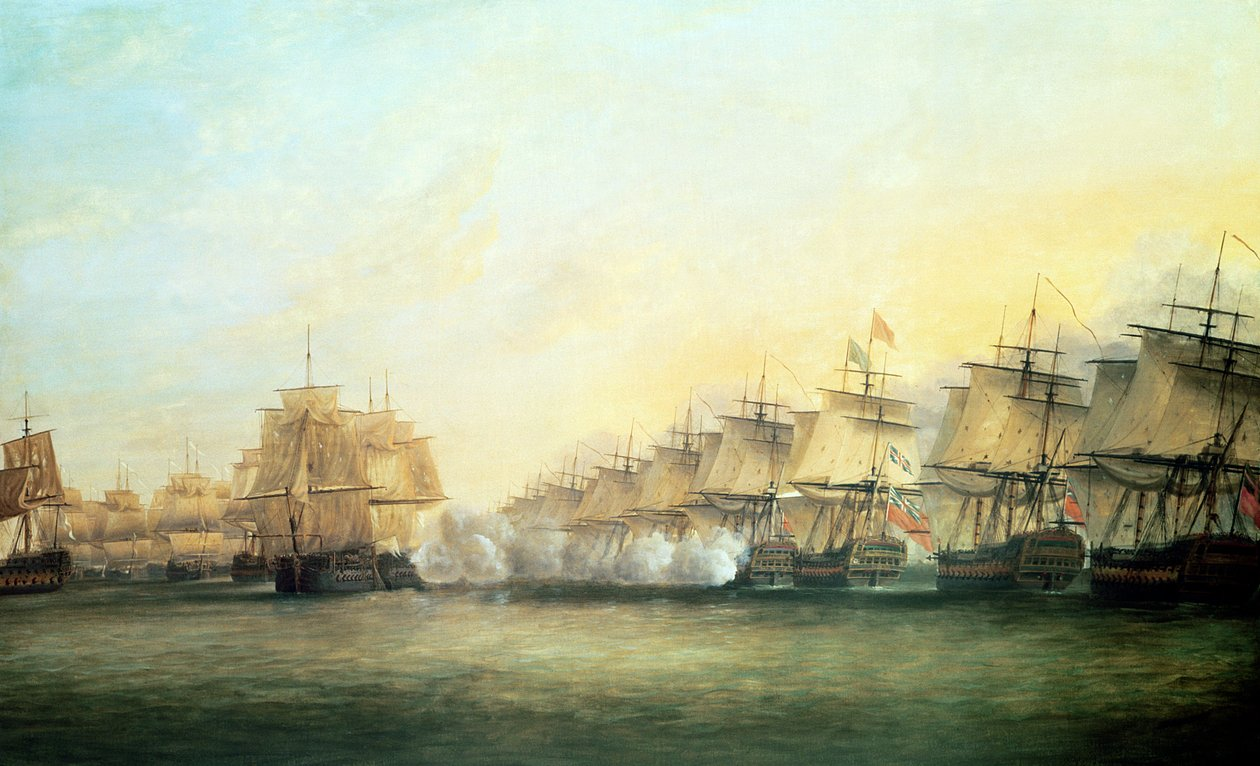
Depiction of the Battle of Trincomalee on the day of 3 September 1782 by Dominic Serres

Alms struggled with adverse winds and high incidences of sickness, eventually forcing him to leave the troopships on the coast of Arabia to bring his warships to reach India in time for the campaigning season. The British fleet rendezvoused with Sir Edward Hughes at Madras on 11 February 1782, and Monmouth went on to be involved in a number of indecisive clashes between Hughes and the Bailli de Suffren; at Sadras on 17 February, Providien on 12 April, Negapatam on 6 July, and Trincomalee on 3 September 1782.

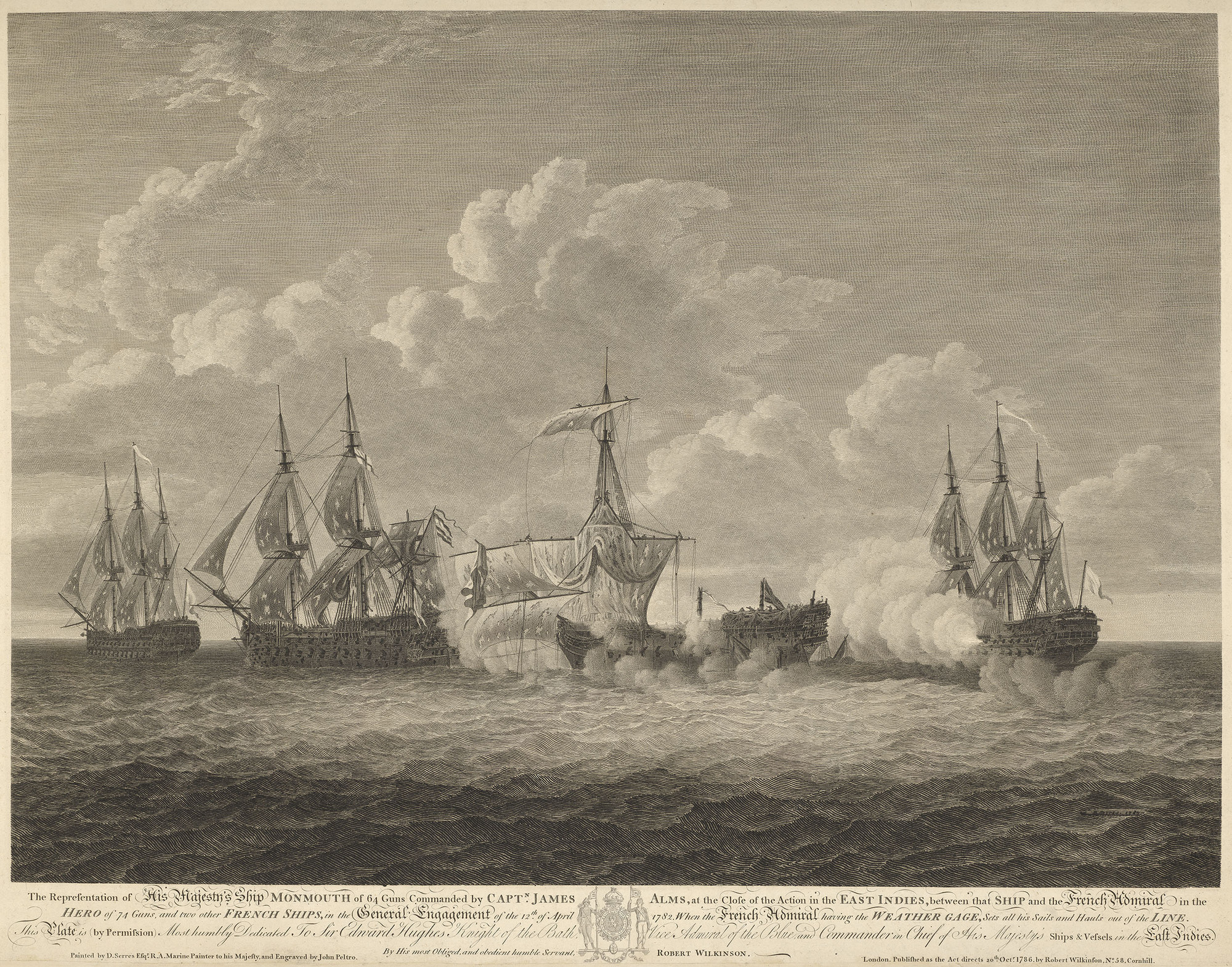
Monmouth was dismasted at the Battle of Providien, 1782

Monmouth had a particularly important part in the Battle of Providien, when she was the second ship in the line to Sir Edward's flagship. At one point in the action, Alms saw that Suffren had put up his helm with a view of boarding Hughes's ship, and brought Monmouth about to defend his commander, the ship receiving heavy fire as he did so. In this engagement, the Monmouth had seven guns dismounted,—the wheel twice cleared,—and two seamen only, besides the captain, left alive on the quarterdeck. Forty-five men were killed, and one hundred and two wounded. Alms himself received two splinter wounds in the face, and two musket balls went through his hat.

== Prison ship and sale ==
Alms brought Monmouth back to Britain at the conclusion of the American War of Independence, and she was paid off in July 1784. She spent a number of years laid up, and was not returned to service on the outbreak of the French Revolutionary Wars. Instead she was renamed Captivity on 20 October 1796, while laid up at Portsmouth, and was fitted out as a prison ship. She continued in this role for over a decade, serving under a number of commanders, Lieutenant Samuel Blow from December 1796, until his replacement in 1800 by Lieutenant Emanuel Hungerford. She was thereafter commanded by Lieutenant Jacob Silver from September 1801, and then a Lieutenant McDonald from December 1805 until sometime in 1806. She was finally broken up at Portsmouth in January 1818.
