= French ship Hardi (1750) =

Ship of the line of the French Navy

History

France
- Name: Hardi
- Builder: Rochefort
- Laid down: 1748
- Launched: 1750
- In service: April 1751
- Out of service: 1798
- Fate: Hulked 1786

General characteristics
- Class & type: Hardi class ship of the line
- Displacement: 2100 tonneaux
- Tons burthen: 1100 port tonneaux
- Length: 48.4 metres
- Beam: 13.2 metres
- Draught: 6.6 metres
- Propulsion: Sails
- Sail plan: Full-rigged ship
- Armament: 64 guns

Hardi was a 64-gun ship of the line of the French Navy.

== Career ==
Built from 1748, Hardi was activated during the Seven Years' War, departing Rochefort in March 1757 with Jacinthe, bound for Martinique where she arrived on 13 May 1757. Incorporated into Admiral du Chaffault's squadron, she took part in the Siege of Louisbourg and in the action of 27 October 1758 off Ushant.

In 1778, Hardi was reactivated for the American Revolutionary War; she departed Toulon on 16 July, under Le Roy de La Grange, to rejoin the squadron under Louis de Fabry. On 20 June 1780, she departed Toulon to join with the squadron under Rear-Admiral de Beausset and take part in the Great Siege of Gibraltar. The next year, on 24 April 1781, she departed Brest with the squadron under La Motte-Picquet and took part in the action of 2 May 1782, in which the French captured 18 British merchantmen bound for St. Eustatius, worth around 5 million pounds.

In early 1782, Hardi transferred to the Indian Ocean to reinforce Suffren's squadron in the Indian Ocean. There, she took part in the Cuddalore on 20 June 1783.

From 1786, Hardi was hulked in Toulon and used as a prison ship.
