= French ship Ajax (1779) =

French naval vessel

History

France
- Name: Ajax
- Namesake: Ajax
- Builder: Lorient
- Laid down: December 1772
- Launched: 14 January 1774
- Out of service: 1786
- Fate: Broken up 1801

General characteristics
- Class & type: Sévère class ship of the line
- Displacement: 2,250 tonneaux
- Tons burthen: 1,300 port tonneaux
- Length: 51.2 metres
- Beam: 13.2 metres
- Draught: 6.7 metres
- Propulsion: Sails
- Sail plan: Full-rigged ship
- Armament: 64 guns

Ajax was a 64-gun ship of the line of the French Navy.

== Career ==
Built as Maréchal de Broglie for private owners and transferred to the French East India Company, the ship sailed two journeys to China as a merchantman. In April 1779, she was purchased by the Crown to ferry furnitures to Isle de France (now Mauritius) and be commissioned as a warship upon her arrival. In June, she was coppered, and she received her name of Ajax on 13 August.

On 16 February 1780, under Captain Bouvet de Précourt, Ajax departed Lorient with Protée, Éléphant and Charmante, escorting a convoy bound for India. In late February, off Spain, the convoy met Rodney's fleet; Protée sacrificed herself to hold the British back and was captured on 24, while Charmante returned to Lorient, arriving on 3 March, and the convoy escaped under the protection of Ajax.

Arrived at Isle the France, Ajax joined Suffren's squadron. At the Battle of Sadras, on 17 February 1782, Suffren ordered Ajax and Flamand, under Cuverville, to attack the British line to leeward. They both maneuvered to this effect, but then Tromelin, on Annibal, countermanded the order by signaling Ajax and Flamand to return to their post in the line of battle. While Ajax obeyed the order, Flamand sailed on and Saint-Félix, of Brillant, requested permission to replace Ajax. After the battle, Suffren apologised to Bouvet for the confusion in his orders that had frustrated him from a prime role in the battle, promising to make up for it at the next occasion.

She took part in the Battle of Negapatam on 6 July 1782, still under Captain Bouvet. The rigging of Ajax having been damaged by a gale the night before and not been repaired, Bouvet requested authorisation to retreat to effect his repairs; when Suffren refused, Ajax remained with her squadron but without taking part in the action. Suffren was furious.

In July 1782, in the wake of the Battle of Negapatam, Suffren appointed Lieutenant de Beaumont le Maître to replace Bouvet.

In the night of 12 January 1783, chasing the frigate Fine which she had mistaken for a privateer, HMS Coventry (1757) sailed into Ganjam Roads, where Suffren's Héros, Illustre, Ajax and Brillant were at anchor. Captain Wolseley, of Coventry, had no information that French vessels were in the area and so allowed the current to take him towards the vessels, the wind being weak. As Coventry arrived, Suffren, on Héros, was sending a boat over to Illustre, but the boat master was drunk and instead mistakenly came aboard Coventry. The boat's crew was promptly taken prisoners and taken to the orlop deck. At this moment, the French division noticed Coventry, and Illustre, Ajax and Brillant opened fire. Interrogating his prisoners, Wolseley learnt that the ships firing on him were part of Suffren's squadron, at which point his men rushed below. Alone on his quarterdeck, Wolseley had no choice but to surrender.

Ajax then took part in the Battle of Trincomalee under Beaumont le Maître, and in the Battle of Cuddalore under Captain Dupas de la Mancelière, who was killed in the action.

She was struck in 1786 but was reinstated as a floating battery at Verdon in June 1795. The ship was broken up sometime after March 1801.
