= James Alms =

Royal Navy officer (1728 – 1791)

Captain James Alms
- Born: 15 July 1728; Alverstoke, Hampshire (now Gosport)
- Died: 8 June 1791 (aged 62); Chichester
- Burial place: Chichester Cathedral
- Military career
- Allegiance: Great Britain
- Branch: Royal Navy
- Service years: 1740–1791
- Rank: Captain
- Commands: HMS Flamborough's Prize; HMS Alarm; HMS Ferret; HMS Cygnet; HMS Montreal; HMS Monmouth
- Conflicts: War of the Austrian Succession; Battle of Toulon; First Battle of Cape Finisterre; Carnatic Wars; Capture of Gheria; Seven Years' War; Battle of Quiberon Bay; Capture of Martinique; Battle of Havana; American Revolutionary War; Battle of Porto Praya; Battle of Sadras; Battle of Providien; Battle of Negapatam; Battle of Trincomalee

Captain James Alms (15 July 1728 – 8 June 1791) was an officer of the Royal Navy who served during the War of the Austrian Succession, the Carnatic and Seven Years' War and the American War of Independence. Alms rose to the rank of post-captain in the Royal Navy.

Alms served in the Navy from an early age, seeing his first action in the Mediterranean Sea and off the French coast before getting assigned to the East Indies. He narrowly survived a shipwreck that killed most of his shipmates. He was awarded the rank of lieutenant. After a return to England, he sailed back in the East Indies for service during the early years of the Seven Years' War. Following this, Alms was stationed in the West Indies in acting-command of a frigate. After being involved in a number of important actions in the Caribbean, he returned to Britain after the end of the war, and retired ashore. Alms returned to active service after the outbreak of the American War of Independence. He again went back to the East Indies in command of his own ship. He was in action at most of the engagements between Sir Edward Hughes and the Bailli de Suffren, when he particularly distinguishing himself at the Battle of Providien. Alms retired ashore after the end of the war, and died in 1791.

== Family and early life ==
Alms was born in Gosport, Hampshire on 15 July 1728, to John and Mary Alms. His father was said to be a servant of the Duke of Richmond. After a period working in merchant ships, he entered the navy in 1740, joining the 74-gun HMS Namur, and by the age of 14 was rated midshipman and serving as aide de camp to Captain Charles Watson, of the 60-gun HMS Dragon in the Mediterranean. He saw action at the Battle of Toulon on 22 February 1744 and was praised by his commander for his actions in the engagement. He then joined the 74-gun HMS Namur, serving with Admiral George Anson's fleet off the French coast. Anson's fleet engaged the French at the First Battle of Cape Finisterre on 14 May 1747, winning a decisive victory and capturing a number of French warships and merchants. Alms remained in Namur, and went out in her in October the following year to the East Indies with Admiral Edward Boscawen. Namur was one of three ships wrecked on the Coromandel coast in a storm on 12 April 1749, with Alms being one of just 23 who survived. He was promoted to lieutenant on 14 May 1749 in the aftermath of the disaster and was assigned to HMS Siren, a frigate returning to England in the spring of 1752.

== East and West Indies ==
Alms took up the command of the former East Indiaman Hardwick, where he worked trading between Bombay and China. The Hardwick was requisitioned by the government to carry stores in the Carnatic Wars, and was present with his old commander, now Rear-Admiral Sir Charles Watson, at the capture of Gheria on 12–13 February 1756. In 1758, after the outbreak of the Seven Years' War, Alms returned overland to England and offered his services. He was appointed lieutenant of the 74-gun HMS Mars under Captain James Young, and was present at the Battle of Quiberon Bay on 20 November 1759. Alms continued in Mars for a further two years, and was promoted to master and commander in June 1761. He was made commander of HMS Flamborough's Prize on 10 July 1761, and in November became acting captain of the 32-gun HMS Alarm, which he sailed to the West Indies with Admiral Sir George Pocock's fleet in February 1762, arriving in time to take part in the capture of Martinique.

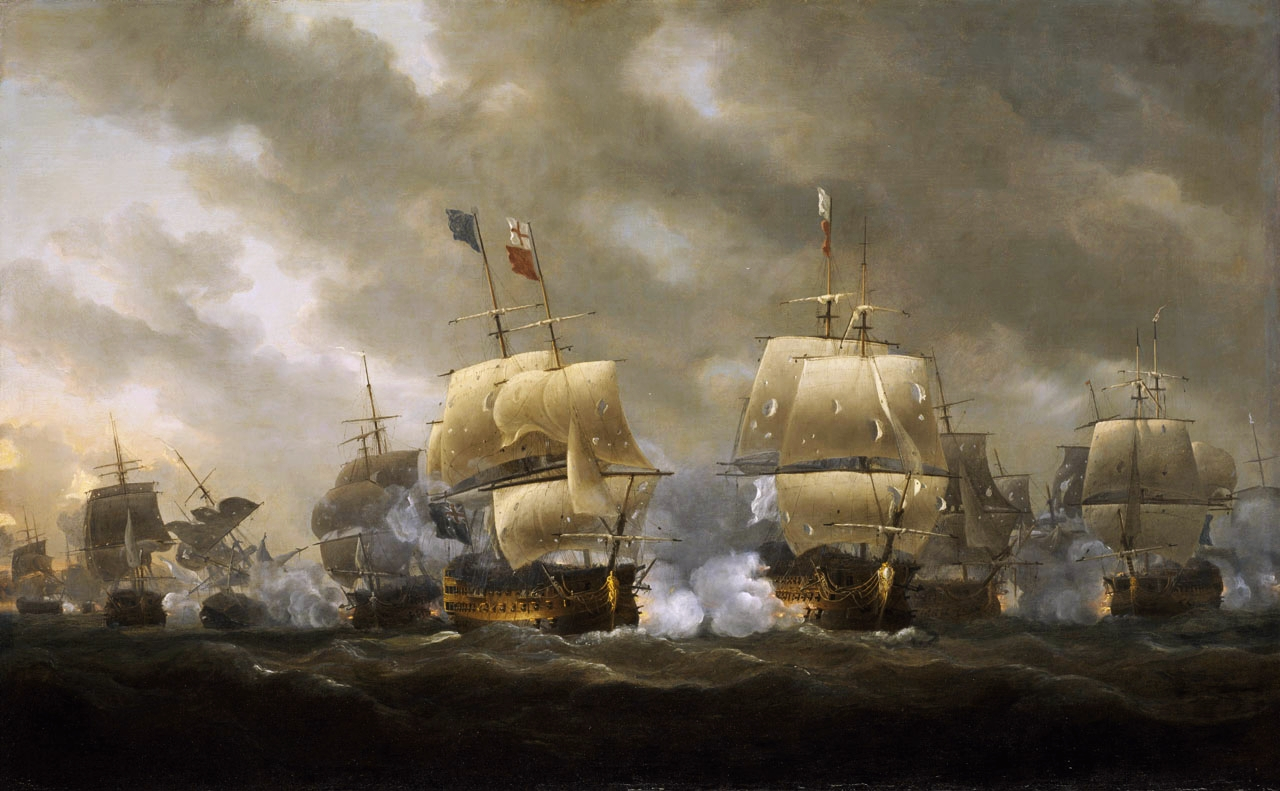
The Battle of Quiberon Bay, Nicholas Pocock, 1812

While cruising in Caribbean waters, he captured two armed sloops, one of 18 guns and one of 12 guns. He had further success on 3 June, when, while sailing to Havana with the rest of the fleet, he came upon and captured two Spanish vessels, one of 22 guns, and one of 18 guns. The two ships put up a fierce resistance, and in the ensuing engagement several musket balls passed through Alms' hat, and he was wounded in the knee. On arriving at Havana he handed Alarm over to the captain appointed to her, and took up a post as commander of the sloop HMS Ferret, moving to command HMS Cygnet in November that year.

He was subsequently heavily involved in the operations to capture Havana, and was on several occasions entrusted with important tasks. Admiral Augustus Keppel said of him that he was an 'alert, forceful man', and he was given the task of carrying the dispatches home, with Keppel's recommendation that he be promoted. However he was not promoted to post-captain until 20 June 1765, after the end of the Seven Years' War.

== Command ==
Alms spent a number of years ashore after this, living with his family at Chichester. Through the interest of George Montagu-Dunk, 2nd Earl of Halifax, he was given command of HMS Montreal in the Mediterranean in 1770, commanding her for three years. He became captain regulating the impress service for the Sussex district in 1776, but severe asthma prevented him accepting any more active service until September 1780, when he was appointed to command the 64-gun HMS Monmouth. He went out to the East Indies again with a squadron under Commodore George Johnstone, becoming involved on the way in the Battle of Porto Praya on 16 April 1781 against the Bailli de Suffren. After arriving at the Cape of Good Hope, Johnstone put Alms in command of the reinforcements and East India ships bound for India. Alms struggled with adverse winds and a high incidence of sickness, eventually forcing him to leave the troopships on the coast of Arabia in order to bring his warships to India in time for the campaigning season.

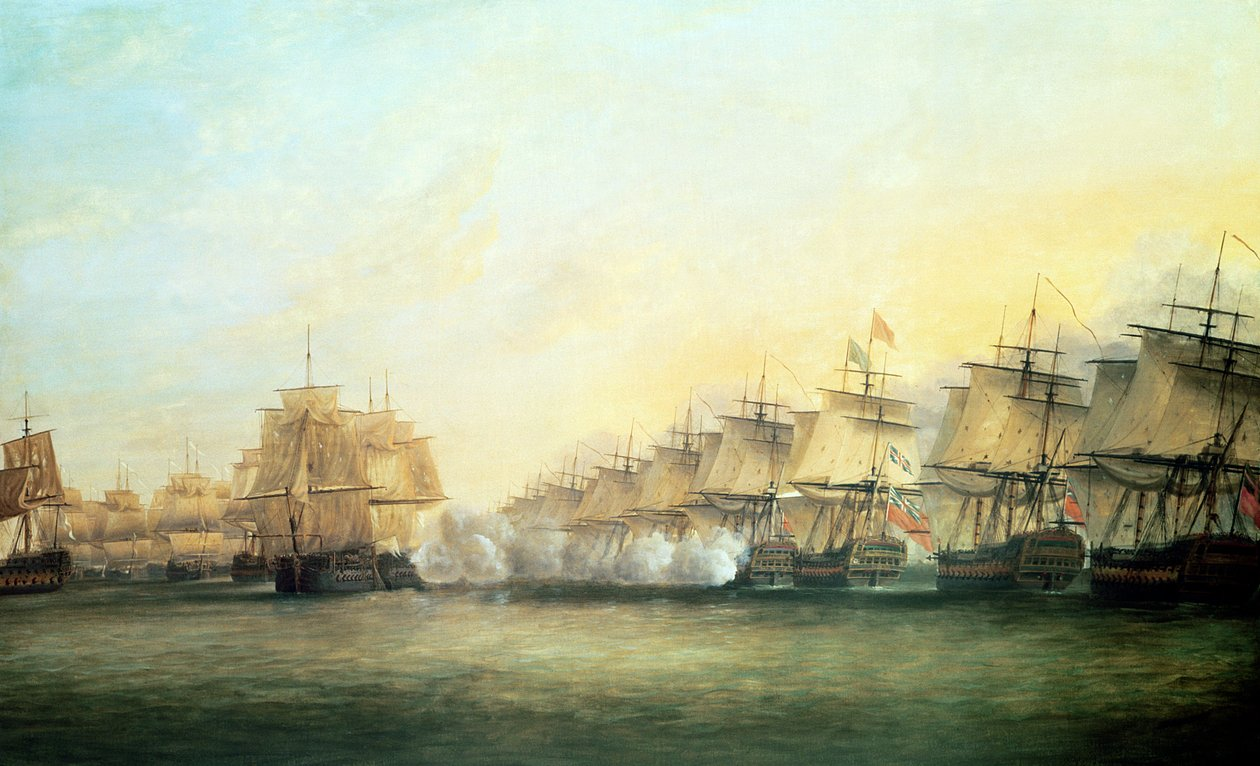
Depiction of the Battle of Trincomalee by Dominic Serres

The British fleet rendezvoused with Sir Edward Hughes at Madras on 11 February 1782, and Alms went on to be involved in a number of indecisive clashes between Hughes and the Bailli de Suffren at Sadras on 17 February, Providien on 12 April, Negapatam on 6 July, and Trincomalee on 3 September 1782. It was at Providien on 12 April 1782 that he particularly distinguished himself.

=== Battle of Providien ===
On the day of the battle, 12 April 1782, Monmouth was second in line to Sir Edward's flagship. At one point in the action, Alms saw that Suffren had put up his helm with a view of boarding Hughes's ship, and luffed his ship into the "very eye of the wind," threw into the Frenchman's bows a raking broadside, and frustrated the enemy's plan. Subsequently to this manoeuvre, the Monmouth sustained heavy fire from Suffren and his two seconds, which continued until the main and mizzen-masts of the former fell over the side. The British colours had already been twice shot away, but they were now nailed to the stump of the mizzen-mast, with Alms's direction, "never to be struck."

In this engagement, the Monmouth had seven guns dismounted—the wheel twice cleared—and two seamen only, besides the captain, left alive on the quarterdeck. 45 men were killed and 102 wounded. Alms himself received two splinter-wounds in the face, and two musketballs went through his hat. His eldest son, George Pigot, who was serving as lieutenant of the Superb, the flagship of Sir Edward Hughes, died early in the action.

== Death ==
Alms's health declined during the winter, and he was forced to go ashore at Madras for several months. This marked the end of his active service, and he returned to England, arriving at Spithead in June 1784. Alms retired to his house at Chichester and died there on 8 June 1791 at the age of 64, survived by his wife and five children. His eldest son on his death was a lieutenant aboard HMS St George, serving Rear-Admiral Sir Richard King, one of Alms's friends from his days in India. Alms was buried at Chichester Cathedral on 14 June 1791.
