= Spanish ship Monarca (1756) =

- Plan of Monarca as captured

History

Spain
- Name: Monarca
- Ordered: 27 March 1754
- Builder: Naval dockyard, Ferrol
- Laid down: 1 April 1754
- Launched: 13 June 1756
- Captured: 16 January 1780, by Royal Navy
- Notes: Participated in: Battle of Cape St Vincent

Great Britain
- Name: HMS Monarca
- Acquired: 16 January 1780
- Fate: Sold, 1791
- Notes: Participated in: Battle of Cuddalore

General characteristics
- Class & type: 68-gun third-rate ship of the line
- Tons burthen: 1911 bm
- Length: 174 ft 4 1/2 in (53.150 m) (gundeck)
- Beam: 40 ft 10 in (12.45 m)
- Depth of hold: 20 ft 7 in (6.27 m)
- Sail plan: Full-rigged ship
- Armament: 68 guns of various weights of shot

Monarca was a 68-gun ship of the line of the Spanish Navy, ordered in 1754 to a design by expatriate British ship designer Richard Rooth and launched in 1756. She belonged to the four-ship Triunfante class.

She fought at the Battle of Cape St Vincent in 1780, in which she was captured by the Royal Navy and subsequently commissioned as the third rate HMS Monarca. She came under the command of Captain John Gell who was under the orders of Sir Samuel Hood to go to the West Indies. However, she was dismasted in a storm and obliged to return to Britain for refitting.

She fought at the Battle of Cuddalore in 1783 and was sold out of the navy in 1791.
