= French frigate Consolante (1775) =

French Navy frigate (1772–1784)

History

France
- Name: Consolante
- Namesake: "Consoling"
- Ordered: 6 February 1772
- Builder: Lorient
- Laid down: April 1772
- Launched: 26 June 1775
- In service: 1776
- Out of service: 1784
- Fate: Broken up 1804

General characteristics
- Class & type: Pourvoyeuse-class frigate
- Displacement: 1928 tonneaux
- Tons burthen: 840 port tonneaux
- Length: 50 m (164 ft 1 in)
- Beam: 12.3 m (40 ft 4 in)
- Draught: 6.3 m (20 ft 8 in)
- Armament: Main deck: 26 × 18-pounder guns; Forecastle: 12 × 8-pounder guns

Consolante was a 40-gun frigate of the French Navy, second ship of her class. She is notable as one of the earliest attempts at building a frigate armed with 24-pounders on the artillery deck, rather than the 18-pounders typical of the day.

== Career ==
Although Consolante was designed to carry 24-pounders on her battery, on 2 February 1776 Lorient was ordered to arm her with 18-pounder long guns.

On 4 April 1777, Captain Boudin de Tromelin took command.

In 1778, she was sent to India under Captain La Motte-Vauvert, and was part of the defences of Isle de France (Mauritius).

On 31 May 1782, Bussy-Castelnau arrived at Isle de France with the 74-gun Illustre and the 64-gun Saint Michel. Informed that Thomas d'Estienne d'Orves had left the island on 7 December 1781 with his squadron to attack Trincomalee, Bussy decided to attach Consolante to his squadron, as well as 800 men from the garrison which he embarked on 9 transports, and go reinforce him.

From 1781, she was part of the squadron under Suffren. She took part in the Battle of Trincomalee, where her commanding officer, Lieutenant de Péan, was killed.

At the Battle of Cuddalore on 20 June 1783, he was under Pierre Alexandre Pastour de Costebelle.

== Fate ==
Consolante was hulked in 1784 in Brest, and broken up in 1804.
