= Prosper Levot =

French naval historian

Prosper Jean Levot (14 December 1801 – 3 February 1878) was a French librarian and historian, author of several books on the history of Brest, Brittany and the French Navy.

== Sources ==
=== Bibliography ===
- Levot, Prosper (1866). Les gloires maritimes de la France: notices biographiques sur les plus célèbres marins (in French). Bertrand. p. 182.
