= French ship Saint Michel (1741) =

64-gun ship of the line of the French Navy

History

France
- Name: Saint Michel
- Builder: Jean-Marie Helie, Brest
- Laid down: November 1738
- Launched: January 1741
- In service: May 1741
- Out of service: May 1786
- Fate: Hulked 1788

General characteristics
- Class & type: Saint Michel class ship of the line
- Displacement: 2150tonneaux
- Tons burthen: 1242 port tonneaux
- Length: 46.6 metres
- Beam: 12.5 metres
- Draught: 6.3 metres
- Depth of hold: 5.9 metres
- Propulsion: Sails
- Sail plan: Full-rigged ship
- Armament: 64 guns

Saint Michel was a 64-gun ship of the line of the French Navy, lead ship of her class.

== Career ==
Built for the Crown, Saint Michel was originally manned by officers of the French East India Company. During the War of the Austrian Succession, Saint Michel was part of a squadron under Admiral de Rochambeau; on 17 August 1744, she captured the 20-gun HMS Solebay near Gibraltar. In 1747, her command was transferred to Navy officers.

In 1761, she was recommissioned in Rochefort under Captain de Lizardais to serve in the Seven Years' War, to serve in the Caribbean theatre, but she never actually departed. She was then refitted as a 60 gun ship in 1762.

During the American Revolutionary War, Saint Michel took part in the Battle of Ushant on 27 July 1778, under Mithon de Genouilly. She and later took part in the capture of HMS Ardent off Plymouth on 17 August 1779.

She took part in the Battle of Martinique in the Caribbean on 17 April 1780, under Chevalier d'Aymar.

On 11 December 1781, Bussy-Castelnau departed Cádiz with a squadron comprising Saint-Michel and the 74-gun Illustre, escorting three transports, to make his junction at Tenerife with another squadron under Guichen. the next day, they encountered a British squadron under Kempenfelt. In the subsequent Second Battle of Ushant, most of the French transports were captured by the British, except Marquis de Castries and Neptune-Royal, which reached Sainte-Croix carrying siege artillery and an artillery company.

Bussy sailed on towards the Indian Ocean, arriving to Table Bay in early April. He landed his troops to reinforce the Dutch Cape Colony against a possible British attack, and on 2 May he sailed to Isle de France (Mauritius), where Saint-Michel and Illustre arrived on 31, the transports following a few days later. Informed that Thomas d'Estienne d'Orves had left the island on 7 December 1781 with his squadron to attack Trincomalee, Bussy decided to attach the 40-gun frigate Consolante to his squadron, as well as 800 men from the garrison which he embarked on 9 transports, and go reinforce him.

On 21 August 1782, Ilustre and Saint-Michel arrived at Batacalo, making their junction with the squadron under Suffren. They were escorting 8 transports and preceded by the corvette Fortune, under Lusignan.

Appointed to Suffren's squadron in the Indian Ocean, she took part in the battles of Trincomalee. After D'Aymar was promoted to Annibal, Suffren appointed Lieutenant Beaumont le Maître to replace him. Saint Michel took part in the Cuddalore, before she returned to France in 1784.

Saint Michel carried out another mission to the Indian Ocean in 1787 before returning to France to be hulked the next year.
