= French ship Illustre (1781) =

Ship of the line of the French Navy

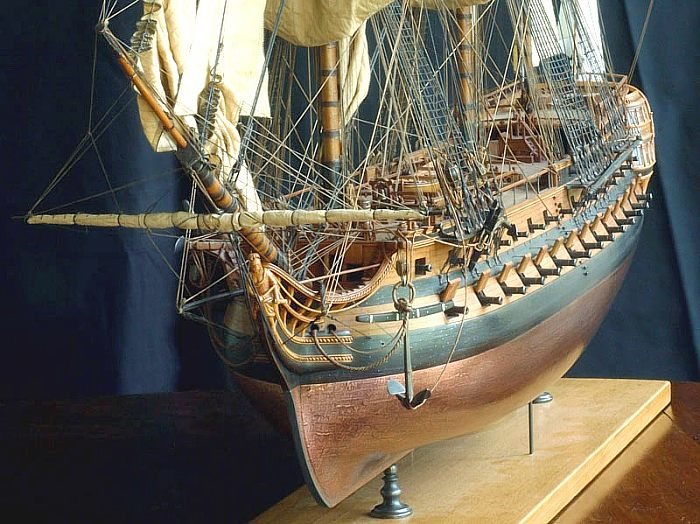
- A 74-gun French ship of the line similar to Illustre

History

France
- Name: Illustre
- Namesake: Illustrious
- Builder: Rochefort
- Laid down: August 1779
- Launched: 23 February 1781
- In service: March 1781
- Out of service: 16 December 1796
- Fate: Scuttled 30 December 1796

General characteristics
- Class & type: Magnanime-class ship of the line
- Displacement: 2,950 tonneaux
- Tons burthen: 1,500 port tonneaux
- Length: 55.6 m (182 ft 5 in)
- Beam: 14.3 m (46 ft 11 in)
- Draught: 6.8 m (22 ft 4 in)
- Propulsion: Sail
- Armament: 74 guns: 28 × 36-pounders; 30 × 18-pounders; 16 × 8-pounders

Illustre was a 74-gun Magnanime-class ship of the line of the French Navy. She took part in the War of American Independence and in the French Revolutionary Wars. Damaged beyond repairs during the Expédition d'Irlande, she was scuttled on 30 December 1796.

== Career ==
=== War of American Independence ===
On 11 December 1781, Bussy-Castelnau departed Cádiz with a squadron comprising the 64-gun Saint Michel and Illustre, under Bruyères-Chalabre, escorting three transports, to make his junction at Tenerife with another squadron under Guichen. the next day, they encountered a British squadron under Kempenfelt. In the subsequent Second Battle of Ushant, most of the French transports were captured by the British, except Marquis de Castries and Neptune-Royal, which reached Sainte-Croix carrying siege artillery and an artillery company.

Bussy sailed on towards the Indian Ocean, arriving to Table Bay in early April. He landed his troops to reinforce the Dutch Cape Colony against a possible British attack, and on 2 May 1782 he sailed to Isle de France (Mauritius), where Saint-Michel and Illustre arrived on 31, the transports following a few days later. Informed that Thomas d'Estienne d'Orves had left the island on 7 December 1781 with his squadron to attack Trincomalee, Bussy decided to attach the 40-gun frigate Consolante to his squadron, as well as 800 men from the garrison which he embarked on 9 transports, and go reinforce him.

On 21 August 1782, Ilustre and Saint-Michel arrived at Batacalo, making their junction with the squadron under Suffren. They were escorting eight transports and preceded by the corvette Fortune, under Lusignan.

In the night of 12 January 1783, chasing the frigate Fine which she had mistaken for a privateer, HMS Coventry sailed into Ganjam Roads, where Suffren's Héros, Illustre, Ajax and Brillant were at anchor. Captain Wolseley, of Coventry, had no information that French vessels were in the area and so allowed the current to take him towards the vessels, the wind being weak. As Coventry arrived, Suffren, on Héros, was sending a boat over to Illustre, but the boat master was drunk and instead mistakenly came aboard Coventry. The boat's crew was promptly taken prisoners and taken to the orlop deck. At this moment, the French division noticed Coventry, and Illustre, Ajax and Brillant opened fire. Interrogating his prisoners, Wolseley learnt that the ships firing on him were part of Suffren's squadron, at which point his men rushed below. Alone on his quarterdeck, Wolseley had no choice but to surrender.

=== Later service ===
In 1788, Illustre was the flagship of a squadron under Nieuil, cruising off Tunis.

Illustre stayed in Brest between 1788 and 1791. She was razeed into a 44-gun frigate in 1793.

In February 1794, she was renamed Mucius Scévola, and Scévola the next month.

She took part in the Expédition d'Irlande. On 30 December 1796, she was wrecked in a storm and was so badly damaged that she was scuttled. The crew was evacuated by Révolution.
