= Charles Cunat =

French naval officer and historian

Charles-Marie Cunat (Saint-Malo, 20 May 1789 – Saint-Malo, 21 February 1862.) was a French naval officer, privateer and naval historian.

== Career ==
Cunat started sailing at the age of 16 on the privateer Napoléon, on which he fought in two battles. In 1808, he enlisted on the privateer Deux-Sœurs; during the campaign, he was appointed to the prize crew sent aboard a captured ship, which turned out to be so badly damaged that she had to make a port call in Tharangambadi for fear of sinking. Cunat was taken prisoner and the British sent him to Puducherry.

Released on parole in 1809, he returned to Mauritius. The year after, he enlisted as a chief gunner on the frigate Minerve, under Captain Bouvet. He took part in all the battles of Minerve, and sustained two injuries at the shoulder and the eye.

After the Invasion of Isle de France in late 1810, he returned to France, and obtained the rank of Ensign in 1811. He was then appointed to a ship of the line in Antwerp. During the Siege of Antwerp in 1814, Bouvet fought ashore, leading a 25-man platoon.

After the Bourbon Restoration, he settled in Mauritius, retired from the Navy, and became the ship-owner of the Latchimie (Note: The name of the ship honoured an Indian girl who had saved Cunat's life by treating him after he was bitten by a cobra) and sailed several journeys in the Indian Ocean. In 1830, he was awarded the Legion of Honour.

Returned to France to support his ailing wife, Cunat continued to sail merchantmen as captain of the Noémi. After his wife's death, he remarried and settled in Saint-Malo in 1835 to raise his children. From 1835 to 1862, he served as an aid to the major of Saint-Malo, and wrote History books in his spare time.

== Works ==
- Cunat, Charles. Histoire de Robert Surcouf (in French).
- Cunat, Charles (1852). Histoire du Bailli de Suffren (in French). Marteville & Lefas.
- Cunat, Charles (1857). Saint-Malo illustré par ses marins (in French). Imprimerie de F. Péalat.
- Cunat, Charles. Saint-Malo sous la Terreur (in French).
- Cunat, Charles (1851). Histoire de la cité d'Aleth (in French).
- Cunat, Charles. Évéché de Saint-Malo, anciennes réformations (in French).

Cunat furthermore contributed the articles on André Désilles, René Duguay-Trouin, Joseph Potier, Robert Surcouf and various others in the Biographie bretonne directed by Prosper Levot:

- Levot, Prosper (1852). Biographie bretonne: recueil de notices sur tous les Bretons qui se sont fait un nom (in French). Vol. 1. Caudran.
- Levot, Prosper (1852). Biographie bretonne: recueil de notices sur tous les Bretons qui se sont fait un nom (in French). Vol. 2. Caudran.

== Sources and references ==
=== Bibliography ===
- Levot, Prosper (1866). Les gloires maritimes de la France: notices biographiques sur les plus célèbres marins (in French). Bertrand.
