= Battle of Providien =

1782 American Revolutionary War naval battle

- Part of the American Revolutionary War
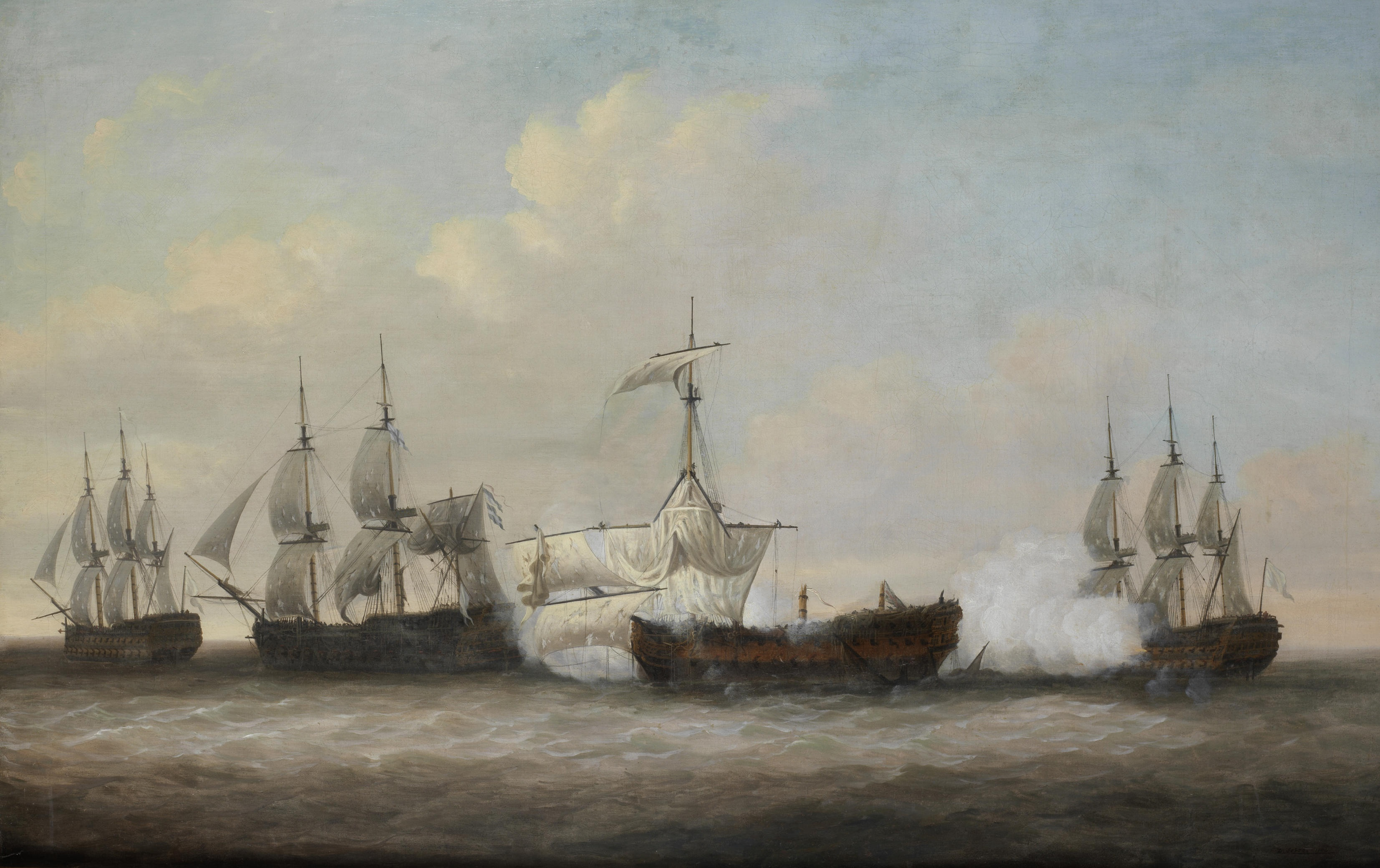
- 1784 painting of the battle
Date	12 April 1782
Location	Off Dutch Ceylon, Bay of Bengal 8°15′17.94″N 81°30′47.02″E
Result	Inconclusive

Belligerents
Great Britain	France

Commanders and leaders
Edward Hughes	Pierre André de Suffren

Strength
11 ships of the line	12 ships of the line

Casualties and losses
137 killed 430 wounded	139 killed 430 wounded

The Battle of Providien was the second in a series of naval battles fought between a British fleet, under Vice-Admiral Sir Edward Hughes, and a French fleet, under the Bailli de Suffren, off the coast of India during the Anglo-French War. The battle was fought on 12 April 1782 off the east coast of Ceylon, near a rocky islet called Providien, south of Trincomalee.

== Background ==
In 1778, France had entered the American Revolutionary War; and in 1780 Britain declared war on the Dutch Republic after the Dutch refused to stop trading military supplies with France and America. The British had rapidly gained control over most French and Dutch outposts in India when news of these events reached India, spawning the Second Anglo-Mysore War in the process.

In March 1781, French Admiral Bailli de Suffren was dispatched on a mission to provide military assistance to French colonies in India, leading a fleet of five ships, seven transports, and a corvette to escort the transports from Brest. After a happenstance battle with the British fleet at Porto Praya in the Cape Verde Islands in April, the French fleet stopped at the Dutch-controlled Cape of Good Hope in October. Troops were left to assist the Dutch in defence of that colony while the fleet was reinforced by additional ships with command transferred to the elderly Admiral Thomas d'Estienne d'Orves. The French fleet sailed on to Île de France (now Mauritius), arriving at Port Louis in December. They then sailed for India with transports that carried nearly 3,000 men under the command of the Comte du Chemin. D'Orves died in February 1782, shortly before the fleet arrived off the Indian coast, and Suffren resumed command.

Suffren first sailed for Madras, hoping to surprise the British stronghold. When he found the fleet of Sir Edward Hughes anchored there on 15 February 1782, he turned south with the intent of landing troops at Porto Novo, hoping to march up the coast and recapture French and Dutch holdings on the way. Hughes raised anchor and sailed after Suffren. In the Battle of Sadras, both fleets suffered damage without loss of ships, but the French were able to safely land troops at Porto Novo to assist the Mysoreans. Suffren made repairs to his fleet at Pondicherry after that battle; on 23 February, he sailed out to find Hughes, who had gone to Trincomalee for repairs.

On 8 April, Hughes's fleet was spotted heading for Trincomalee. Suffren gave chase, but was unable to close for three days. Hughes had to change course on 12 April to continue toward Trincomalee, which gave Suffren the advantage of the wind.

== Battle ==
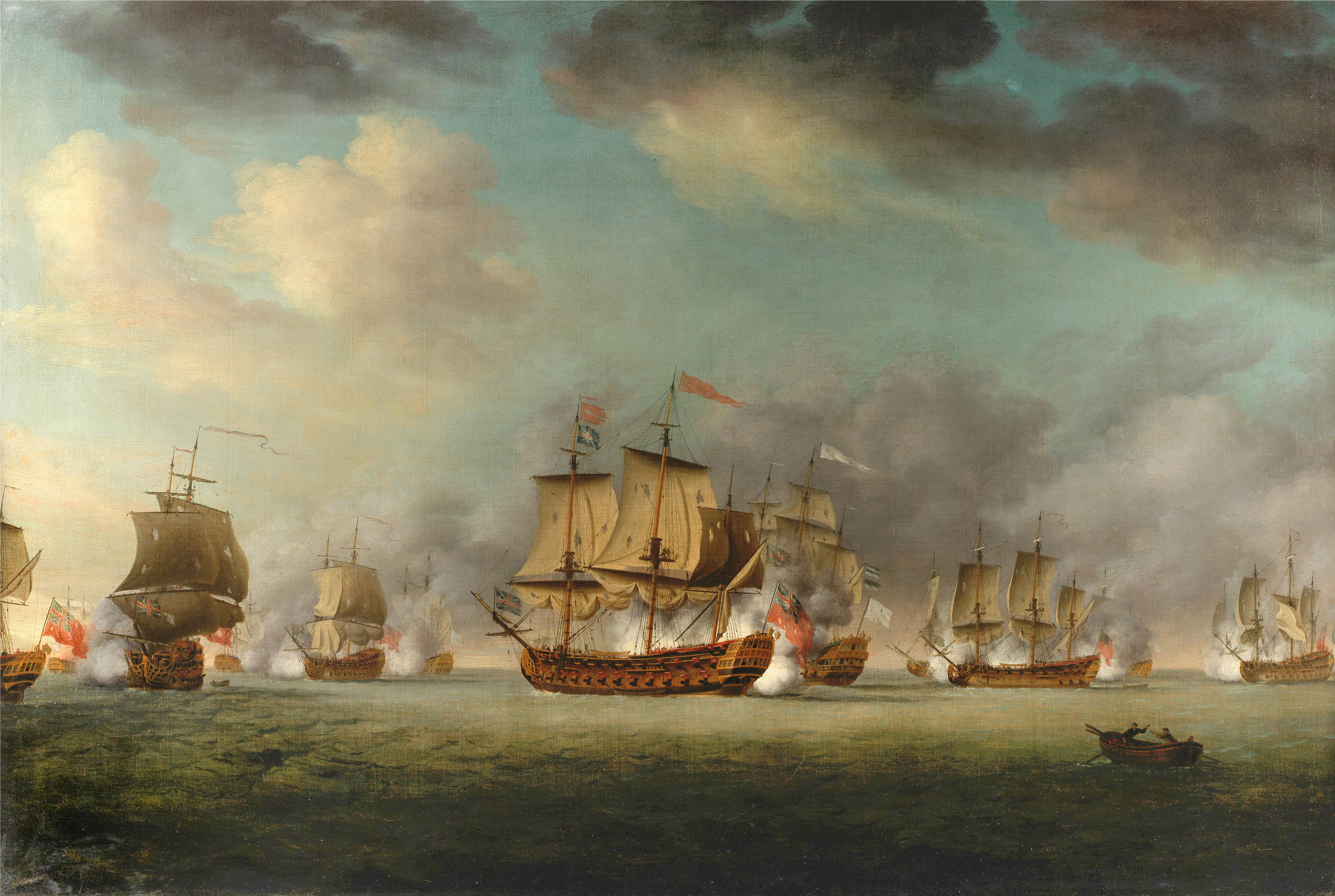
Painting of the battle by Richard Paton

The battle lines engaged at about 12:30 pm. Initially, some of Suffren's captains hesitated, not immediately joining in the line (as had also happened at Sadras), but eventually ten of his twelve ships were engaged against the eleven British ships. HMS Monmouth was the first ship to quit the British line after being dismasted, and HMS Superb also suffered significant damage in the early rounds. Hughes was able to regain advantage by ordering his fleet to wear ship, and the battle began to turn against the French. Around 6:00 pm, a storm arose; the combatants, close to a lee shore, broke off the battle to attend to the risks the storm presented. Darkness from the storm and then nightfall precluded further battle that day.

== Aftermath ==
The fleets had anchored near enough to each other that Suffren again positioned for battle. Hughes, however, had a convoy to protect, and sailed for Trincomalee. Suffren sailed south and anchored at Batticaloa, which was still under Dutch control, where he spent six weeks for repairs and resupply. While there, he received orders to sail to Île de France to escort another troop convoy. Suffren chose to disregard this order, as the risk posed by Hughes to French operations required his full strength, and he could not trust his captains. The captains of Vengeur and Artésien, the two ships that stayed out of the action, were reported for their failure to obey orders, and his second-in-command was intriguing with some of the other captains against him.

== Order of battle ==
French line of battle
Ship	Rate	Guns	Navy	Commander	Casualties			Notes
Ship	Rate	Guns	Navy	Commander	Killed	Wounded	Total	Notes
Vengeur	64-gun	64	Ensign of the French Royal Navy	Captain de Forbin				Took only a minor part in the action.
Artésien	64-gun	64	Ensign of the French Royal Navy	Captain de Bidé de Maurville				Took only a minor part in the action.
Petit Annibal	50-gun	50	Ensign of the French Royal Navy	Captain Morard de Galles				
Sphinx	64-gun	64	Ensign of the French Royal Navy	Captain du Chilleau				
Héros	74-gun	74	Ensign of the French Royal Navy	Captain Pierre André de Suffren; Major de Moissac (flag captain)	11	38	49	Damage to rigging.
Orient	74-gun	74	Ensign of the French Royal Navy	Captain de la Pallière			around 100	Damage to rigging.
Brillant	64-gun	64	Ensign of the French Royal Navy	Captain Armand de Saint-Félix				
Sévère	64-gun	64	Ensign of the French Royal Navy	Captain Chevalier de Villeneuve-Cillart				
Ajax	64-gun	64	Ensign of the French Royal Navy	Admiral Pierre André de Suffren (transferred from Héros after she was disabled); Captain Bouvet	4	11	15	Captain Bouvet incapacited.
Annibal	74-gun	74	Ensign of the French Royal Navy	Captain Bernard Boudin de Tromelin				
Flamand	54-gun	54	Ensign of the French Royal Navy	Captain de Cuverville				
Bizarre	64-gun	64	Ensign of the French Royal Navy	Captain la Landelle-Roscanvec				
Casualties: 130 killed, 364 wounded

French light units
Ship	Rate	Guns	Navy	Commander	Casualties			Notes
Ship	Rate	Guns	Navy	Commander	Killed	Wounded	Total	Notes
Fine	frigate	32	Ensign of the French Royal Navy	Lieutenant Périer de Salvert				Collided with HMS Isis before unentangling herself, then ran aground, then caught fire, but managed to save herself.
Pourvoyeuse	frigate	32	Ensign of the French Royal Navy	Lieutenant Tromelin-Lanuguy				
Casualties:

British squadron
Ship	Rate	Guns	Navy	Commander	Casualties			Notes
Ship	Rate	Guns	Navy	Commander	Killed	Wounded	Total	Notes
HMS Exeter	Fourth rate	64	Ensign of the British Royal Navy	Captain King				
HMS Sultan	Third rate	74	Ensign of the British Royal Navy	Captain Watt				
HMS Eagle	Fourth rate	64	Ensign of the British Royal Navy	Captain Reddal				
HMS Burford	Fourth rate	64	Ensign of the British Royal Navy	Captain Peter Rainier				
HMS Monmouth	Fourth rate	64	Ensign of the British Royal Navy	Captain James Alms				
HMS Superb	Third rate	74	Ensign of the British Royal Navy	Admiral Edward Hughes; Captain Stevens				
HMS Monarca	Third rate	74	Ensign of the British Royal Navy	Captain John Gell				
HMS Magnanime	Fourth rate	64	Ensign of the British Royal Navy	Captain Wolsely				
HMS Isis	Fourth rate	50	Ensign of the British Royal Navy	Captain Lamley				Collided with Fine
HMS Hero	Third rate	74	Ensign of the British Royal Navy	Captain Hawker				
HMS Worcester	Fourth rate	64	Ensign of the British Royal Navy	Captain Wood				
Casualties:
