= Suffren (disambiguation) =

Suffren can have the following meanings:

People:

- Joseph Jean Baptiste Suffren (1651-1737)
- Pierre André de Suffren de Saint Tropez (1729–1788), French admiral

Ships:

- French ship Suffren, eight ships of the French Navy named after the admiral
- Suffren, a steamship originally named Blücher (steamship)
- Suffren-class nuclear submarine of the French Navy (2020–present)
