= Charles Gaspard Hyacinthe de Forbin La Barben =

Naval officer

Charles Gaspard Hyacinthe de Forbin La Barben (Aix-en-Provence, 26 February 1741 — ?) was a French Navy officer. He fought in the Indian Ocean under Suffren during the War of American Independence, captaining the 64-gun Vengeur at the Battle of Porto Praya on 16 April 1781, the Battle of Sadras on 17 February 1782, the Battle of Providien on 12 April 1782, the Battle of Negapatam on 6 July 1782, and the Battle of Trincomalee from 25 August to 3 September 1782. He was one of the officers that Suffren dismissed in the wake of the Battle of Trincomalee.

== Biography ==
Forbin was born to the family of Claude de Forbin. He was also a parent to Suffren, as Suffren's great-grandmother was from the Forbin family.

Forbin joined the Navy as a Garde-Marine on 7 October 1756. He was promoted to Lieutenant on 27 November 1765, and to Captain on 13 March 1779.

In September 1781, he was first officer on Terrible in the squadron under Admiral d'Estaing.

Forbin was appointed to the 64-gun Vengeur. He took part in the Battle of Porto Praya on 16 April 1781.

After the Battle of Sadras on 17 February 1782, Suffren wrote that he had "correctly kept his station".

At the Battle of Providien on 12 April 1782, Forbin's Vengeur stayed largely out of the action. Engaged by HMS Exeter, she veered to aim her broadside at her, which prevented her from closing the distance. In consequence, the two ships exchanged fire from too large a distance and were ineffectual.

At the Battle of Negapatam on 6 July 1782, Forbin failed to keep the line of battle. He still took part in the Battle of Trincomalee from 25 August to 3 September 1782, but after the battle, Suffren relieved him from command and sent him back to France, along with Cillart and Bidé de Maurville.

At his return to France, he was imprisoned at Pont-Saint-Esprit castle. His conduct was later attributed "more to incompetence and a lack of character than to ill will", he was freed and asked to resign. He was retired on 12 September 1784. (Note: "Sa Majesté, ayant été informée que cet officier avait montré dans sa conduite plus d'incapacité et de défaut de caractère que de mauvaise volonté, elle l'a fait mettre en liberté, en lui enjoignant de demander sa retraite, qui lui a été accordée sans satisfaction, le 12 september 1784".)

At the French Revolution, Forbin became an émigré.

== Sources and references ==
Notes

Bibliography

- Cunat, Charles (1852). Histoire du Bailli de Suffren. Rennes: A. Marteville et Lefas.
- Lacour-Gayet, G. (1910). La marine militaire de la France sous le règne de Louis XV. Paris: Honoré Champion.
- Roussel, Claude-Youenn; Forrer, Claude (2019). Tromeling et Suffren, un conflit entre marins. Kronos. ISBN 978-2-917232-88-0.
