= French ship Brillant (1774) =

64-gun Solitaire-class ship of the line of the French Navy

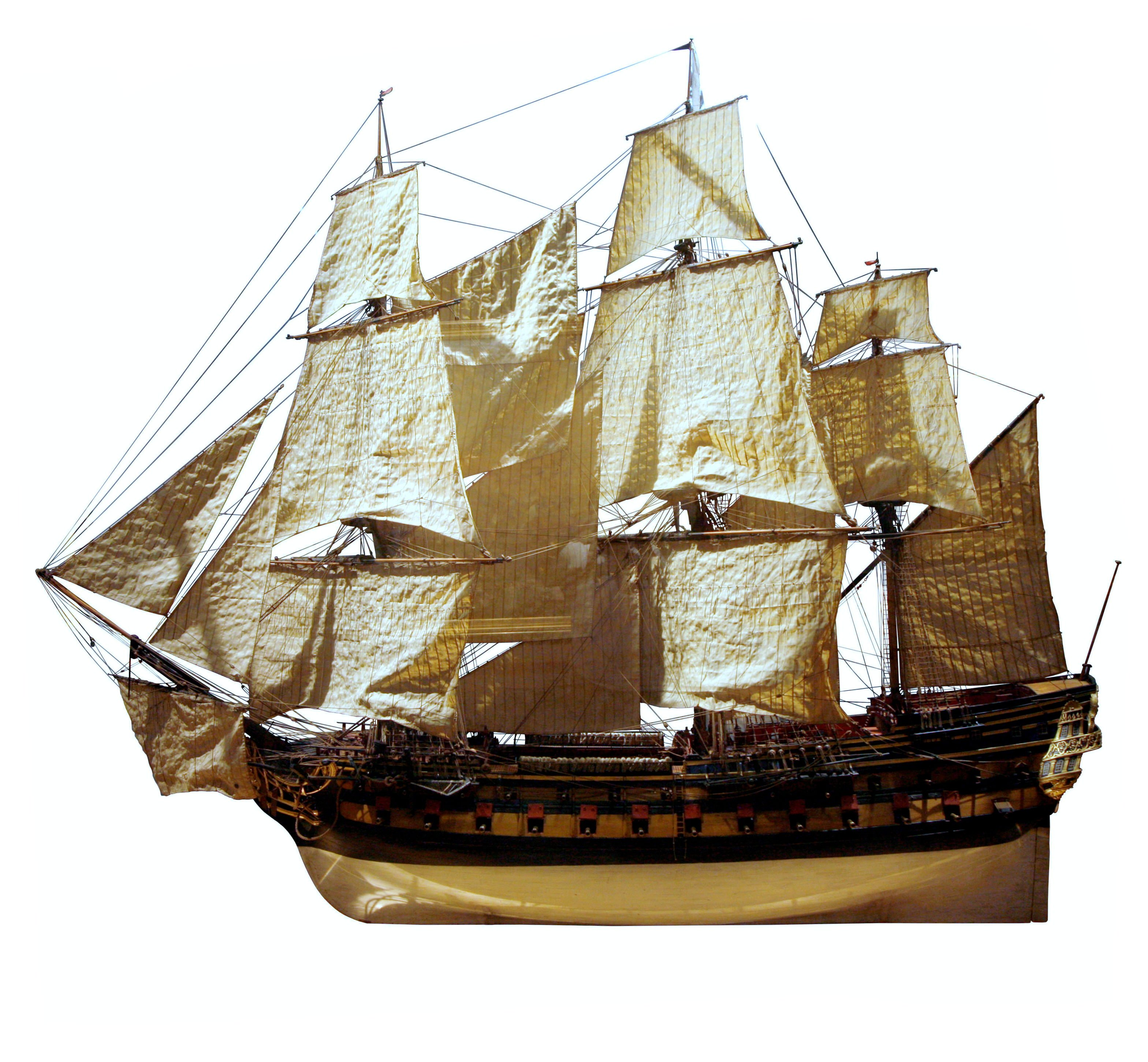
- Model of a 64-gun ship from the 1770s of the same type as the Brillant

History

France
- Name: Brillant
- Builder: Brest
- Laid down: November 1772
- Launched: September 1774
- Commissioned: December 1774
- Out of service: June 1786
- Fate: Broken up 1797

General characteristics
- Class & type: Solitaire class ship of the line
- Displacement: 2300 tonneaux
- Tons burthen: 1200 port tonneaux
- Length: 51 metres
- Beam: 13.2 metres
- Draught: 6.4 metres
- Propulsion: Sails
- Sail plan: Full-rigged ship
- Armament: 26×24-pounder long guns; 28×12-pounder long guns; 10×6-pounder long guns

Brillant was a 64-gun Solitaire-class ship of the line of the French Navy.

== Career ==
Brillant served in Suffren's campaign in the Indian Ocean, taking part in the Battle of Cuddalore. She was the main unit of the French force that drove away Commodore Vernon's squadron at the Siege of Pondicherry on 10 August 1779, and distinguished herself at the Battle of Sadras. She was present at the battles of Negapatam under Captain Armand de Saint-Félix.

In July 1782, in the wake of the Battle of Negapatam, Suffren transferred Saint-Félix to Artésien (Note: The captain of Artésien, Bidé de Maurville, had fallen out of favour with Suffren following the Battle of Negapatam) and replaced him with Jean André de Pas de Beaulieu, of Bellone. The frigate Pourvoyeuse had to give her mainmast to replace that of Brillant, receiving herself that of Fortitude.

In the reshuffling of Suffren's captains in July, his nephew Pierrevert had been given command of Bellone, but shortly afterwards Pierrevert was killed in the action of 12 August 1782. Consequently, Suffren returned Beaulieu to Bellone, and replaced him on Brillant with Lieutenant de Kersauson.

Brillant fought at the Trincomalee between 25 August and 3 September 1782 under Lieutenant de Kersauson.

In the night of 12 January 1783, chasing the frigate Fine which she had mistaken for a privateer, HMS Coventry (1757) sailed into Ganjam Roads, where Suffren's Héros, Illustre, Ajax and Brillant were at anchor. Captain Wolseley, of Coventry, had no information that French vessels were in the area and so allowed the current to take him towards the vessels, the wind being weak. As Coventry arrived, Suffren, on Héros, was sending a boat over to Illustre, but the boat master was drunk and instead mistakenly came aboard Coventry. The boat's crew was promptly taken prisoners and taken to the orlop deck. At this moment, the French division noticed Coventry, and Illustre, Ajax and Brillant opened fire. Interrogating his prisoners, Wolseley learnt that the ships firing on him were part of Suffren's squadron, at which point his men rushed below. Alone on his quarterdeck, Wolseley had no choice but to surrender.

Brillant took part in the Battle of Cuddalore on 20 June 1783.

== Fate ==
After returning to France, Brillant was hulked in Cherbourg from 1787. She was struck in 1795, and broken up in 1797.
