= Étienne-François de Cillart de Villeneuve =

French aristocrat and Navy officer

Étienne-François de Cillart de Villeneuve was a French aristocrat and Navy officer, brother to Armand-François Cillart de Surville and Jean-Marie de Villeneuve Cillart.

== Career ==
Cillart joined the Navy as a Garde-Marine on 19 March 1756. He was promoted to Ensign on 2 March 1762, to Lieutenant on 1 October 1773, and to Captain on 9 May 1781.

In October 1781, Cillart was in command of the frigate Bellone, escorting the transports Neker and Sévère off Cape of Good Hope. The squadron encountered the 50-gun HMS Hannibal, which captured the transports and brought them to Saint Helena. Bellone sailed on to Isle de France and reinforced the French squadron under Rear-Admiral Thomas d'Estienne d'Orves.

On 9 February 1782, Estienne d'Orves and Suffren assumed command of the squadron. He re-appointed his captains and promoted Cillart to the command of the 64-gun Sévère, while Jean André de Pas de Beaulieu took command of Bellone.

Cillart commanded Sévère at the Battle of Sadras on 17 February 1782 and at the Battle of Providien on 12 April 1782.

At the Battle of Negapatam, on 6 July 1782, Sévère was opposed to HMS Sultan. At the opening of the battle, First Officer Chevalier de la Salle (capitaine de brûlot) was wounded and had to be carried below, and Manoeuver officer De Gênes had a leg shot off. Seeing this, Villeneuve-Cillart panicked and attempted to struck his colours. Junior officers Dieu and Kerlero de Rosbo refused to accept to surrender and resumed their fire, raking Sultan, and forcing Cillart to rehoist his flag. (Note: When known in France, the anecdote yielded the pun that "Villeneuve-Cilart wanted to surrender, but "God" (Dieu, the name of the insubordinate officer) would not allow it". Dieu would be killed on Sévère at the Battle of Cuddalore on 20 June 1783.)

The day after the battle, HMS Rodney joined up as cartel with Héros, carrying Captain James Watt of HMS Sultan with a letter from Hughes demanding that Suffren hand over Sévère after her surrender. Suffren answered that he was unaware that Sévère had surrendered and promised to launch an investigation, and also warned that without orders from his government he was not at liberty to give away his ships. In the evening, Suffren was fully appraised of Cillart's conduct, and had him brought on his flagship Héros. He relieved him of duty on the spot and sent him back to Isle de France (Mauritius) and from there to France, to be court-martialed.

Rather to stand trial, Cillart escaped on a neutral ship and went in exile. Suffren also relieved of duty captains Bidé de Maurville of Artésien and Forbin of Vengeur, and sent several other officers to Isle de France.
