= French ship Éveillé =

Ten ships of the French Navy have borne the name Éveillé ("awakened"):

== Ships named Éveillé ==
- Éveillé (1670), a 20-gun ship of the line
- Éveillé (1672), a 24-gun ship of the line
- Éveillé (1676), a fireship
- Éveillé (1700), a 32-gun ship of the line
- Éveillé (1752), a 64-gun ship of the line
- Éveillé (1772), an Artésien-class ship of the line
- Éveillé (1788), a Hasard class brig-aviso
- Éveillé (1809), a gunbrig
- Éveillé (1917), an Agile-class minesweeper
- Éveillé (1944), a PC-461-class submarine chaser, former USS PC-471
