= Anne René Augustin de Roscanvec de La Landelle =

French naval officer of the War of American Independence

Anne René Augustin de Roscanvec de La Landelle (6 May 1735 —) was a French Navy officer. He notably captained the 64-gun Bizarre at the Battle of Sadras on 17 February 1782, at the Battle of Providien on 12 April 1782, at the Battle of Negapatam on 6 July 1782, and at the Battle of Trincomalee from 25 August to 3 September 1782.

== Biography ==
La Landelle-Roscanvec was born to a noble family of Bretagne. He was a nephew of Emmanuel-Auguste de Cahideuc, Comte Dubois de la Motte.

La Landelle-Roscanvec joined the Navy as a Garde-Marine on 17 September 1751. He was promoted to Ensign in 1756, to Lieutenant on 13 March 1764.

On 28 April 1764, he married Suzanne jeanne Armande d'Andigné, at Vannes.

He was promoted to Captain on 13 March 1779.

He commanded the 64-gun Bizarre at the Battle of Sadras on 17 February 1782, at the Battle of Providien on 12 April 1782, at the Battle of Negapatam on 6 July 1782, and at the Battle of Trincomalee from 25 August to 3 September 1782.

La Landelle-Roscanvec requested to be relieved and left the squadron after the Battle of Trincomalee, embarking on Pulvérisateur on 3 September 1782, bound for Isle de France.

He was retired from the Navy on 25 July 1784, and on 31 July 1784, Navy Minister Castrie listed him as one of the six officers who had "conducted themselves badly". (Note: The six listed are Captain Cillart (for attempting to surrender Sévère at the Battle of Negapatam), Captain La Landelle-Roscanvec, Lieutenant Tréhouret de Pennelé (for wrecking Bizarre), Lieutenant La Boixière (for poor performance as first officer of Artésien at the Battle of Porto Praya) and Ensign la Pallière (for wrecking Orient).)

== Sources and references ==
Notes

Bibliography

- Cunat, Charles (1852). Histoire du Bailli de Suffren. Rennes: A. Marteville et Lefas.
- Lacour-Gayet, G. (1910). La marine militaire de la France sous le règne de Louis XV. Paris: Honoré Champion.
- Mazas, Alex; Anne, Théodore (1860). Histoire de L'ordre royal et militaire de Saint-Louis depuis son institution en 1693 jusqu'en 1830. Paris: Firmin Didot frères.
- Roussel, Claude-Youenn; Forrer, Claude (2019). Tromeling et Suffren, un conflit entre marins. Kronos. ISBN 978-2-917232-88-0.
