= Jean Baptiste Christy de La Pallière =

French Navy officer

Jean Baptiste Christy de La Pallière (6 May 1719, in Saint-Malo – 8 September 1787, in Inzinzac-Lochrist) was a French Navy officer. He notably he captained the 74-gun Orient at the Battle of Sadras on 17 February 1782, at the Battle of Providien on 12 April 1782, at the Battle of Negapatam on 6 July 1782, and at the Battle of Trincomalee from 25 August to 3 September 1782.

== Biography ==
Christy de La Pallière started sailing with the French East India Company in 1732, under his cousin Mahé de La Bourdonnais. During the War of the Austrian Succession, he commanded a 40-gun armed East Indiaman in a squadron under Guy François de Kersaint. He took part in the first French expedition to Cochinchina. By 1756, he had risen to the rank of Commander.

In 1778, at the outbreak of the Anglo-French War, he was promoted to Captain for a mission to the Indian Ocean, and appointed to the 64-gun Sévère. On 27 March 1779, Sévère departed with the transports Hercule and Trois-Amis. The squadron called the Cape in late June, and departed for the last leg of the journey on 13 July, arriving at Port-Louis on 9 August 1779, after a scurvy-plagued voyage.

After Thomas d'Estienne d'Orves died, on 9 February 1782, Suffren promoted La Pallière to the command of his ship, the 74-gun Orient. La Pallière captained her at the Battle of Sadras on 17 February 1782, at the Battle of Providien on 12 April 1782, and at the Battle of Negapatam on 6 July 1782, and at the Battle of Trincomalee from 25 August to 3 September 1782.

On 8 September 1782, Orient ran aground at Pointe de Sale, near Trincomalee, and she became a total loss. La Pallière was incapacitated by an attack of gout and had left his son, Ensign Jean Anne Christy de La Pallière, in charge. Ensign La Pallière was dismissed from the Navy, although he was later reinstated, retiring in July 1816 with the honorary rank of contre-amiral.
