= French corvette Subtile =

French Navy 24-gun corvette

History

France
- Name: Subtile
- Builder: Rochefort.
- Laid down: May 1777
- Launched: 7 November 1777
- Fate: Hulked 1789

General characteristics
- Displacement: 320 tonnes
- Length: 35.7 metres
- Beam: 9.1 metres
- Draught: 4.7 metres
- Propulsion: Sail
- Armament: 20 to 26 guns

Subtile was a 24-gun corvette of the French Navy

== Career ==
From 1777 to 1778, she was under Lieutenant Bidé de Maurville.

During the War of American Independence, Subtile served in the Indian Ocean in a squadron under Rear-Admiral Thomas d'Estienne d'Orves. Lieutenant Périer de Salvert was in command from 13 September 1780 to 1 November.

On 9 February 1782, Estienne d'Orves died and Suffren assumed command of the squadron. He re-appointed his captains and gave Tromelin de La Nuguy command of Subtile.

She took part in the Battle of Negapatam under Huon de Kermadec on 6 July 1782. (Note: Cunat appears to have misread Kermadec's name as "Kermadie".)

In the year 1787, she sailed for a cruise to China with Résolution (under Bruni d'Entrecasteaux), arriving on 7 February 1787, two days after Lapérouse had left.

In November 1788, she was decommissioned in Toulon and became a hulk in 1789.
