= Edward Hughes (Royal Navy officer) =

Royal Navy officer (1716–1794)

Admiral Sir Edward Hughes
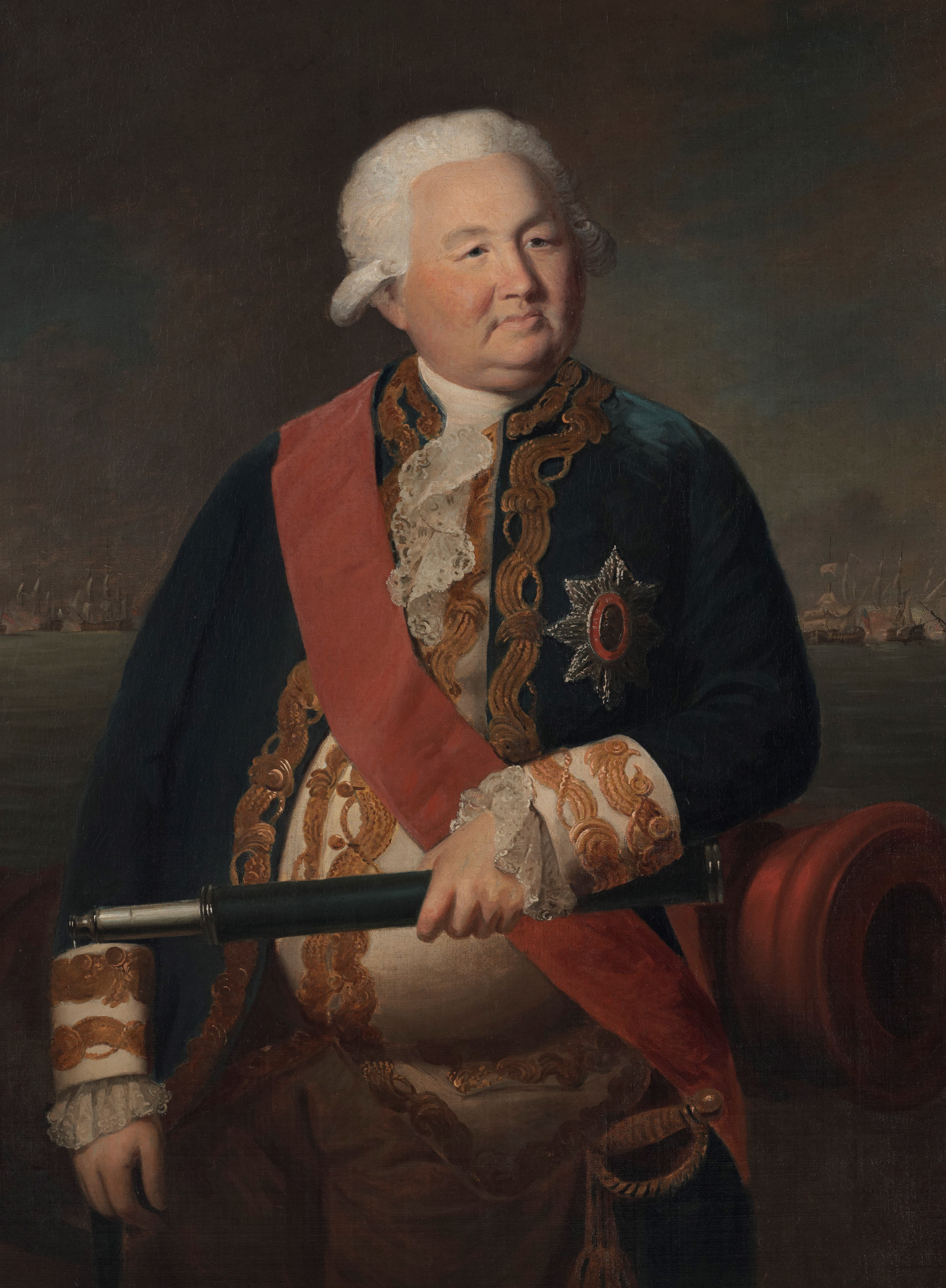
- c. 1786 portrait
- Born: 1716; Hertfordshire, England
- Died: 17 January 1794 (aged 77–78); Luxborough, Somerset
- Military career
- Allegiance: Great Britain
- Branch: Royal Navy
- Service years: 1735–1794
- Rank: Admiral of the Blue
- Commands: HMS Larke; HMS Somerset; East Indies Station
- Conflicts: War of Jenkins' Ear; Battle of Porto Bello (1739); Battle of Cartagena de Indias; Battle of Toulon (1744); Voyage of the Glorioso; Seven Years' War; Siege of Louisbourg (1758); Siege of Quebec (1759); American War of Independence; Battle of Sadras; Battle of Providien; Battle of Negapatam (1782); Battle of Trincomalee; Battle of Cuddalore (1783)

Admiral of the Blue Sir Edward Hughes (c. 1716 – 17 January 1794) was a Royal Navy officer who served in the War of Jenkins' Ear, Seven Years' War and American War of Independence. He is best known for fighting a series of five fleet actions during the American War of Independence with a French fleet under Pierre André de Suffren.

== Naval career ==
Edward Hughes was born c. 1716 in Hertfordshire. He joined the Royal Navy in 1735 and was present at the capture of Porto Bello in 1739 during the War of Jenkin's Ear. He was promoted to lieutenant on 25 August 1740 and served in the Cartagena expedition of 1741 and at the indecisive Battle of Toulon in 1744. Hughes was promoted again to captain on 6 February 1747 and participated in the action against the Spanish ship of the line Glorioso. During the Seven Years' War, Hughes participated in the sieges of Louisbourg in 1758 and Quebec in 1759.

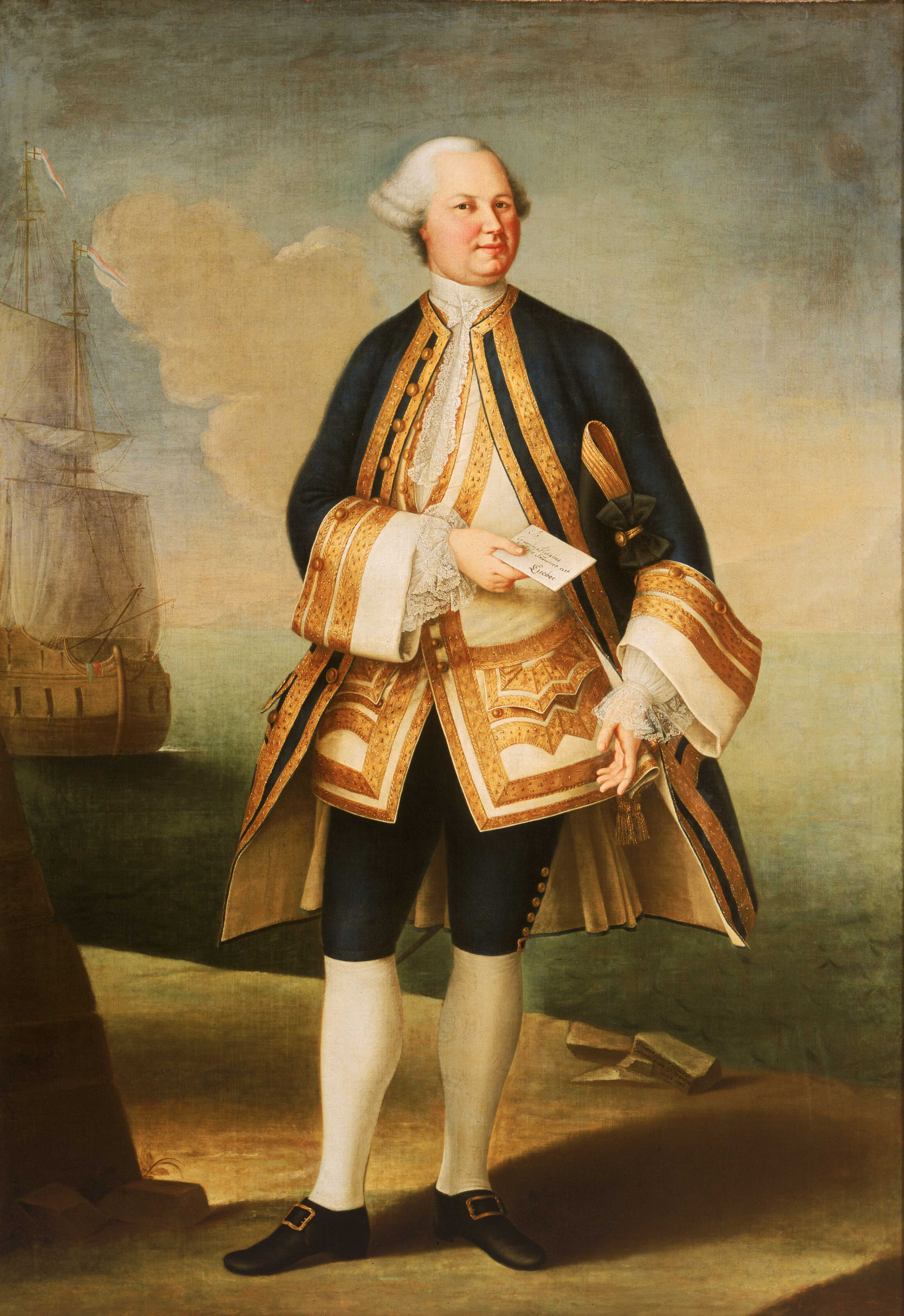
1761 portrait of Hughes by Violante Beatrice Siries

He was in continual employment during the peace, and as commodore, commanded the East Indies Station from 1773 to 1777. Before long, he returned to the East Indies Station with an overwhelming naval force, having been promoted to Rear-Admiral of the Blue on 23 January 1778. On his outward voyage, he captured Gorée from the French, and he was called upon to conduct only minor operations for the next two years, as the enemy could not muster any force fit to meet the powerful squadron Hughes had brought from the Channel. With Spain and Great Britain at war as part of the American War of Independence, Spanish authorities in Chile received a warning that Hughes was heading to Chilean coasts for an imminent attack. This attack, however, never happened. Hughes was promoted to Rear-Admiral of the Red on 19 March 1779 and again to Vice-Admiral of the Blue on 26 September 1780.

In 1782, at the reopening of hostilities in the East Indies, he stormed Trincomalee a few days before a French fleet under Vice-admiral Pierre André de Suffren arrived in the area. For the next year, these Indian waters were the scene of one of the most famous of naval campaigns. Suffren was one of the most talented officers to serve in the French navy, but his subordinates were factious and unskilful; Hughes on the other hand, whose ability was that born of long experience rather than genius, was well supported. No fewer than five fiercely contested general actions were fought by the two fleets, neither of them gaining a decisive advantage. In the end, Hughes held his ground.

== Later life and death ==
After the peace, Hughes returned to England, and, though promoted to Vice-Admiral of the White on 24 September 1787, Vice-Admiral of the Red on 21 September 1790 and Admiral of the Blue on 1 February 1793, he never again resumed active service. Hughes had accumulated considerable wealth during his service in India, which for the most part he spent in unostentatious charity. He died at his seat of Luxborough in Essex on 17 January 1794. His second wife, Ruth, died in 1800. Hughes' fortune went to Edward Hughes Ball Hughes (c. 1798 – 1863), her grandson by a previous marriage, who became the dandy and wastrel known as "The Golden Ball". The British East India Company ship the Sir Edward Hughes, launched in 1784, was named after him.

Military offices
Preceded by Robert Harland	Commander-in-Chief, East Indies Station; 1773–1777	Succeeded by Edward Vernon
Preceded by Edward Vernon	Commander-in-Chief, East Indies Station; 1780–1784	Succeeded by Andrew Mitchell
