= Battle of Sadras =

1782 battle of the American Revolutionary War

- Part of the American Revolutionary War
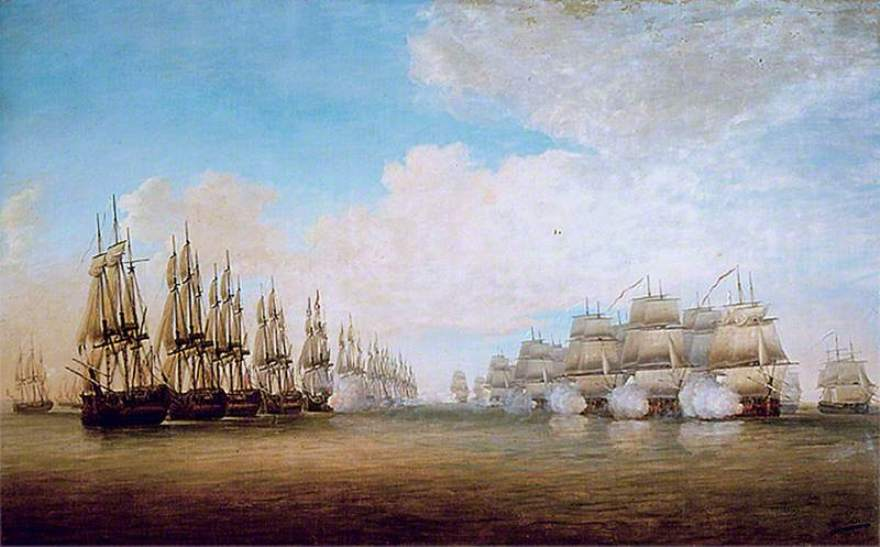
- 1782 painting of the battle
Date	17 February 1782
Location	Off Kalpakkam, Bay of Bengal 12°31′24.23″N 80°10′36.66″E
Result	Inconclusive

Belligerents
Great Britain	France

Commanders and leaders
Edward Hughes	Pierre André de Suffren

Strength
9 ships of the line	11 ships of the line

Casualties and losses
32 killed 83 wounded	30 killed 100 wounded

The Battle of Sadras was the first of five largely indecisive naval battles fought between a British fleet (under Vice-Admiral Sir Edward Hughes) and a French fleet (under Admiral Pierre Suffren) off the east coast of India during the Anglo-French War. Fought on 17 February 1782 near present-day Kalpakkam, the battle was tactically indecisive, but the British fleet suffered the most damage. Under Suffren's protection, French troop transports were able to land at Porto Novo, present-day Parangipettai.

== Background ==
France had entered the American Revolutionary War in 1778, and Britain had declared war on the Dutch Republic in late 1780 after the Dutch refused to stop trading with the French and the Americans. The British had rapidly gained control over most French and Dutch outposts in India when news of these events reached India, spawning the Second Anglo-Mysore War in the process.

The French admiral Bailli de Suffren was dispatched for military assistance to French colonies in India, leading a fleet of five ships of the line, seven transports, and a corvette to escort transports from Brest in March 1781. Suffren was involved in a happenstance battle with a British fleet at Porto Praya in the Cape Verde Islands in April. In October, he left reinforcement troops at the Dutch-controlled Cape of Good Hope to assist with colonial defense. Suffren added some ships to his fleet and sailed on to the Île de France (present-day Mauritius), arriving at Port Louis in December.

After further additions at Port Louis, Suffren's fleet sailed for India under the command of the elderly Navy Brigadier General Thomas d'Estienne d'Orves, accompanying transports carrying nearly 3,000 men under the command of the Comte du Chemin. D'Orves died in February 1782, shortly before the fleet arrived off the Indian coast, and Suffren once again took command.

Suffren first sailed for Madras, hoping to surprise the British stronghold there. Encountering Hughes's fleet anchored in Madras on 15 February 1782, Suffren turned south. He intended to land troops at Porto Novo, march up the coast and recapture French and Dutch holdings on the way. Hughes raised anchor and sailed after Suffren.

== Battle ==
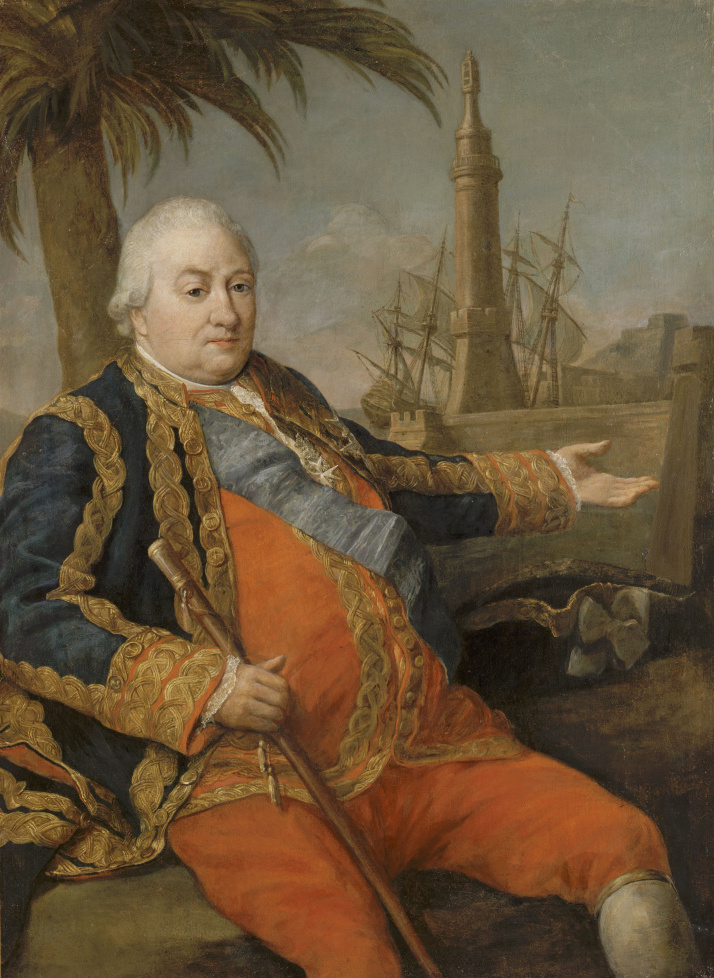
Portrait of Suffren by Pompeo Batoni

Suffren was hampered with protecting his troop convoys from Hughes, whose goal he presumed was to prevent the troops from landing. Detaching one corvette to protect the convoy and detailing another to watch the British fleet, Suffren attempted to draw Hughes away. However, under cover of night Hughes managed to slip between Suffren's squadron and the convoys. The signal was raised on the morning of 17 February, and Suffren gave chase to force battle.

When the fleets closed for action around 15:30, some of Suffren's ships had not properly formed the line of battle. Only five of the French ships engaged at first. Of the remaining six, only two joined the action later, with the other four apparently violating Suffren's orders and hanging back. Suffren, leading in Héros, exchanged a broadside with Exeter before targeting Hughes's flagship Superb. The battle lasted for over three hours, with Exeter sustaining the most damage. She was nearly sunk, but two French ships were recalled (for reasons unknown) before they could inflict enough damage to cause her to sink. Superb also suffered significant damage. The battle came to end with the onset of night.

== Aftermath ==
Suffren summoned his captains for council and chastised those who had chosen to stay out of the battle before following the troop convoy to Porto Novo. There the French army had landed, and Suffren met with the Mysorean ruler Hyder Ali to plan strategy. After making repairs, Suffren set off to find Hughes again. The French and Mysorean forces captured Cuddalore, just north of Porto Novo, on 4 April. Hughes sailed for Trincomalee, where he made repairs.

== Order of battle ==
Captain Suffren's squadron
Ship	Rate	Guns	Navy	Commander	Casualties			Notes
Ship	Rate	Guns	Navy	Commander	Killed	Wounded	Total	Notes
Bizarre	Third rate	64	Ensign of the French Royal Navy	Captain Chevalier de la Landelle-Roscanvec				
Orient	Third rate	74	Ensign of the French Royal Navy	Captain Jean Baptiste Christy de La Pallière				
Sphinx	Third rate	64	Ensign of the French Royal Navy	Captain Charles Louis du Chilleau de La Roche				
Vengeur	Third rate	64	Ensign of the French Royal Navy	Captain Charles Gaspard Hyacinthe de Forbin La Barben				
Héros	Third rate	74	Ensign of the French Royal Navy	Chef d'Escadre Pierre André de Suffren; Captain Félix d'Hesmivy de Moissac				
Hannibal	Fourth rate	50	Ensign of the French Royal Navy	Captain Justin Bonaventure Morard de Galles				
Annibal	Third rate	74	Ensign of the French Royal Navy	Captain Bernard Boudin de Tromelin				
Sévère	Third rate	64	Ensign of the French Royal Navy	Captain Chevalier de Villeneuve-Cillart				
Artésien	Third rate	64	Ensign of the French Royal Navy	Captain François-Joseph-Hippolyte Bidé de Maurville				
Ajax	Third rate	64	Ensign of the French Royal Navy	Captain René Joseph Bouvet de Précourt				
Brillant	Third rate	64	Ensign of the French Royal Navy	Captain Armand de Saint-Félix				
Flamand	Fourth rate	50	Ensign of the French Royal Navy	Captain Louis-Hyacinte de Cavelier de Cuverville				

British squadron
Ship	Rate	Guns	Navy	Commander	Casualties			Notes
Ship	Rate	Guns	Navy	Commander	Killed	Wounded	Total	Notes
HMS Eagle	Fourth rate	64	Ensign of the British Royal Navy	Captain Ambrose Reddall				
HMS Monmouth	Fourth rate	64	Ensign of the British Royal Navy	Captain James Alms				
HMS Worcester	Fourth rate	64	Ensign of the British Royal Navy	Captain George Talbot				
HMS Burford	Fourth rate	64	Ensign of the British Royal Navy	Captain Peter Rainier				
HMS Superb	Third rate	74	Ensign of the British Royal Navy	Vice-Admiral Sir Edward Hughes; Captain William Stevens				
HMS Hero	Third rate	74	Ensign of the British Royal Navy	Captain Charles Wood				
HMS Isis	Fourth rate	50	Ensign of the British Royal Navy	Captain Thomas Charles Lumley				
HMS Monarca	Third rate	68	Ensign of the British Royal Navy	Captain John Gell				
HMS Exeter	Fourth rate	64	Ensign of the British Royal Navy	Commodore Richard King; Captain Henry Reynolds				
