= Artésien-class ship of the line =

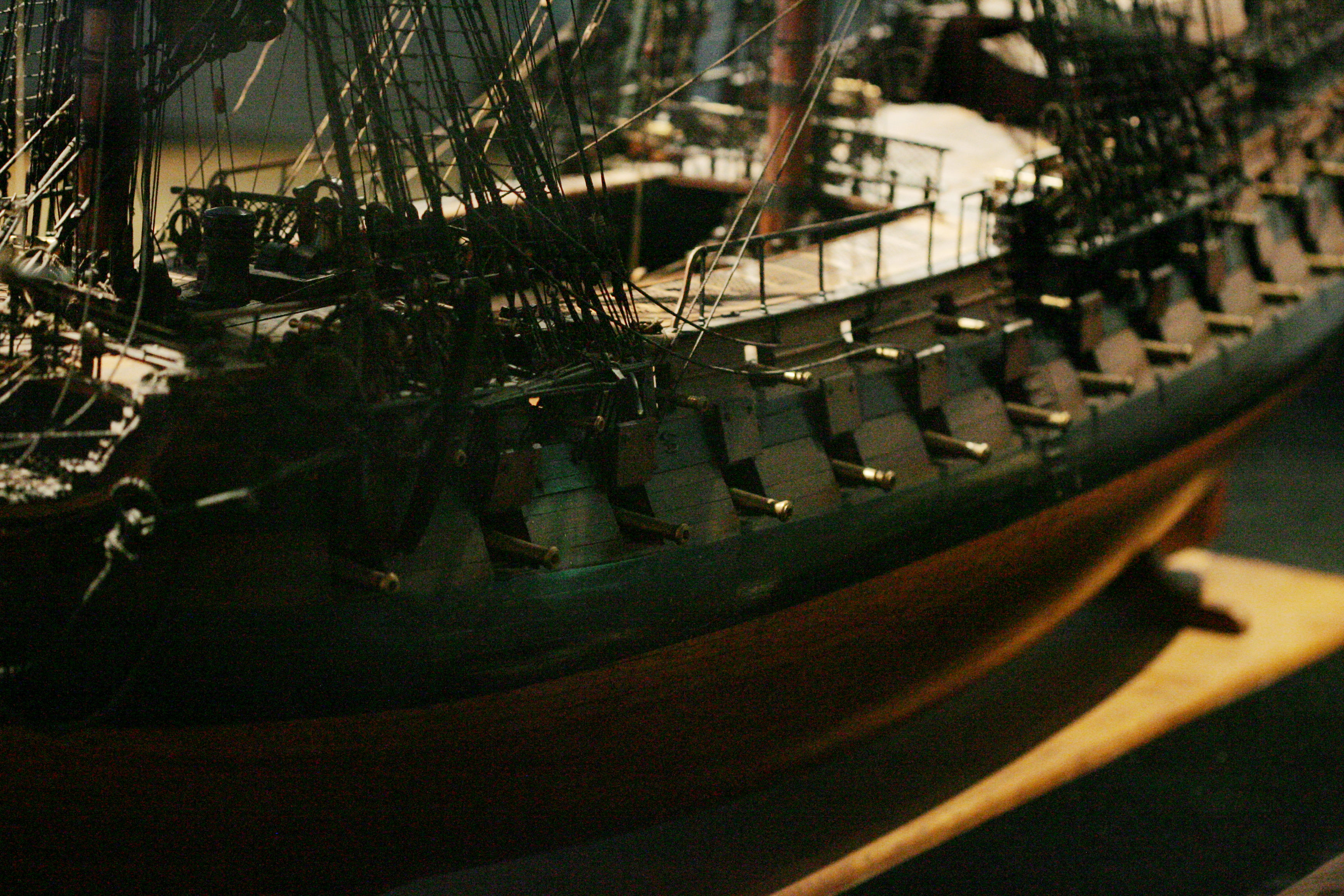
- Model of Artésien

Class overview
- Name: Artésien
- Operators: French Navy
- In commission: 1771–1785
- Planned: 5
- Completed: 5

General characteristics
- Type: Ship of the line
- Displacement: 2084 tonneaux
- Tons burthen: 1200 port tonneaux
- Length: 52.2 m (171 ft 3 in)
- Beam: 13.2 m (43 ft 4 in)
- Draught: 6.4 m (21 ft 0 in)
- Armament: 64 guns: 26 × 24-pounder long guns; 28 × 12-pounder long guns; 10 × 6-pounder long guns

The Artésien class was a type of 64-gun ships of the line of the French Navy. A highly detailed and accurate model of Artésien, lead ship of the class, was part of the Trianon model collection and is now on display at Paris naval museum.

== Ships in class ==
- Artésien

Builder:
Begun:
Launched: 1765
Completed:
Fate:

- Alexandre

Builder:
Begun:
Launched: 1771
Completed:
Fate:

- Roland

Builder:
Begun:
Launched: 1771
Completed:
Fate:

- Éveillé

Builder:
Begun:
Launched: 1772
Completed:
Fate:

- Protée

Builder:
Begun:
Launched: 1772
Completed:
Fate: Captured by the Royal Navy on 24 February 1780 and commissioned as HMS Prothee. Used as a prison ship from 1799 and broken up September 1815

== Sources ==
- Roche, Jean-Michel (2005). Dictionnaire des bâtiments de la flotte de guerre française de Colbert à nos jours, 1671–1870. Group Retozel-Maury Millau. ISBN 978-2-9525917-0-6. OCLC 165892922.
