= Jean André de Pas de Beaulieu =

French Navy officer

- Born: 14 January 1750 Montpellier
- Died: 11 August 1783 (aged 33) Port-Louis
- Branch: French Navy
- Conflicts: War of American Independence

Jean André de Pas de Beaulieu (Montpellier, 14 January 1750 — Port-Louis, 11 August 1783) was a French Navy officer.

== Biography ==
During the War of American Independence, Beaulieu served in the Indian Ocean in a squadron under Rear-Admiral Thomas d'Estienne d'Orves. On 9 February 1782, Estienne d'Orves died and Suffren assumed command of the squadron. He re-appointed his captains and gave Beaulieu command of the frigate Bellone.

In July 1782, in the wake of the Battle of Negapatam, Suffren transferred Saint-Félix to Artésien (Note: The captain of Artésien, Bidé de Maureville, had fallen out of favour with Suffren following the Battle of Negapatam) and replaced him with Beaulieu. (Note: Beaulieu being himself replaced by Chevalier de Pierre-Vert at the command of Bellone.)

In January 1783, he was in command of Petit Annibal.

However, Beaulieu commanded Bellone again at the Battle of Trincomalee, while Brillant was under Lieutenant de Kersauson. Beaulieu commanded the 50-gun Petit Annibal at the Battle of Cuddalore.

On 11 August 1783, he married Thérèse Euphrasie Bolgerd in Port-Louis.

== Sources and references ==
Notes

Bibliography

- Cunat, Charles (1852). Histoire du Bailli de Suffren. Rennes: A. Marteville et Lefas. pp. 447.
