= HMS Exeter (1763) =

Ship of the line of the Royal Navy

History

Great Britain
- Name: HMS Exeter
- Ordered: 13 January 1761
- Builder: Henniker, Chatham
- Launched: 26 July 1763
- Fate: Burned, 1784
- Notes: Participated in: Battle of Sadras; Battle of Providien; Battle of Negapatam; Battle of Trincomalee; Battle of Cuddalore

General characteristics
- Class & type: Exeter-class ship of the line
- Tons burthen: 1,340 tons
- Length: 158 ft 9 in (48.39 m) (gundeck)
- Beam: 44 ft (13 m)
- Depth of hold: 19 ft 1 in (5.82 m)
- Propulsion: Sails
- Sail plan: Full-rigged ship
- Armament: 64 guns: Gundeck: 26 × 24 pdrs; Upper gundeck: 26 × 18 pdrs; Quarterdeck: 10 × 4 pdrs; Forecastle: 2 × 9 pdrs

HMS Exeter was a 64-gun third rate ship of the line of the Royal Navy, launched on 26 July 1763 at Chatham Dockyard.

In 1782, Exeter was involved in the battles of Sadras, Providien, Negapatam and Trincomalee, and the Battle of Cuddalore in 1783.

In 1783, after peace returned between France and England and the British squadron was recalled, Exeter ran aground arriving at the Cape of Good Hope. The French squadron under Suffren had been anchored there for a few days, and both the British and French ships launched their boats to provide assistance.

In 1784 she was found to be unseaworthy, and was burned.
