= French ship Suffren =

To date, eight ships of the French Navy have borne the name of Suffren, in honour of the 18th-century French admiral Pierre André de Suffren.

== French ships named Suffren ==
- French ship Suffren (1791) (1791–1794), a Téméraire-class 74-gun ship of the line renamed Redoutable in 1794.
- French ship Suffren (1803) (1801–1815), a Téméraire-class 74-gun ship of the line.
- French ship Suffren (1824) (1824–1865), a 90-gun ship of the line.
- French ironclad Suffren (1866–1897), an armoured frigate.
- French battleship Suffren (1899–1916), a battleship.
- French cruiser Suffren (1926–1963), a heavy cruiser and name ship of the Suffren class.
- French frigate Suffren (1968–2008), a guided missile frigate.
- French submarine Suffren, a Barracuda-class submarine which was commissioned in 2020
Ships of the French Navy named Suffren
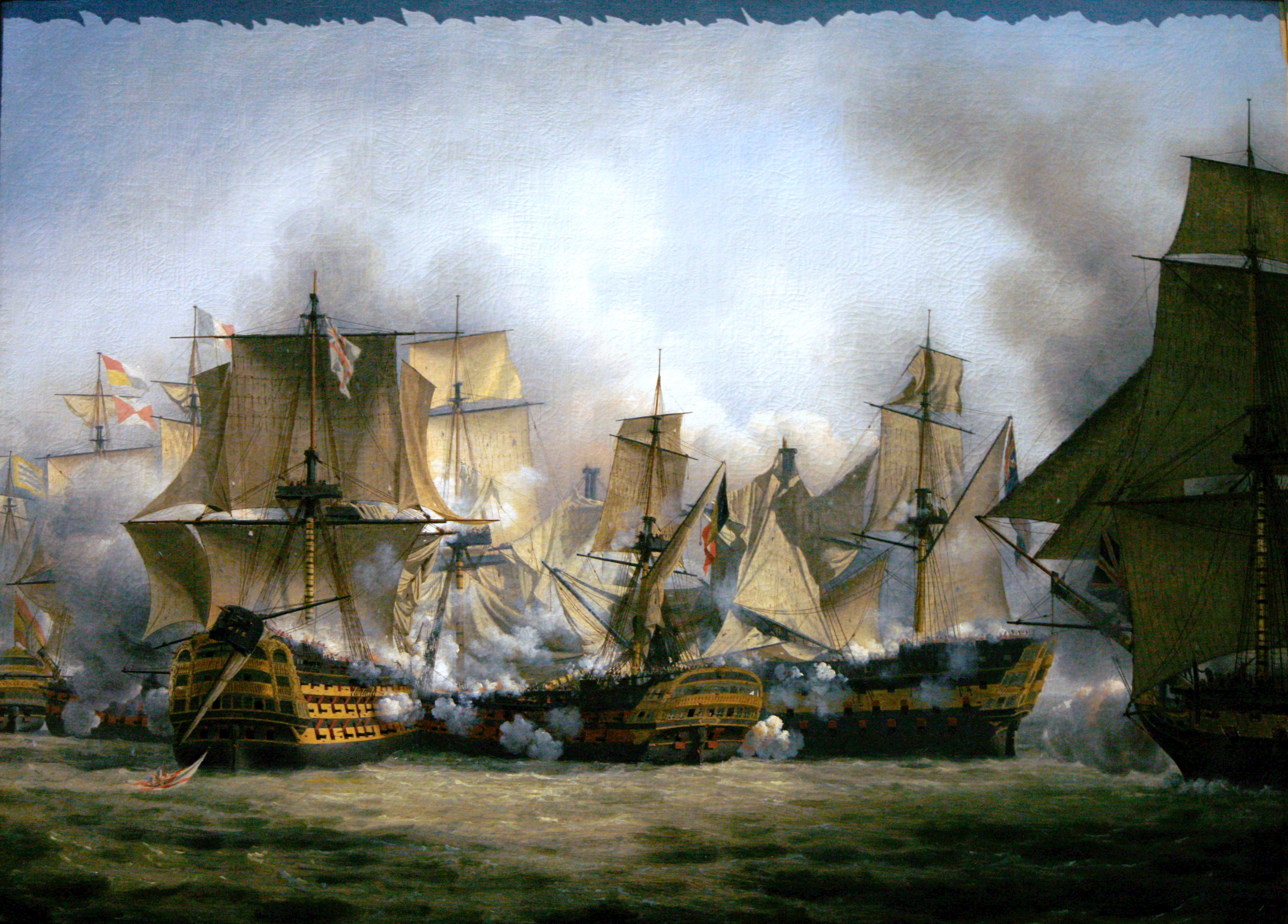
Redoutable (ex-Suffren of 1791) at Trafalgar

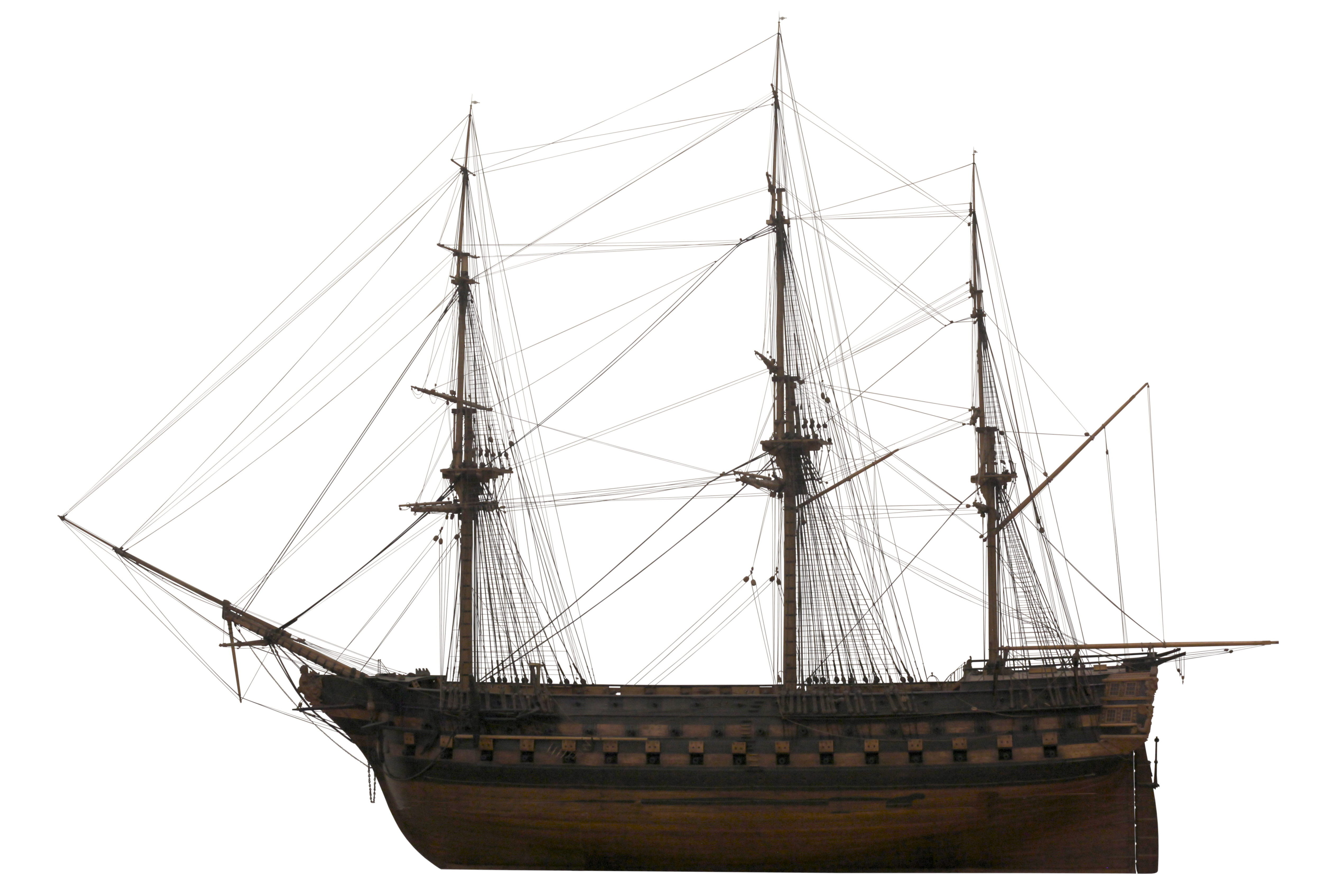
1/20th scale model of Suffren (1824–1865), on display at the Musée national de la Marine in Paris

Suffren (1899–1916)

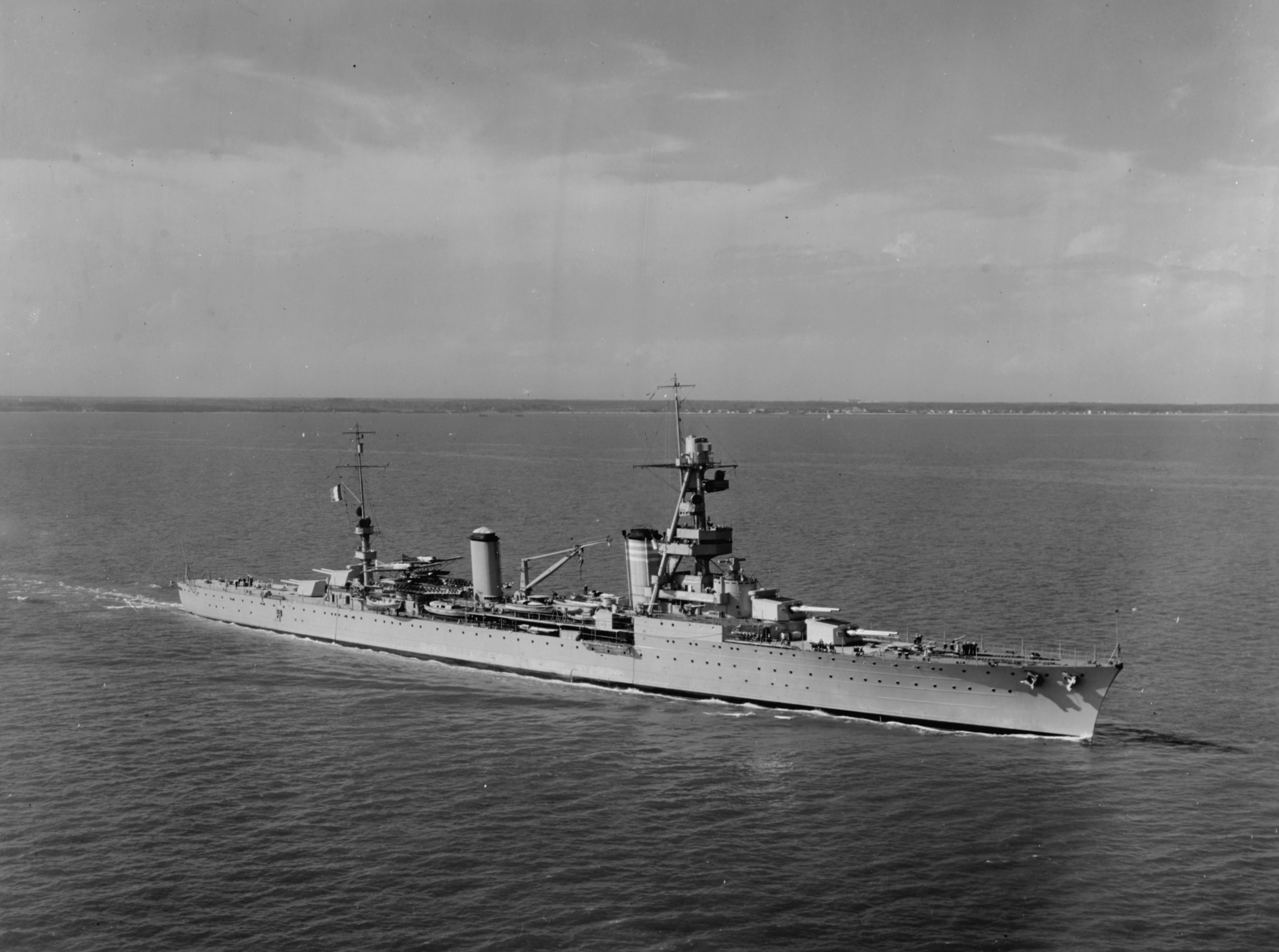
Suffren (1926–1963)

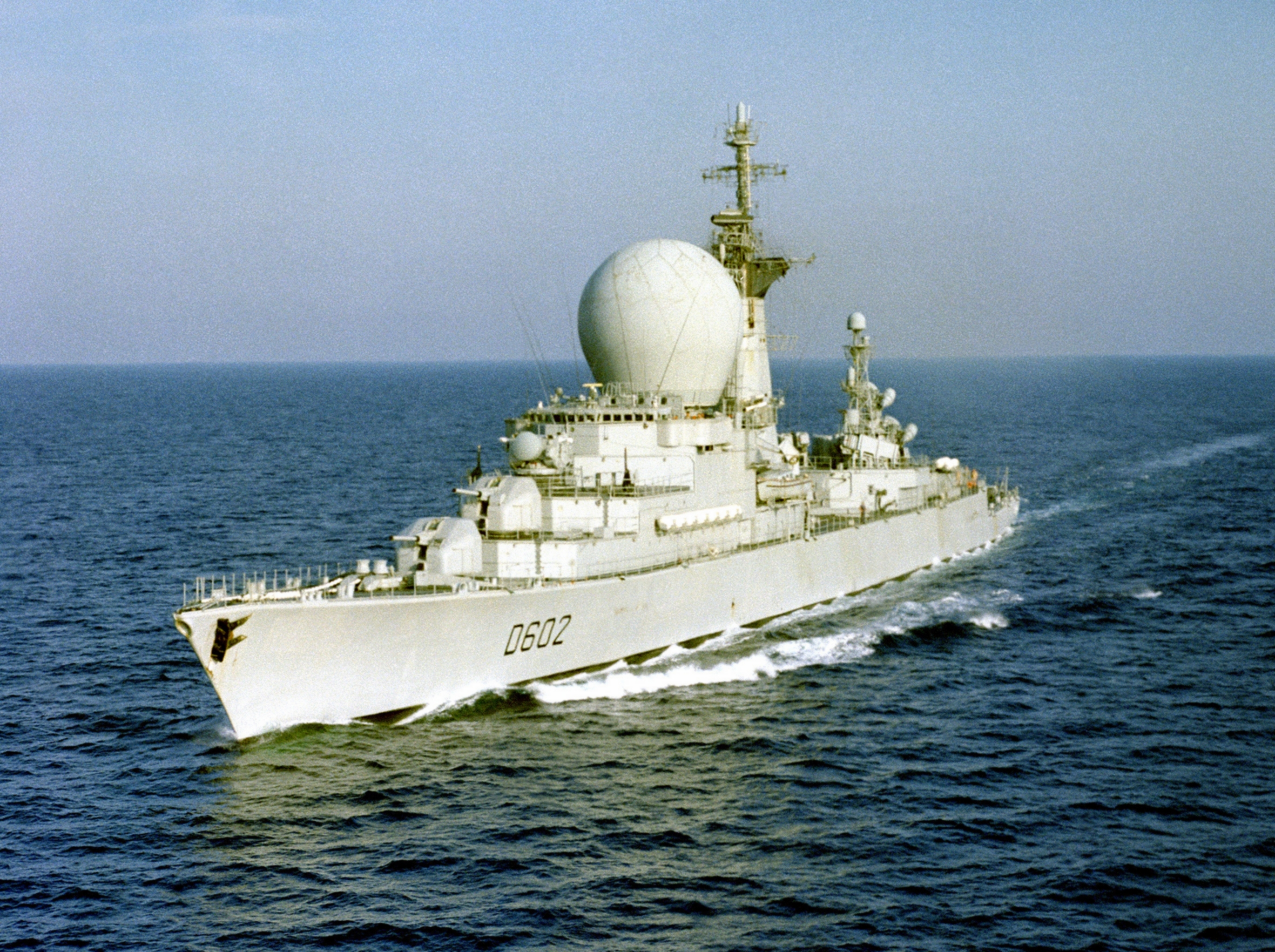
Suffren (D602, 1968–2008)

== Notes and references ==
=== Bibliography ===
- Roche, Jean-Michel (2005). Dictionnaire des bâtiments de la flotte de guerre française de Colbert à nos jours. Vol. 1. Group Retozel-Maury Millau. pp. 372–373. ISBN 978-2-9525917-0-6. OCLC 165892922.
- Roche, Jean-Michel (2005). Dictionnaire des bâtiments de la flotte de guerre française de Colbert à nos jours. Vol. 2. Group Retozel-Maury Millau. p. 250. ISBN 978-2-9525917-0-6. OCLC 165892922.
- Les bâtiments ayant porté le nom de Suffren. NetMarine.net. Retrieved 2011-12-02.
