= François-Joseph-Hippolyte Bidé de Maurville =

François-Joseph-Hippolyte Bidé de Maurville (Rochefort, 25 November 1743 — Rochefort, 29 January 1784) was a French Navy officer.

== Biography ==
Maurville was born to Marie Anne de Brach and Hippolyte Bernard Bidé de Maurville, an admiral in the French Navy, and brother to Charles-Alexandre de Maurville de Langle.

Maurville joined the Navy as a Garde-Marine on 25 April 1757. he served on Florissant from 1757 to 1760, on Intrépide in 1761, on Northumberland in 1762 and on Garonne from 1763 to 1764. The year after, he transferred on Utile, and in June 1765 he took part in the Larache expedition, where he was wounded. He was the sole surviving officer, and spent two years a prisoner in Morocco before returning to France in 1767. He had been promoted to Ensigh on 27 November 1765, while in captivity. In 1775, he published a Relation de l'Affaire de Larache telling his experience.

From November 1767 to 1768, he served on Bricole. He was promoted to Lieutenant on 15 August 1768 From April to September 1772, he was appointed to the frigate Terpsichore. From December 1772 to June 1773, he served on Bricole.

In 1776, he was given his first command, the corvette Sylphide. In 1777, he transferred to the corvette Subtile, until 1778. He rose to Captain on 13 March 1779.

During the War of American Independence, he commanded the frigate Pourvoyeuse. On 10 April 1782, he was at the Cape of Good Hope, along with the fluyts Éléphant and Lawriston, to fetch food supplies.

He commanded Artésien in the French squadron under Suffren, taking part in the Battle of Sadras on 17 February 1782, the Battle of Providien on 12 April 1782. On 5 June 1782, he failed to press his chase of the British 18-gun Raikes, against orders from Suffren.

Bidé de Maurville commanded Artésien at the Battle of Negapatam on 6 July 1782.

On 7 July 1782, following the Battle of Negapatam, Suffren dismissed him from Artésien, replacing him with Armand de Saint-Félix, and sent him back to France. Maurville was imprisoned at Île de Ré, and freed but expelled from the Navy on 25 July 1783.

== Sources and references ==
Notes

Bibliography

- Cunat, Charles (1852). Histoire du Bailli de Suffren. Rennes: A. Marteville et Lefas. p. 447.
- Meschinet de Richemond, Louis Marie (1906). Les Marins Rochelais, notes biographiques (in French). La Rochelle: A. FOUCHER.

Works

- Bidé de Maurville, François-Joseph-Hippolyte (1775). Relation de l'affaire de Larache. Amsterdam. p. 398.

External links

- Mézin, Anne. "Correspondance des Consuls de France à Cadix, Index prosopographique des noms de personnes" (PDF). Archives nationales.
- "François Joseph Hippolyte BIDE de MAURVILLE". Parcours de vie dans la Royale.
- "François-Joseph-Hippolyte Bidé de Maurville". Three Decks' Forum.
