= French ship Artésien =

64-gun ship of the line of the French Navy

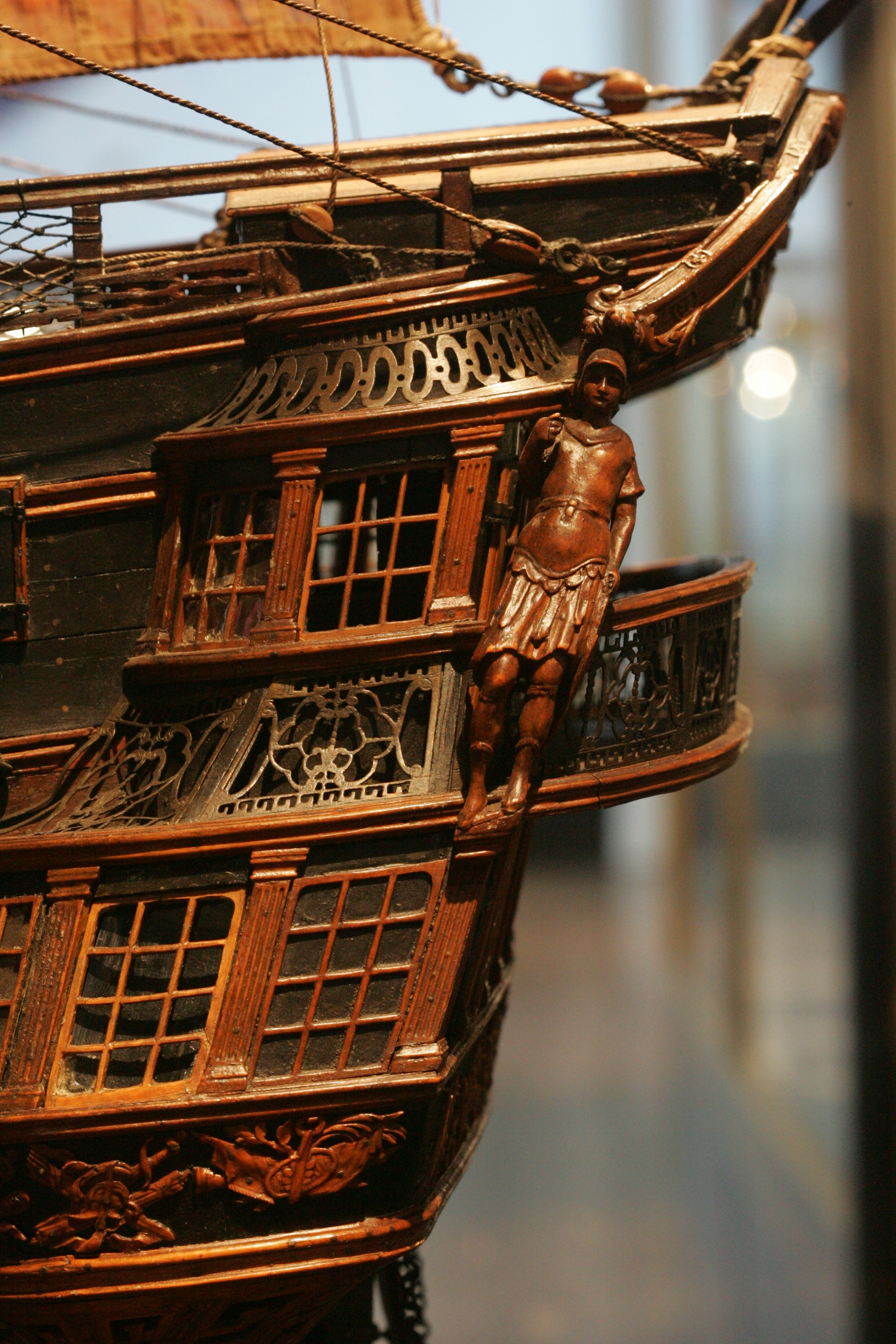
- Model on display at the Musée de la Marine

History

Kingdom of France
- Namesake: Artois
- Builder: Joseph Ollivier
- Laid down: Brest, 1764
- Launched: 7 March 1765
- Out of service: 1785
- Fate: Shear hulk

General characteristics
- Class & type: Artésien-class ship of the line
- Displacement: 2084 tonneaux
- Tons burthen: 1200 port tonneaux
- Length: 47 m (154 ft)
- Beam: 12 m (39 ft)
- Draught: 6 m (20 ft)
- Armament: 64 guns: 26 24-pounders; 28 12-pounders; 10 6-pounders
- Armour: timber

Artésien ('Artesian') was a 64-gun ship of the line of the French Navy, lead ship of her class. She was funded by a don des vaisseaux donation from the Estates of Artois.

== Career ==
Artésien was built in 1765 as a part of a series of twelve ships of the line began by Choiseul to compensate for the losses endured by the French Royal Navy during the Seven Years' War. She was paid by the province of Artois and Flanders, and named in its honour, according to the practice of the time.

During the American Revolutionary War, Artésien took part in the Battle of St. Lucia on 15 December 1778, in the Battle of Martinique on 17 April 1780, in the Siege of Savannah, under Captain Thomassin de Peynier.

In 1781, Artésien was attached to a division under Suffren, departing France for the Dutch Cape Colony and Isle de France (Mauritius). Off Cape Verde, Artésien detected a British squadron, resulting in the Battle of Porto Praya. Her captain, Cardaillac, was killed by a bullet to the chest at the beginning of the action, and was replaced by First officer de la Boixière.

At the Battle of Sadras on 17 February 1782, she was commanded by Captain Bidé de Maurville. On 7 July 1782, following the Battle of Negapatam, Suffren replaced Maureville with Armand de Saint-Félix. Artésien went on to take part in the Battle of Trincomalee from 25 August to 3 September 1782.

== Fate ==
Artésien was decommissioned in 1785 and used as a shear hulk.

== Legacy ==
A finely crafted 1/28th scale model was used to instruct Louis XVI in naval studies. The model is now on display at the Musée de la Marine.
