= List of ship launches in 1775 =

The list of ship launches in 1775 includes a chronological list of some ships launched in 1775.

Date	Ship	Class	Builder	Location	Country	Notes
17 January	Sévère	Indien-class East Indiaman	Gilles Cambry	Lorient	Kingdom of France	For Compagnie des Indes.
21 February	Prindsesse Sophia Friderica	Prindsesse Sophia Friderica-class ship of the line		Copenhagen	Denmark-Norway	For Dano-Norwegian Navy.
30 March	África	Xebec		Cartagena	Spain	For Spanish Navy.
18 April	Actaeon	Enterprise-class frigate		Woolwich Dockyard	Great Britain	For Royal Navy.
18 April	Berwick	Elizabeth-class ship of the line	Edward Hunt	Portsmouth Dockyard	Great Britain	For Royal Navy.
11 May	Liberty	Full-rigged ship		Boston, Massachusetts	Thirteen Colonies	For Continental Navy.
26 June	Consolante	Pourvoyeuse-class frigate	Jacques Boux	Lorient	France	For French navy.
28 June	Stirling Castle	Worcester-class ship of the line	William Pownall	Chatham Dockyard	Great Britain	For Royal Navy.
29 June	San Eugenio	Third rate	Francisco Gautier	Bilbao	Spain	For Spanish Navy.
12 August	Atalanta	Swan-class ship-sloop	George White	location	Great Britain	For Royal Navy.
August	Congress	Galley	Emanuel Eyres		Thirteen Colonies	For Pennsylvania Navy.
12 September	Compas	Gabarre	Jean-Joseph Ginoux	Havre de Grâce	Kingdom of France	For French Navy.
date	Sphinx	Sphinx-class ship	Edward Hunt	Portsmouth Dockyard	Great Britain	For Royal Navy.
25 October	Bristol	Portland-class ship of the line	George White	Sheerness Dockyard	Great Britain	For Royal Navy.
27 October	Bedford	Royal Oak-class ship of the line	Nicholas Phillips	Woolwich Dockyard	Great Britain	For Royal Navy.
23 December	Sultan	Royal Oak-class ship of the line	William Barnard	Harwich	Great Britain	For Royal Navy.
Summer	Royal Savage	Schooner		St. John	(Kingdom of Great Britain) Province of Quebec	For private owner.
Unknown date	Arnold	Floating battery		Pennsylvania	Thirteen Colonies	For Pennsylvania Navy.
Unknown date	Betsey	Snow		Bombay	India	For British East India Company.
Unknown date	Bolton	Sloop-of-war		New York	Thirteen Colonies	For Royal Navy.
Unknown date	Byramgore	Full-rigged ship		Bombay	India	For private owner.
Unknown date	Caranga	Schooner		Bombay	India	For Bombay Pilot Service.
Unknown date	Experiment	Galley	John Wharton		Thirteen Colonies	For Pennsylvania Navy.
Unknown date	Franklin	Schooner	Manuel Eyre	Kensington, Pennsylvania	Thirteen Colonies	For private owner.
Unknown date	General Washington	Galley	John Wharton		Thirteen Colonies	For Pennsylvania Navy.
Unknown date	Katy	Sloop	John Brown	Providence, Rhode Island	Thirteen Colonies	For private owner.
Unknown date	Middelburg	East Indiaman		Middelburg	Dutch Republic	For Dutch East India Company.
Unknown date	Mürg-ı Bahri	Fifth rate		Rhodes	Ottoman Greece	For Ottoman Navy.
Unknown date	Olive Branch	Merchantman		Philadelphia, Pennsylvania	Thirteen Colonies	For private owner.
Unknown date	Ranger	Galley	Samuel Robins		Thirteen Colonies	For Pennsylvania Navy.
Unknown date	Salvey	Full-rigged ship		Bombay	India	For private owner.
Unknown date	Santa Dorotea	Fifth rate		Ferrol	Spain	For Spanish Navy.
Unknown date	Santo Miguel	Fifth rate		Daman	(Portugal) Portuguese India	For Portuguese Navy.
Unknown date	Tannah	Schooner		Bombay Dockyard	India	For Bombay Pilot Service.
Unknown date	Turtle	Submersible	David Bushnell	Connecticut	Thirteen Colonies	For Continental Navy.
Unknown date	Vivid	Schooner	Nicholas Bools	Bridport	Great Britain	For Thomas Geiston.
Unknown date	Name unknown	Merchantman			Kingdom of France	For private owner.
Unknown date	Name unknown	Merchantman			Kingdom of France	For private owner.
Unknown date	Name unknown	Merchantman		East Indies	Unknown	For private owner.
Unknown date	Name unknown	Merchantman			Great Britain	For private owner.
Unknown date	Name unknown	Paddle steamer	M. Perier	Seine	Kingdom of France	For M. Perier.
