= List of ship launches in 1766 =

The list of ship launches in 1766 includes a chronological list of some ships launched in 1766.

Date	Ship	Class	Builder	Location	Country	Notes
13 January	Aurora	Niger-class frigate	Joseph Harris	Chatham Dockyard	Great Britain	For Royal Navy.
25 March	Boudeuse	Fifth rate	Jean-Hyacinth Raffeau	Indret shipyard, Nantes	Kingdom of France	For French Navy.
26 March	Nossa Senhora de Belém	Fourth rate	Luis Isidoro	Pará	Brazil Brazil	For Portuguese Navy.
12 April	Dédaigneuse	Dedaigneuse-class frigate	Leon-Michel Guignace	Bordeaux	Kingdom of France	For French Navy.
15 May	Languedoc	Saint-Esprit-class ship of the line	Joseph-Marie-Blaise Coulomb	Toulon	Kingdom of France	For French Navy.
10 May	Lunette	Corvette	Pierre-Augustin Lamothe Kercaradec	Brest	Kingdom of France	For French Navy.
24 May	Bretagne	Ship of the line	Antoine Groignard	Brest	Kingdom of France	For French Navy.
24 May	London	London-class ship of the line	Edward Allin	Chatham Dockyard	Great Britain	For Royal Navy.
27 May	Pochtalon	Sixth rate	Ivan I. Afanaseyev	Olonetsk	Russia	For Imperial Russian Navy.
31 May	Boyne	Burford-class ship of the line		Plymouth Dockyard	Great Britain	For Royal Navy.
4 June	Sviatoi Aleksandr	Corvette	I. V. James	Saint Petersburg	Russia	For Imperial Russian Navy.
13 June	Aziia	Pyotr II-class ship of the line	I. V. James	Arkhangelsk	Russia	For Imperial Russian Navy.
26 June	Bourgogne	Third rate	Noel Pomet	Toulon	Kingdom of France	For French Navy.
16 July	Marseillais	Third rate	Joseph-Veronique-Charles Chapelle	Toulon	Kingdom of France	For French Navy.
23 August	Carysfort	Coventry-class frigate	William Gray	Sheerness Dockyard	Great Britain	For Royal Navy.
3 September	Le Marquis de Sance	East Indiaman	Gilles Cambry	Lorient	Kingdom of France	For Compagnie des Indes.
19 September	Triton	East Indiaman	Thomas West	Deptford	Great Britain	For British East India Company.
20 September	Magnificent	Ramillies-class ship of the line	Adam Hayes	Deptford Dockyard	Great Britain	For Royal Navy.
27 September	Engageante	Engageante-class frigate		Toulon	Kingdom of France	For French Navy.
18 October	San Juan Nepomuceno	Third rate	Juan Donesteve	Guarnizo	Spain	For Spanish Navy.
20 October	Blanche	Infidèle-class frigate	Jean-Joseph Ginoux	Havre de Grâce	Kingdom of France	For French Navy.
4 November	Enjouée	Infidèle-class frigate	Jean-Joseph Ginoux	Havre de Grâce	Kingdom of France	For French Navy.
18 November	Belle Poule	Dédagneuse-class frigate		Bordeaux	Kingdom of France	For French Navy.
16 December	San Pascual Bailôn	San Juan Nepomuceno-class ship of the line	Manuel de Zubiria	Guarnizo	Spain	For Spanish Navy.
Unknown date	Duc de Duras	East Indiaman	Antoine Groignard	Lorient	Kingdom of France	For French East India Company.
Unknown date	Earl of Mornington	East Indiaman		Bombay	India	For Abbott & Co.
Unknown date	Egmont	East Indiaman	John Wells	Deptford	Great Britain	For British East India Company.
Unknown date	Europa	East Indiaman	John Perry	Blackwall Yard	Great Britain	For British East India Company.
Unknown date	Greenwich	East Indiaman	John & William Wells	Deptford Dockyard	Great Britain	For British East India Company.
Unknown date	Hümay-ı Bahri	Fifth rate			Ottoman Empire	For Ottoman Navy.
Unknown date	Tamponne	Tamponne-class gabarre	Leon-Miche Guignace	Bayonne	Kingdom of France	For French Navy.
Unknown date	Le Dauphin	East Indiaman		Lorient	Kingdom of France	For Compagnie des Indes.
Unknown date	Gros Ventre	Tamponne-class gabarre	Leon-Michel Guignace	Bayonne	Kingdom of France	For French Navy.
Unknown date	Laverdy	Flûte	François Caro	Lorient	Kingdom of France	For Compagnie des Indes.
Unknown date	Mukaddeme-i Şeref	Fourth rate			Ottoman Empire	For Ottoman Navy.
Unknown date	Semend-i Bahri	Fourth rate		Rhodes	Ottoman Greece	For Ottoman Navy.
