= Joseph Marshall =

Joseph Marshall may refer to:

- Joseph Marshall (traveller) (years of birth and death are unknown), British traveler of 2nd half of the 18th century
- Joseph Marshall (cricketer, born 1835) (1835–1915), English clergyman and cricketer
- Joseph Marshall (sportsman) (1862–1913), English cricketer and footballer
- Joseph Marshall (judge) (died 1847), Irish-born judge and politician in pre-Confederation Nova Scotia
- Joseph Marshall (painter), 18th century English painter
- Kaiser Marshall (Joseph Marshall, 1899–1948), American jazz drummer
- Joe Marshall (musician) (1913–1992), jazz drummer
- Joseph M. Marshall III (born 1946), writer
- Joseph E. Marshall (born 1947), American anti-violence community activist and talk radio host
- Joseph Henry Marshall (1854–1919), farmer and political figure in Ontario, Canada
- Joe Marshall (1876–1931), outfielder in Major League Baseball
- Joseph Herbert Marshall (1851–1918), concert impresario and mayor of Leicester
- Joe Marshall (jockey) (1908–1973), British jockey
