= Sir George Home, 7th Baronet =

Royal Navy officer (1740–1803)

Vice-Admiral Sir George Home Bt
- Born: 1740
- Died: 2 May 1803 (aged 62–63); Darnhall, Cheshire
- Burial place: Greyfriars Kirkyard, Edinburgh
- Spouse: Helen Buchanan (m. 1785)
- Children: 4
- Military career
- Allegiance: United Kingdom
- Branch: Royal Navy
- Service years: c.1759–1803
- Rank: Vice-admiral
- Commands: HMS Barbadoes; HMS Rover; HMS Royal Oak; HMS Vigilant; HMS Suffolk; HMS Defiance; HMS Glory
- Conflicts: Seven Years' War; American Revolutionary War; Battle of Martinique; Battle of Cape Spartel; French Revolutionary Wars

Vice-Admiral Sir George Home, 7th Baronet (/ˈhjuːm/ HYOOM; 1740 – 2 May 1803) was a Royal Navy officer. Having first seen service during the Seven Years' War, Home was a lieutenant at the start of the American Revolutionary War. Serving on the Leeward Islands Station, he was promoted to commander in 1778 and advanced to captain in the following year. He commanded HMS Vigilant at the Battle of Martinique in 1780. Returning to Britain in 1781, Home took command of HMS Suffolk in 1782 and commanded the ship during the Channel Fleet's relief of the Great Siege of Gibraltar and the subsequent Battle of Cape Spartel that year.

Home did not have any active service in the period between the American Revolutionary and French Revolutionary Wars. In 1795 he was given command of HMS Defiance, part of the North Sea Fleet. Home's command of Defiance was an unhappy one, with the crew unsettled by the lack of shore leave and Home's frequent use of corporal punishment. They mutinied in Leith Roads on 18 October, demanding Home be replaced. Order was only regained a day later when the ship was stormed by a party of soldiers. Four mutineers were executed, and Home remained in command until 1796 when he was moved to HMS Glory. In the following year he was promoted to flag rank, and saw no further naval service before his death in 1803.

== Early life ==
George Home was born in 1740. He was the son of Sir James Home, 6th Baronet, of Blackadder House in Berwickshire, and Catherine née Livington. Home's father died on 28 March 1755, leaving Home to inherit the family baronetcy as seventh baronet.

== Military career ==
=== Early service ===
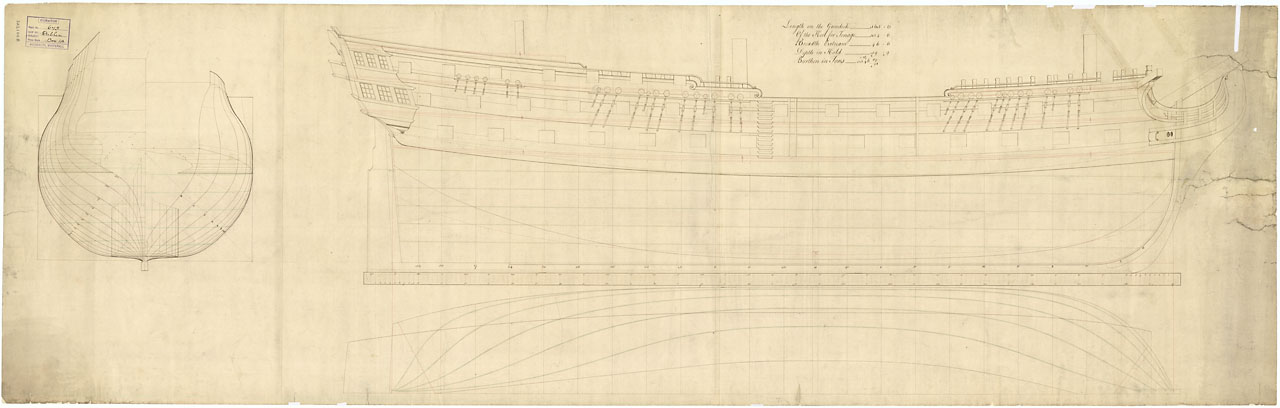
Plan of HMS Lenox, Home's first ship as a commissioned officer

Home joined the Royal Navy sometime prior to 1759, seeing service during the Seven Years' War. He was promoted to lieutenant on 23 November that year, joining the 74-gun ship of the line HMS Lenox. The ship served on the East Indies Station as the flagship of Rear-Admiral Samuel Cornish. Home was moved from Lenox to the 60-gun ship of the line HMS Medway, also in the East Indies, on 8 June 1761. He left Medway on 27 October and departed the East Indies, moving to become lieutenant of the 24-gun frigate HMS Arundel which was on the Leeward Islands Station.

Home returned to Britain in 1762, joining the brand new 50-gun fourth-rate HMS Romney on 8 July. He was moved to the 32-gun frigate HMS Pearl on 25 March 1763, serving as her first lieutenant. Home moved to fill the same position in the 28-gun frigate HMS Boreas on 19 April, serving off North Foreland. He left Boreas on 28 December the same year, and embarked on a period of half pay.

Home returned to active service with the Royal Navy on 7 April 1767, joining the 74-gun ship of the line HMS Ramillies which was a guardship at Sheerness Dockyard. He remained there until 10 April 1770, and then on 21 September instead joined the 74-gun ship of the line HMS Albion. This new ship had been commissioned in response to the Falklands Crisis of 1770. After this ended in the same year, Albion became guardship at Portsmouth Dockyard and then, from October 1771, Plymouth Dockyard. Home left Albion on 20 September 1773.

=== American Revolutionary War ===
With the American Revolutionary War underway, Home next saw active service when he was sent to the 74-gun ship of the line HMS Prince of Wales on 4 November 1776. The ship spent the initial part of the war serving off the British coast. Home was advanced to become the first lieutenant of Prince of Wales on 5 May 1778, and two weeks later the ship sailed to join the Leeward Islands Station as flagship of Rear-Admiral Samuel Barrington.

Barrington promoted Home to commander on 1 August and gave him his first command, the 14-gun sloop HMS Barbadoes. The ship had been purchased by Barrington to bolster his forces at Tobago. Taking fifty men with him from Prince of Wales to form Barbadoes's first crew, Home sailed to Tobago. There he joined with the 16-gun sloop HMS Snake, working to protect the island and its merchant community. On 15 December Barrington defeated a French fleet at the Battle of St. Lucia, looking to invade the island and defend his fleet of transport ships. Barbadoes, Snake, and the 16-gun brig-sloop HMS Pelican escorted more transports to St Lucia on 17 December. While the French fleet remained in sight, Home was given command of the boats assigned to row guard that night, fulfilling that role again on 22 December.

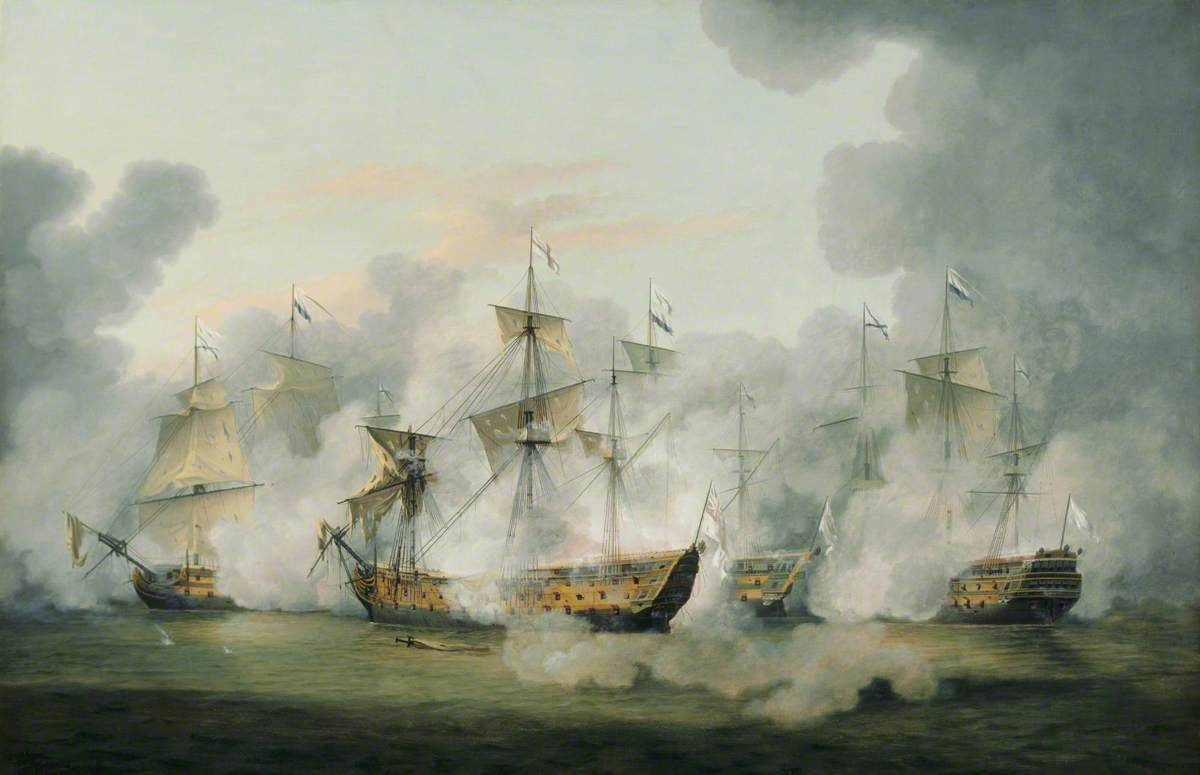
A scene from the Battle of Martinique, in which Home commanded HMS Vigilant

Home continued in command of Barbadoes until 9 April 1779, when he was moved to the command of the 16-gun sloop HMS Rover, a captured American privateer. Home's tenure with Rover was brief, as on 21 July he was promoted to captain and given command of the 74-gun ship of the line HMS Royal Oak. He was then transferred to the 64-gun ship of the line HMS Vigilant on 27 August the same year, remaining in the Leeward Islands. In command of Vigilant, Home fought at the inconclusive Battle of Martinique on 17 April 1780. Vigilant was the last ship of the centre squadron of the British line of battle as it faced the French fleet, and had two men wounded during the engagement. The ship was subsequently present at two further brushes between the British and French fleets, on 15 and 17 May. After the Capture of Sint Eustatius in February 1781, Home was given command of the escort to the convoy taking the surrendered governor, Johannes de Graaff, to Britain. The ships departed the Leeward Islands on 4 May and de Graaff arrived on 23 June. Home subsequently returned to Britain in Vigilant, paying her off in September. He left the ship on 18 January 1782.

Home spent a brief period without a command before on 7 June he was given the 74-gun ship of the line HMS Suffolk, which was recommissioned at Plymouth. In July the ship joined a squadron patrolling the Bay of Biscay, which captured three ships that month and subsequently operated off the Irish coast. At some point during this period Home briefly ceded command of Suffolk to Captain John Duckworth, but he had returned to the ship by 11 September when the squadron sailed with the Channel Fleet from Spithead to relieve the Great Siege of Gibraltar. The fleet was unopposed, weather having scattered the Franco-Spanish blockading fleet, and the ships reached Gibraltar on 13 October. The British left Gibraltar on 19 October and on the following day met the Franco-Spanish fleet in the Battle of Cape Spartel, an inconclusive and long-range engagement in which the British prioritised returning home over fighting. Home subsequently sailed Suffolk to join the West Indies Station, but relinquished command on 31 December, prior to the end of the war.

=== French Revolutionary Wars ===
Home remained on half pay with the navy until after the French Revolutionary Wars had begun. He received his first command in the conflict on 17 June 1795 when he was sent to the 74-gun ship of the line HMS Defiance, which was serving in the North Sea Fleet. Having not commanded a ship for twelve years, his appointment came about because of connections with the fleet commander, Admiral Adam Duncan. Enthusiastic, Home quickly went down to the Nore to take command of Defiance.

On 18 October Defiance was anchored in Leith Roads, with Home on shore. The crew was unhappy, and began that day by rolling round shot along the decks to show their displeasure, and then went further, seizing control of Defiance. Their complaints were that they were not being given enough shore leave, that their rum ration was being excessively watered down, and that the officers beat them with canes. They demanded that Home, who frequently flogged his men, be replaced. The crew manoeuvred Defiance's forward-facing guns to point aft at the ship's officers, constructing a barricade out of hammocks to defend themselves.

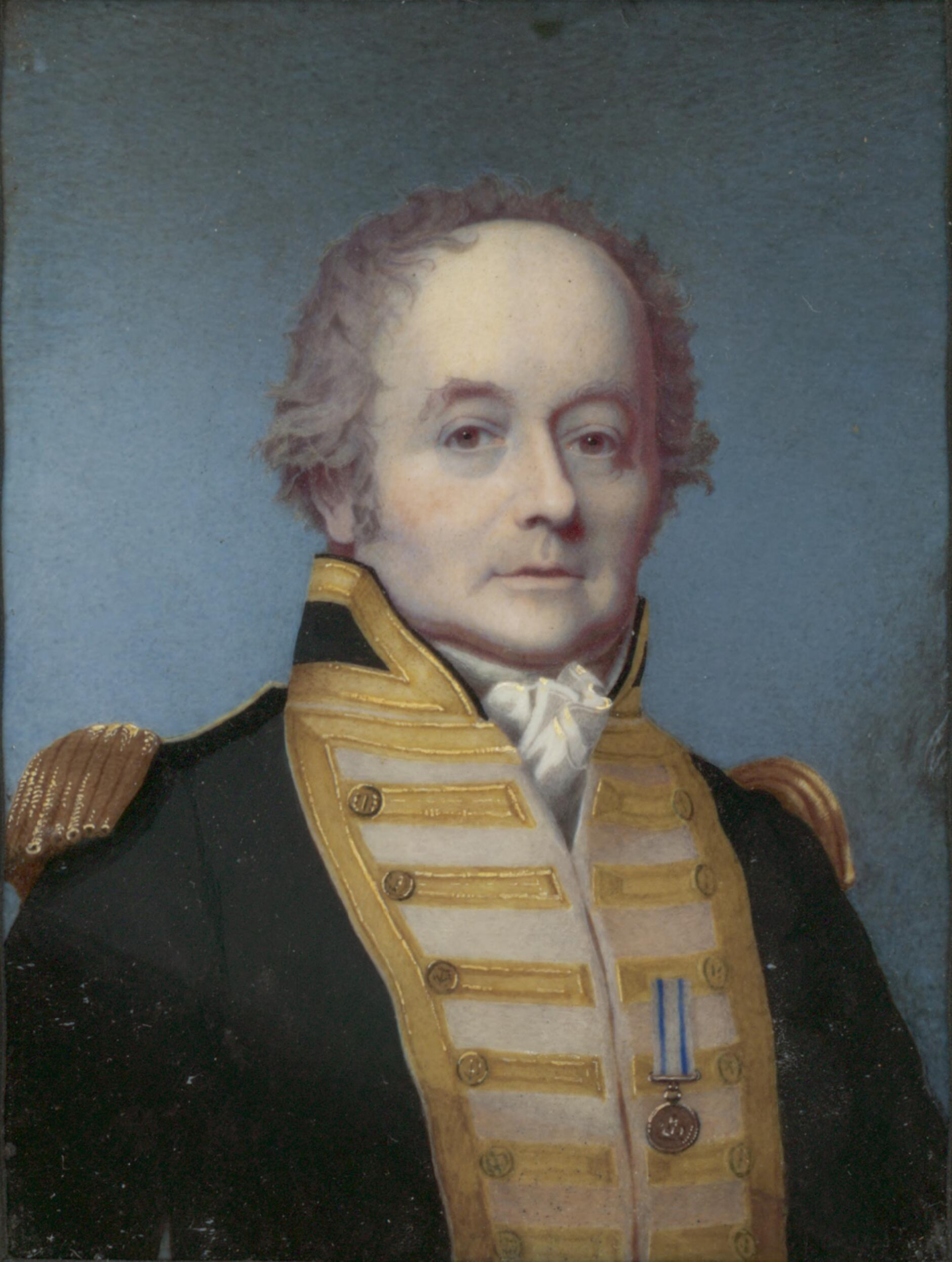
William Bligh regained control of Home's mutinous ship

Home learned of the mutiny and went to go on board, bringing with him a party of armed men from the 64-gun ship of the line HMS Asia. Home's crew allowed him to board Defiance, but stopped Asia's men from coming with him, firing their muskets through gunports to deter them. The crew provided Home with a letter explaining their grievances, claiming that they were otherwise a "dutiful ship's company upon honourable terms". The mutiny calmed, and with the assistance of other officers Home was able to arrest eight of the mutiny leaders. In the night the crew rose again to release the prisoners; Home had no marines on board to support him, and so gave in and released the men, the crew cheering him as he did so.

With dialogue and an attempt to trick the mutineers into allowing marines on board having failed, on 19 October boats with eighty soldiers, led by Captain William Bligh, forcefully boarded the ship while the mutineers unsuccessfully attempted to stop them by throwing round shot down to destroy the boats. Home was reinstated in command. That night the crew threw an anonymous letter addressed to him onto the quarterdeck, stating "Send all the soldiers out of the ship and the Royalists and we will return cheerfully to our duty". Home investigated the letter and arrested a seaman for writing it.

In total seventeen mutineers were arrested, and Defiance sailed to London for the court-martials, with a contingent of the 134th Regiment of Foot on board to keep the peace. On 8 March 1796, the day of punishment, many of the sentences handed down to the crew were lessened or quashed. Eventually four men were hanged, four reprieved, and nine flogged. The executions were completed on board Defiance, anchored at Sheerness.

On 22 March Home was transferred to the 98-gun ship of the line HMS Glory, serving in the English Channel. Glory was Home's last ship command, as on 20 February 1797 he was promoted to rear-admiral. He relinquished command of Glory four days later. As a flag officer Home received no further employment within the Royal Navy. He continued to be promoted by seniority, advancing to vice-admiral on 29 April 1802. He died at Darnhall, in Cheshire, on 2 May 1803, and was subsequently buried at Greyfriars Kirkyard in Edinburgh.

== Personal life ==
Home married Helen Buchanan (died 1824) on 13 September 1785; they had two sons and two daughters, of which the younger son James survived to inherit Home's baronetcy:

- George Home
- Catherine Home
- Sir James Home, 8th Baronet (1790–1836)
- Helen Home (1795–1858)
