= Israel Pownoll =

English shipwright (1710–1779)

Israel Pownoll (c. 1710 – April 1779) was an English shipwright who worked for the Royal Navy.

== History ==
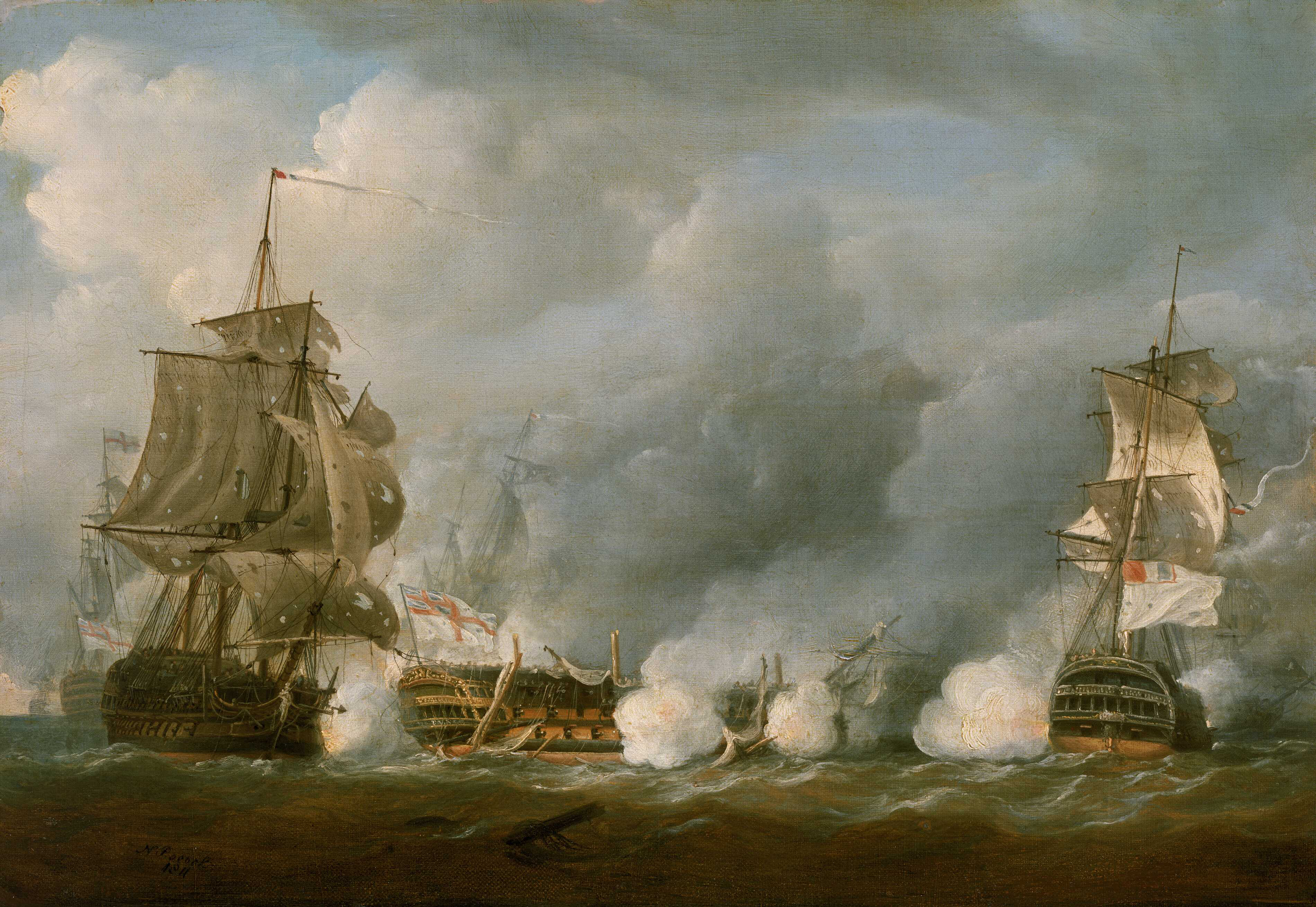
HMS Defence at battle

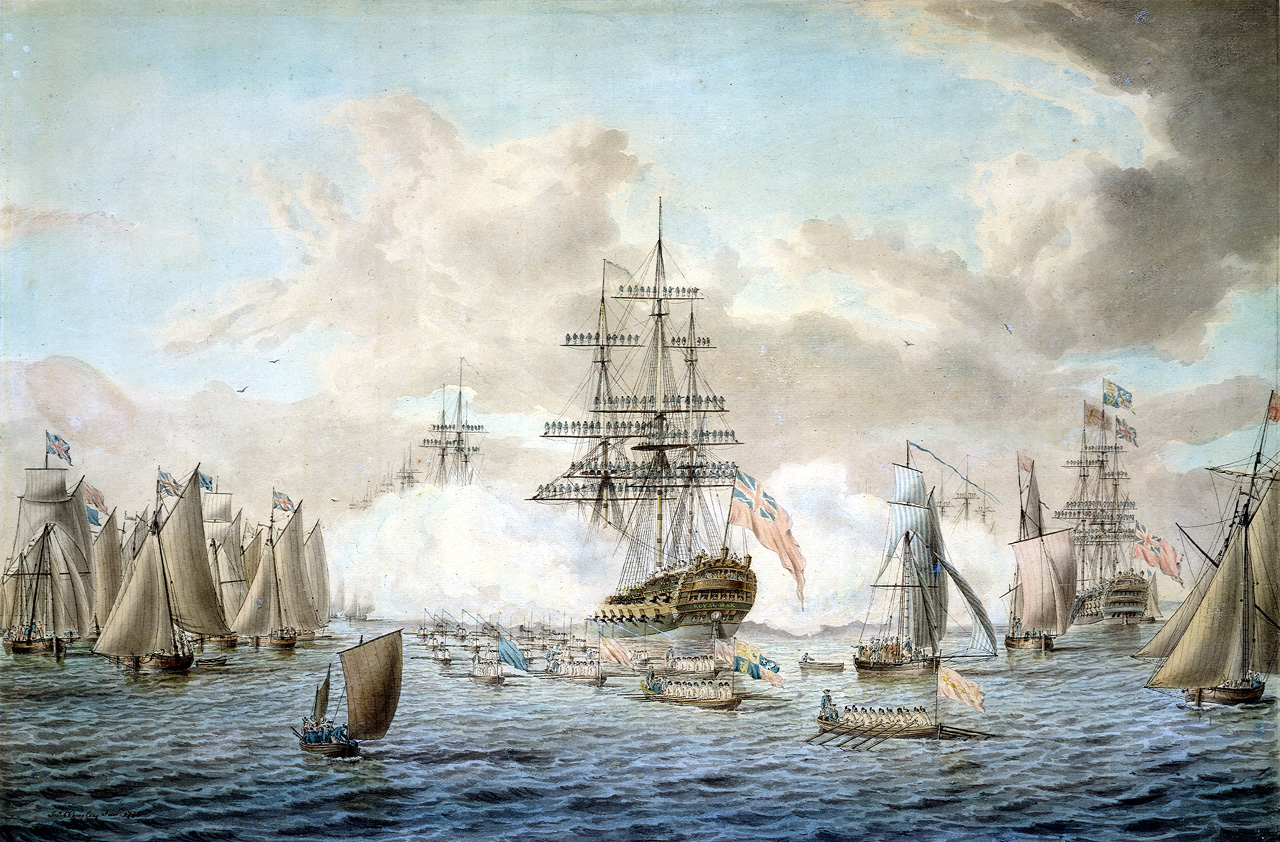
HMS Royal Oak in the Naval Review at Spithead

In 1741, he was Foreman and Master Mastmaker of Deptford Dockyard. In March 1743 he was appointed Master Caulker.

In 1752 he moved to Portsmouth Dockyard as Assistant Shipwright but was only briefly there before moving to the same role at Chatham Dockyard. In May 1755 he became Master Shipwright at Sheerness and in December 1755 moved to Woolwich Dockyard and from then the Navy lists his works. In May 1772 he took over Plymouth Dockyard and in February 1775 became Master of the Navy's main yard at Chatham Dockyard.

He died at Chatham in April 1779. His will was read on 8 May and is now held at the National Archive at Kew.

== Ships built ==
- HMS Plymouth (1755) 8-gun yacht launched at Plymouth Dockyard
- HMS Coventry (1757) launched at Chatham
- HMS Princess Amelia (1757) 80-gun ship of the line launched at Woolwich
- HMS Boreas (1757) 28-gun frigate launched at Woolwich
- HMS Rippon (1758) 60-gun ship of the line launched at Woolwich
- HMS Blenheim (1761) 90-gun ship of the line launched at Woolwich
- HMS Defence (1763) 74-gun ship of the line launched at Plymouth Dockyard
- HMS Boyne (1766) 70-gun Burford-class ship of the line, initially built by master shipwright Thomas Bucknall at Plymouth. Bucknall died in 1762 and was succeeded by Pownoll.
- HMS Swan (1767) 14-gun sloop launched at Plymouth with a figurehead
- HMS Royal Oak (1769) 74-gun ship of the line launched at Plymouth
- HMS Monmouth (1772) 64-gun ship of the line launched at Plymouth
- HMS Conqueror (1773) 74-gun ship of the line launched at Plymouth
- HMS Nonsuch (1774) 64-gun ship of the line launched at Plymouth
- HMS Camilla (1775) 20-gun ship launched at Chatham
- HMS Stirling Castle (1775) launched at Chatham
- HMS Nymph (1778) 14-gun sloop launched at Chatham

== Family ==
He was married to Mary Robarts on 15 Aug 1747. He was the uncle of Captain Philemon Pownoll.
