= HMS Sultan (1775) =

British Royal Oak-class ship of the line

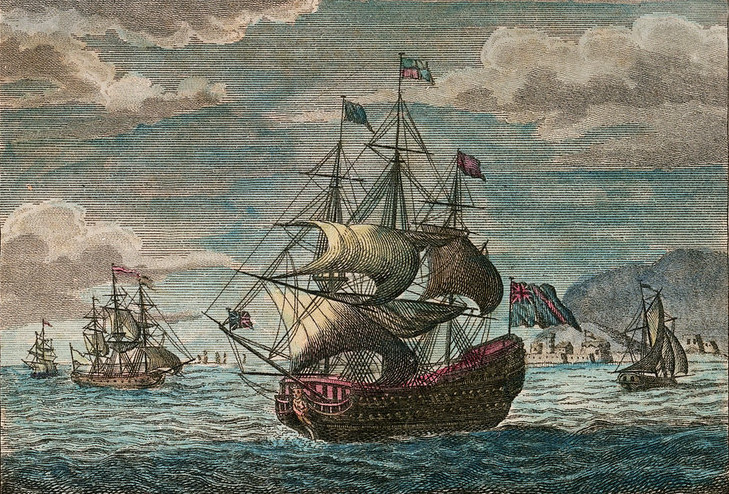
- Contemporary engraving of a Royal Oak-class ship, similar to Sultan

History

Great Britain
- Name: HMS Sultan
- Ordered: 14 January 1771
- Builder: Barnard, Harwich
- Laid down: March 1771
- Launched: 23 December 1775
- Renamed: Suffolk (25 October 1805)
- Fate: Broken up, 1816
- Notes: Participated in: Battle of Grenada (1779); Battle of Providien (1782); Battle of Negapatam (1782); Battle of Trincomalee (1782); Battle of Cuddalore (1783)

General characteristics
- Class & type: Royal Oak-class ship of the line
- Tons burthen: 1614 73/94 (bm)
- Length: 168 ft 6 in (51.36 m) (gundeck)
- Beam: 46 ft 11 in (14.30 m)
- Depth of hold: 20 ft (6.1 m)
- Propulsion: Sails
- Sail plan: Full-rigged ship
- Complement: 600
- Armament: 74 guns: Gundeck: 28 × 32 pdrs; Upper gundeck: 28 × 18 pdrs; Quarterdeck: 14 × 9 pdrs; Forecastle: 4 × 9 pdrs

HMS Sultan was a 74-gun third rate ship of the line of the Royal Navy, launched on 23 December 1775 at Harwich. Built to take part in the American Revolutionary War, her departure was delayed due to a shortage of crew and it was 9 June 1778 before she finally sailed as part of a squadron led by Rear-Admiral John Byron. In September she was with Richard Howe's fleet, blockading the French in Boston and in 1779, transferred to the West Indies, where she took part in the Battle of Grenada that July. Almost a year later, on 20 June 1780, she was involved in a short action off the coast of the Dominican Republic with a superior French force.

Following a refit at Plymouth, Sultan was sent to join Sir Edward Hughes' fleet in the East Indies, arriving from England on 30 March in time to fight in the battles of Providien, Negapatam and Trincomalee. Her last action was at Cuddalore in 1783 and she returned to England in 1784 as Hughes' flagship.

In July 1794, Sultan was recommissioned as a hospital ship in Portsmouth harbour where, in January 1797, she was converted for use as a prison ship. Renamed Suffolk on 25 October 1805, she remained a prison ship until 1815 when she was laid up in ordinary and in 1816, broken up.

== Construction ==
When John Montagu, Earl of Sandwich, began his third term as First Lord of the Admiralty, he immediately ordered seven new third-rate ships. Three 74s, of which Sultan was to be the first, were to be built under contract to a 1765 design of the renowned shipwright, Sir John Williams. These Royal Oak-Class ships differed from the designs of Sir Thomas Slade in that they had blunter bows and sharper sterns. This made them better sailers in fine to moderate conditions but they did not handle well in strong winds and suffered from instability.

Sultan was ordered on 14 January 1771 and her keel was laid down in March at Harwich Dockyard. As built, her dimensions were: 168 feet 6 inches (51.4 metres) along the gun deck, 137 ft 11 in (42.0 m) at the keel, with a beam of 46 ft 11 in (14.3 m) and a depth in the hold of 20 ft 0 in (6.10 m). This made her 1,614 73/94 tons burthen (bm). Her build cost the Admiralty £33,621.9.1d plus a further £5,855.9.6d for finishing.

On her lower gun deck, Sultan carried twenty-eight 32-pounder (15 kg) guns. Her upper deck had twenty-eight 18 pounders (8.2 kg). There were four 9-pounder (4.1 kg) guns on the forecastle and fourteen 9 pounders (4.1 kg) on the quarterdeck. Royal Oak-Class ships were designed to carry a complement of 600 when fully manned.

== Service ==
Sultan was launched on 23 December 1775, an event celebrated at the Three Cups, Harwich. She was taken to Chatham Dockyard where she was completed between 23 February 1776 and 3 November 1777. First commissioned under Captain John Wheelock in August 1777, she was part of a fleet that sailed for New York on 9 June the following year. Comprising 13 ships-of-the-line and a frigate, these reinforcements for the war in America, under the command of Rear-Admiral John Byron, had been delayed for some months due to a shortage of manpower. It was only after the French fleet had left Toulon and thus ceased to pose an invasion threat, that the Channel Fleet could be stripped of its crews.

Byron's squadron was scattered by a storm and arrived in America piecemeal. His flagship, the 90-gun HMS Princess Royal, eventually made landfall off the south-coast of Long Island on 18 August. Most of his ships ended up in Halifax and only a few made it to New York. On 11 September 1778, Sultan joined Richard Howe's fleet, blockading the French in Boston.

Following the death of Captain Wheelock in 1779, command of Sultan passed to Captain Charles Fielding. The ship was in Antigua in February when Fielding was entrusted with delivering dispatches to England. Shortly after the Battle of St Lucia, the frigate HMS Pearl arrived, carrying details of the island's capture and the two ships left in company on 16 February. They arrived at Spithead on 22 March with papers and reports from Byron, Admiral Samuel Barrington and Major-General James Grant.

=== Battle of Grenada ===
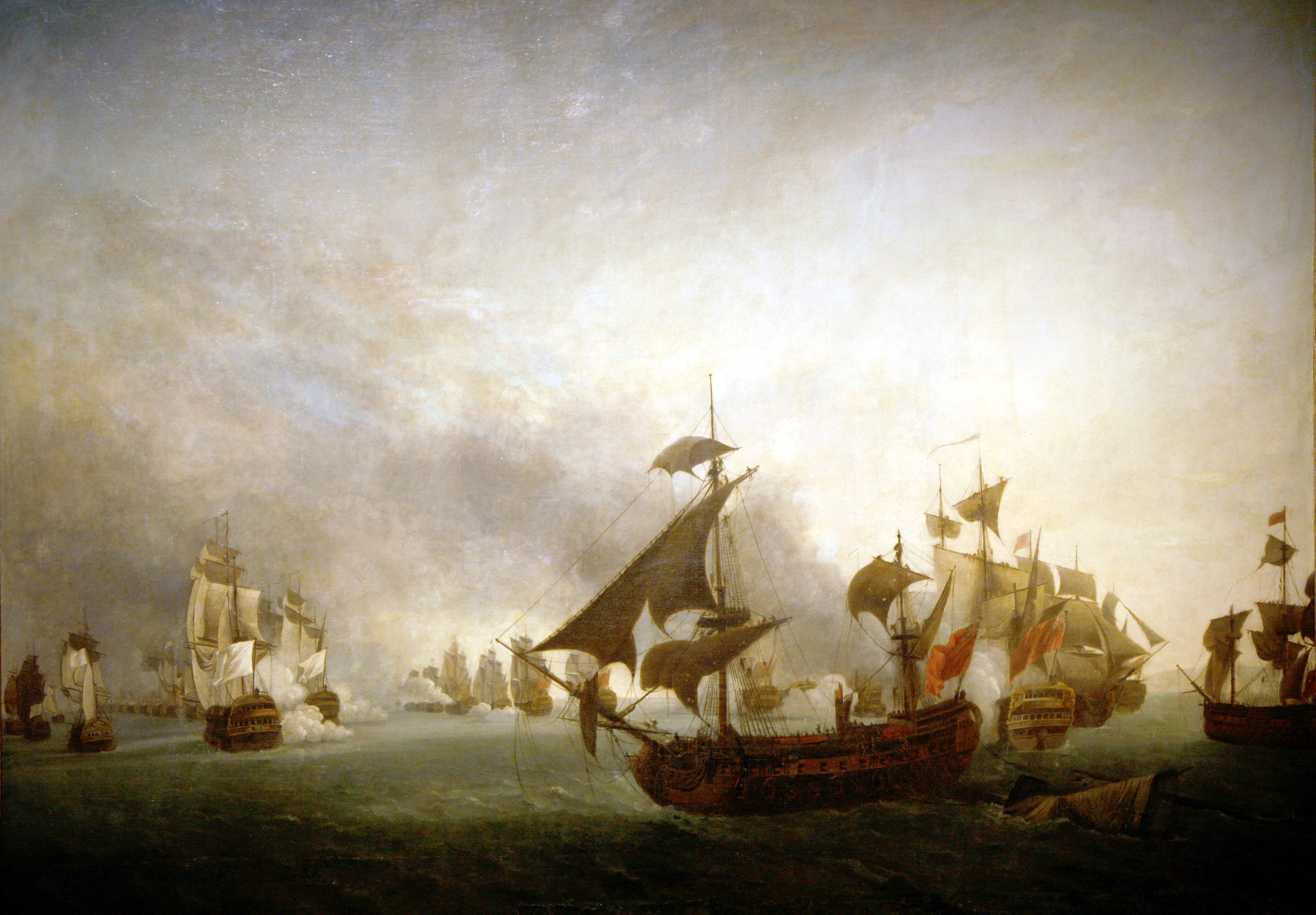
Jean-François Hue's depiction of the Battle of Grenada

Fielding was later replaced by Captain Alan Gardner under whom Sultan fought at the Battle of Grenada on 6 July. The British ships were away on escort duty, when on 18 June, a French force under the Comte D'Estaing, attacked and captured the island of St Vincent. Admiral Byron had been notified of the island's loss and was moving to recapture it when he received word that the French had since taken Grenada. He immediately turned his convoy to meet them. Of his twenty-one ships-of-the-line, he initially left three to guard the convoy and, hoping to attack quickly before the French had time to assemble, sent the remainder on a general chase of the enemy fleet as it left its anchorage. Fifteen of the twenty-five French ships had already formed line-of-battle when Sultan, leading the charge, with HMS Prince of Wales and HMS Boyne arrived. Far ahead of their compatriots they were forced to endure the brunt of the French fire, without being able to bring their own guns to bear. The rest of the British fleet, while attempting to form line, engaged discontinuously and, outnumbered, was badly mauled in the disorganised attack. The British had 183 men killed and 346 wounded in the battle. The loss aboard Sultan was 16 killed and 39 wounded.

=== Action off Monte Cristi ===
In June 1780, Sultan was part of William Cornwallis's small squadron, comprising two 74s, two 64s, a 50-gun ship and a frigate, sent by the Commander-in-Chief of the Jamaica Station, Admiral Hyde Parker, to accompany a British merchant fleet bound for England. Having taken the convoy as far as Bermuda, Cornwallis was returning when, on 20 June, a fleet of French transports and its escort were seen off Monte Cristi. The French fleet, commanded by Admiral Charles de Ternay was on its way to Rhode Island with 6,000 troops. On seeing the British approach, de Ternay had his seven escort ships – An 80-gun, two 74s and four 64s, form a column which then bore down on the enemy. In response Cornwallis ordered his ships into a line-of-battle, with Sultan in second position. After a brief exchange of fire, the inferior British force broke off the engagement and the French continued on their way.

By December that year Sultan was back in England undergoing a refit and recoppering at Plymouth. The works took until April following and cost £11,914.2.10d. She was recommissioned in May 1781, under Captain James Watt, and in June, sailed for the East Indies. In 1782, having at some point returned to home waters, Sultan and Magnanime were sent back to the East Indies to join Sir Edward Hughes' fleet, arriving from England in time to fight in the battles of Providien, Negapatam and Trincomalee. During the journey, scurvy had taken its toll on the men from both ships. Encountering Hughes en route to Trincomalee, neither ship had an opportunity to land the sick and reinforce, and were thus forced to do battle with depleted crews.

=== Providien ===
Hughes in the 74-gun Superb, accompanied by the 74-gun Hero, the 68-gun Monarca, the 50-gun Isis, and the five 64-gun ships, Exeter, Burford, Monmouth, Worcester and Eagle, had left Madras on 12 March and was sailing with reinforcements for Trincomalee. On 30 March, he was joined at sea by Sultan and Magnanime, bringing his force up to eleven ships. Twelve French ships-of-the-line, under Admiral Pierre André de Suffren, having landed troops to assist in the siege of Cuddalore, was heading south when on 9 April the British fleet was seen. Hughes, considering his first priority to be the safe delivery of the troops, held his course for two days until an action became inevitable. When, on the morning of 12 April, it became apparent that he was going to be overhauled, Hughes had his ships form line-of-battle with Sultan and Magnanime at the rear.

At 11:00, the French, having been on a parallel tack, turned towards the British line with each ship steering for its opposite number. Suffren directed his extra ship to attack the rear from the other side. The French line was bowed however and it was the central British ships which bore the brunt of the attack. At 15:40, both fleets were running out of searoom and tacked to avoid running foul of the shore. After working his way clear, at 17:40 Hughes anchored his fleet to make repairs. The French anchored at 20:00, 2 nautical miles (3.7 km) away, to do likewise. Each side had had 137 men killed and, in addition, the British had 430 wounded and the French, 357. It was a week before either fleet was ready to sail again; the French finished their repairs first and left on 19 April, the British a few days later. Hughes' ships put into Trincomalee on 22 April. On 23 June, they left for Negapatam.

=== Negapatam ===
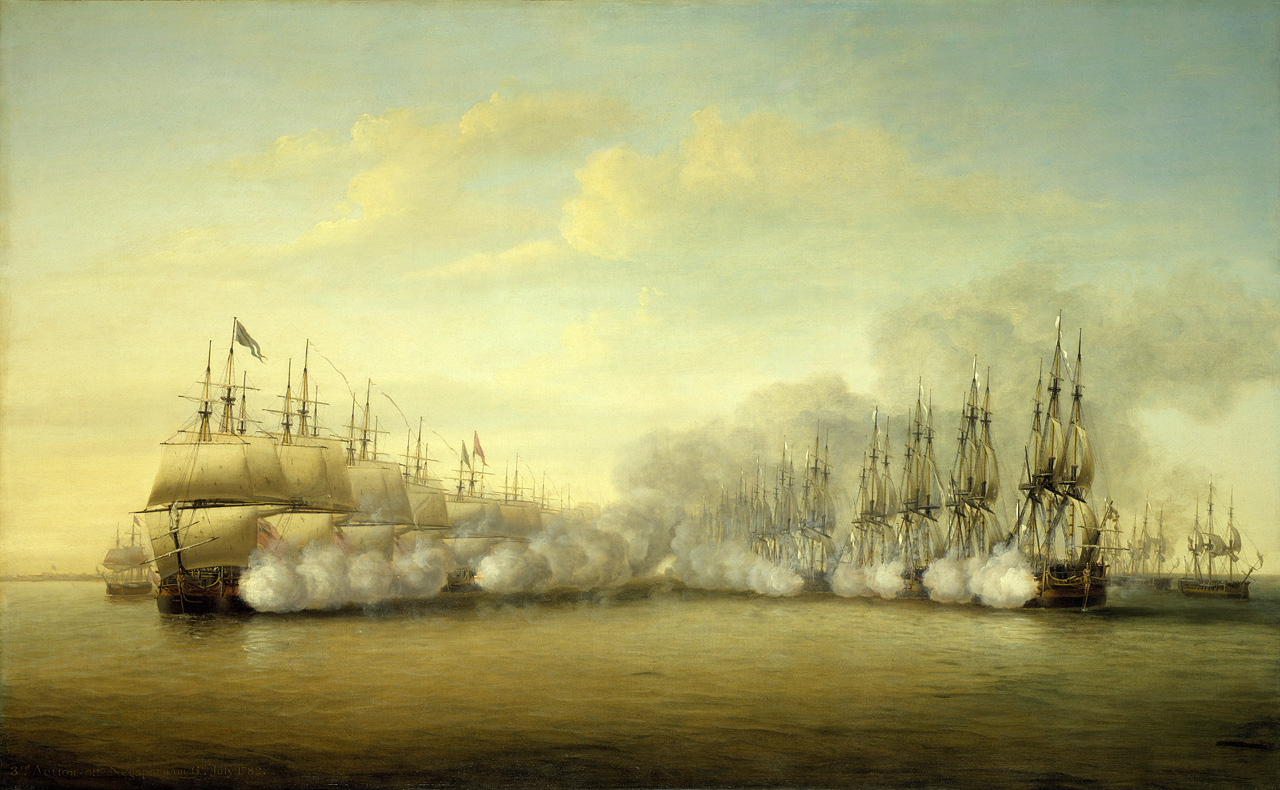
The French and British fleets lined up on the same tack, at the start of the Battle of Negapatam. As envisaged by Dominic Serres

On arrival at Negapatam, the fleet learned that Cuddalore had surrendered on 4 April, and Suffren was a few miles north preying on British merchant vessels. While the British were deciding their best course of action, Suffren, who had heard of Hughes' location, turned up to offer battle. The French fleet, reinforced with its prizes, appeared at 13:00 on 5 July and at 15:00, with a monsoon approaching, Hughes' ships sailed out, heading south, to steal the weathergauge. When dawn came the following morning, the British were some 8 nmi (15 km) to windward of the French fleet, which had anchored during the night. At 06:00, Suffren ordered his ships to get under way but found that one of his 64s, Ajax, was unable to comply, having lost a mast during the previous night's storm. This made the fleets numerically equal.

With the wind from the south-west, both fleets lined up on the starboard tack with the French to leeward. Just before 11:00 the lines began to converge but as in the battle on 12 April, and indeed as was the case in most engagements, the opposing forces did not sail a parallel course and the ships in the van began a much closer action than those towards the rear. The fourth ship in the French line therefore was badly damaged in the opening exchanges and, with one of its masts brought down, was forced to retire.

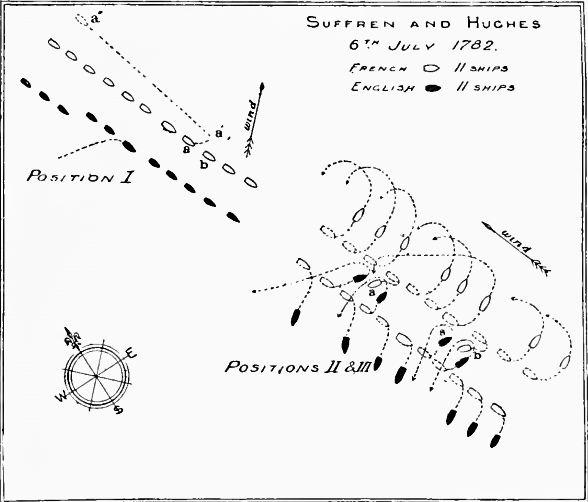
Effect on belligerents of the dramatic wind shift at 12:30

At 12:30, the wind veered to south-south-east, sending the fleets into disarray. With the wind head-on, some ships turned to starboard and some to port. The majority turned away from the engagement but six ships, four British and two French turned in towards one another. Sultan, one of the ships in the ensuing melee, may have been responsible for bringing down the mast of Brilliant before joining two other British ships in an action against the 64-gun Sévère. Outnumbered, Sévère surrendered. The British ships ceased firing and Sultan turned away to rejoin her fleet. With Suffren now approaching in the 74-gun Héros, Sévère ran up her colours and fired into Sultan's stern, causing considerable damage. By 13:30 the battle was all but over; each side regrouped and by 18:00 had anchored some 10 nmi (19 km) apart, to effect repairs. The British had 77 killed and 233 wounded in the engagement while the French had 178 killed and 601 wounded. On 7 July, the French fleet sailed for Cuddalore.

=== Trincomalee ===
Hughes had returned to Madras by 20 July but having anticipated an attack on Trincomalee, left on 20 August. The British reached the port on 2 September to find the place had fallen two days earlier. The next morning, as the British approached, Suffren's force of 14 ships-of-the-line, put to sea. Hughes had also been reinforced, by the 64-gun Sceptre, bringing his number up to twelve.

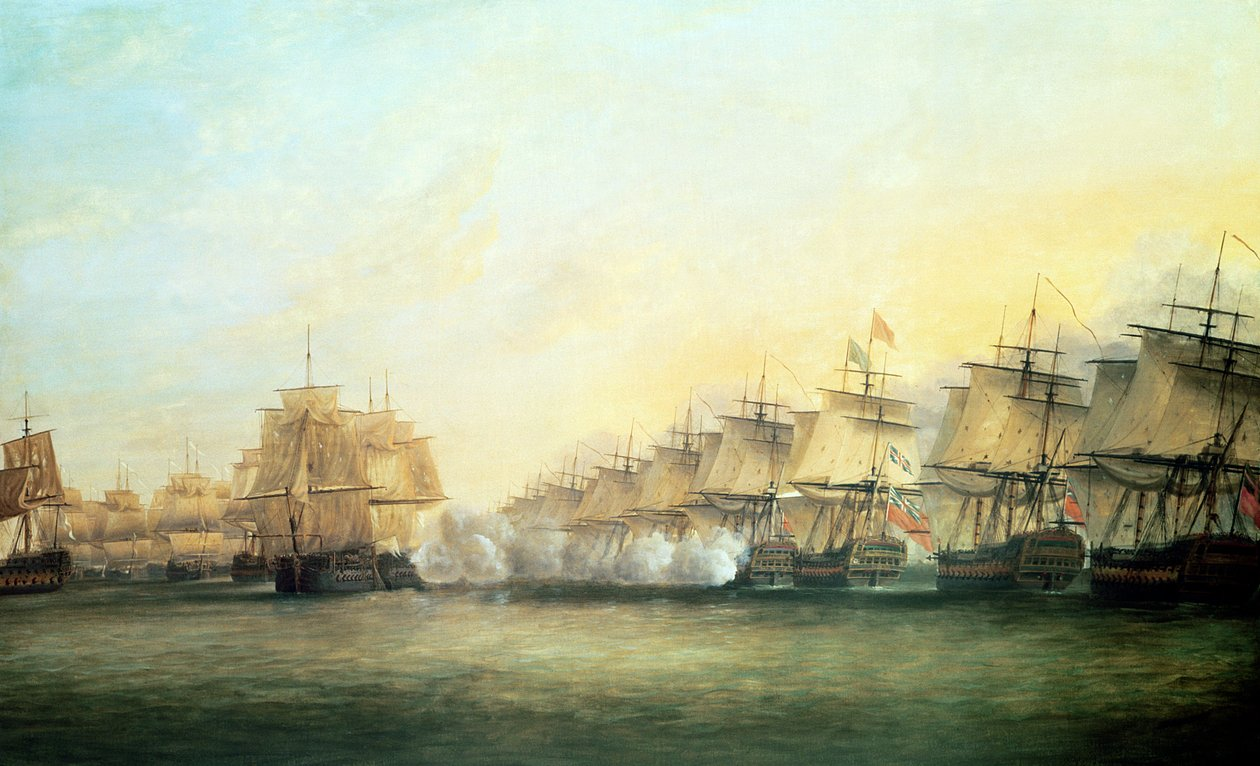
Battle of Trincomalee, painted for Hughes by Dominic Serres

By the time the French were in a position to attack, the fleets were 25 nmi (46 km) to the south-east. At 14:00, having come down on the British, line abreast, Suffren had his ships form line ahead and at 14:30, action ensued. Having poorly executed the manoeuvres, the French attack was disjointed. with a distant engagement occurring at the front and rear of the line. Towards the centre however, a heavy close-action took place, initially with Sultan, Superb, Burford, Eagle, Hero and Monarca against Héros, Illustre and Ajax. By the time Brillant and Artésien arrived in support of their French comrades, Ajax had been so badly damaged, she was forced to withdraw. At 17:30 the wind changed, allowing the French van to engage. The British ships at the centre, now outnumbered by a fresh enemy force, received heavy fire. The battle finished when it became too dark to continue. Both sides remained in the vicinity until the following morning when the French sailed for Trincomalee, and the British for Madras. At the end of the fight, the British were left with 51 dead and 283 wounded, the French 82 dead and 255 wounded. Watt was one of those killed at Trincomalee. He was replaced by Captain Andrew Mitchell who commanded Sultan at the Battle of Cuddalore on 20 June 1783.

The condition of the British fleet, following the Battle of Trincomalee, was such that Hughes did not think it would survive the monsoon in the open waters around Madras. After repairs and revictualing therefore, he moved his ships to Bombay. It was 15 November before the fleet was ready to leave and the journey took upwards of two months, during which time Hughes moved his flag to Sultan. In April 1783, Hughes' ships were sent in support of a land-based attack on Cuddalore.

=== Cuddalore ===
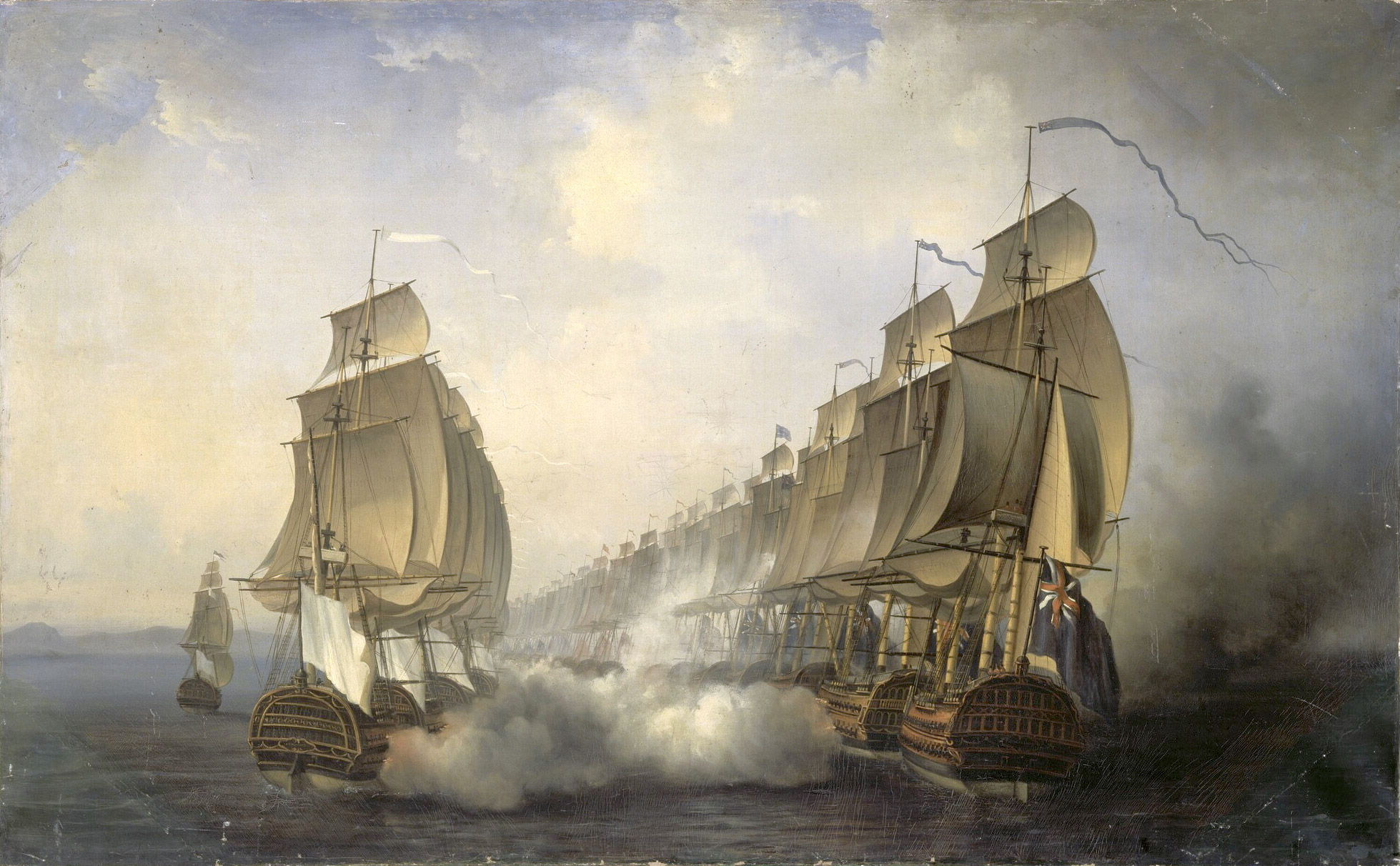
A depiction of the Battle of Cuddalore by French artist, Auguste Jugelet (1805–1875)

A British force marched from Madras and laid siege to Cuddalore on 7 June 1783. Hughes fleet of 18 ships-of-the-line, cruised to the south and covered the transports as they landed supplies. On hearing of the attack, on 10 June, Suffren set sail from Trincomalee with 15 ships-of-the-line and on 13 June, discovered the British fleet at anchor off Parangipettai. On seeing the French, Hughes had his ships get under way and set about trying to obtain the weathergauge in the light and variable wind. Suffren, battling the same conditions, spent the next four days getting to Cuddalore, where he supplemented his crews with 1,200 French troops before leaving on 18 June.

A steady wind on 20 June allowed the opposing fleets to engage. Both fleets formed a line on the port tack, heading north. At about 16:15 they opened fire. Sultan, fourth in the line, attacked the 74-gun Argonaute, opposite. The battle continued for three hours, during which time the British losses were 99 dead and 434 wounded and the French, 182 dead and 386 wounded. When darkness fell, the British hove-to while the French fleet continued on the same tack, anchoring the next morning, 25 nmi (46 km) north of the city.

In addition to the dead and wounded, Hughes had lost 1,100 men to scurvy. With crews depleted and several ships disabled, the British retreated to Madras on 22 June, arriving three days later. The siege continued without them until 29 June when a British ship brought news of peace.

== Fate ==
After Sultan returned home in 1784 as Hughes' flagship, she was paid off. In July 1794, Sultan was recommissioned as a hospital ship in Portsmouth Harbour; still there in January 1797, she was converted for use as a prison ship at a cost of £4,070 (equivalent to £423,134 in 2023). Renamed Suffolk on 25 October 1805, she remained a prison ship until 1815 when she was laid up in ordinary. She was broken up in 1816.
