= HMS Royal Oak (1769) =

Royal Oak-class ship of the line

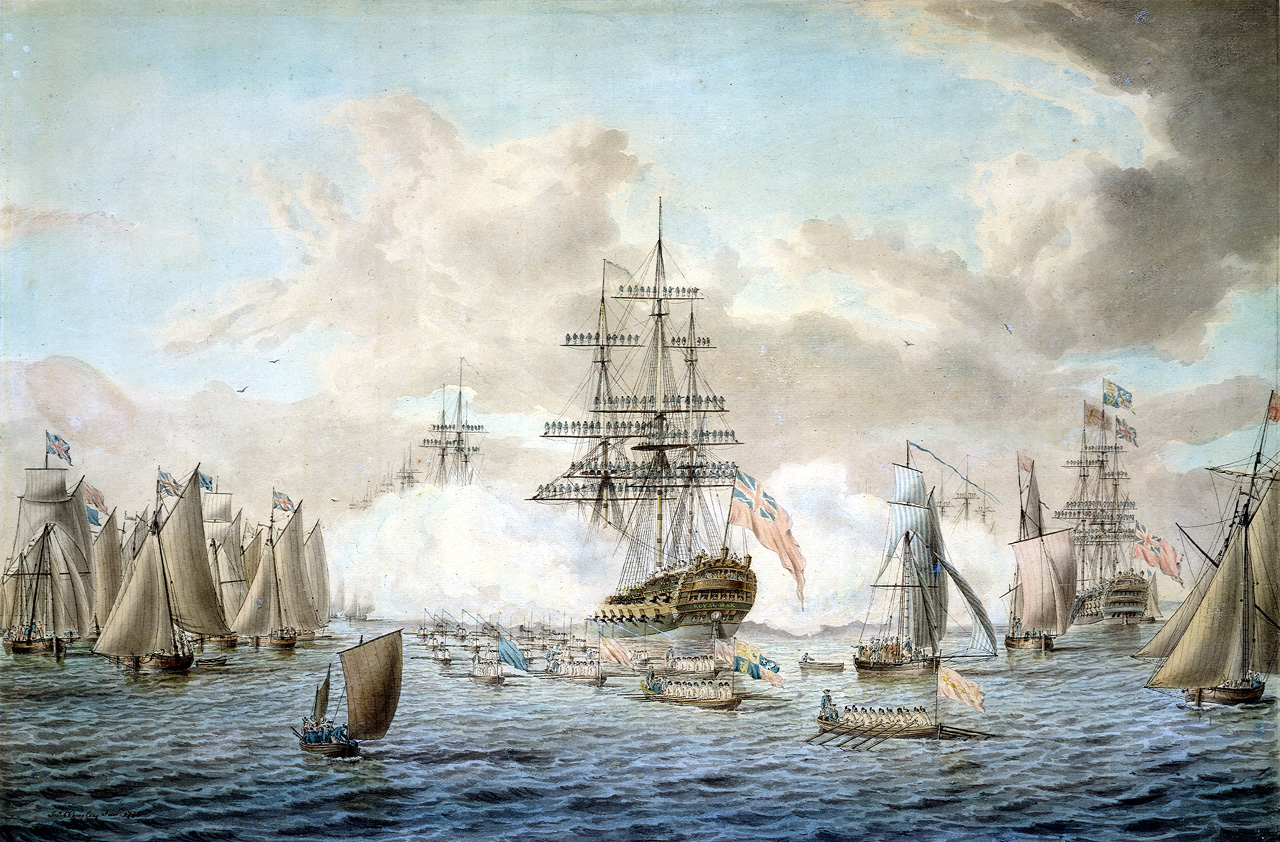
- George III reviewing the Fleet at Spithead, 22 June 1773, depicting HMS 'Royal Oak'

History

Great Britain
- Name: HMS Royal Oak
- Namesake: Royal Oak
- Ordered: 16 November 1765
- Builder: Plymouth Dockyard
- Laid down: May 1766
- Launched: 13 November 1769
- Fate: Broken up, 1815
- Notes: Participated in: Battle of the Chesapeake

General characteristics
- Class & type: Royal Oak-class ship of the line
- Tons burthen: 1606 21/94 (bm)
- Length: 168 ft 6 in (51.36 m) (gundeck)
- Beam: 46 ft 9 in (14.25 m)
- Depth of hold: 20 ft (6.1 m)
- Propulsion: Sails
- Sail plan: Full-rigged ship
- Armament: 74 guns: Gundeck: 28 × 32 pdrs; Upper gundeck: 28 × 18 pdrs; Quarterdeck: 14 × 9 pdrs; Forecastle: 4 × 9 pdrs

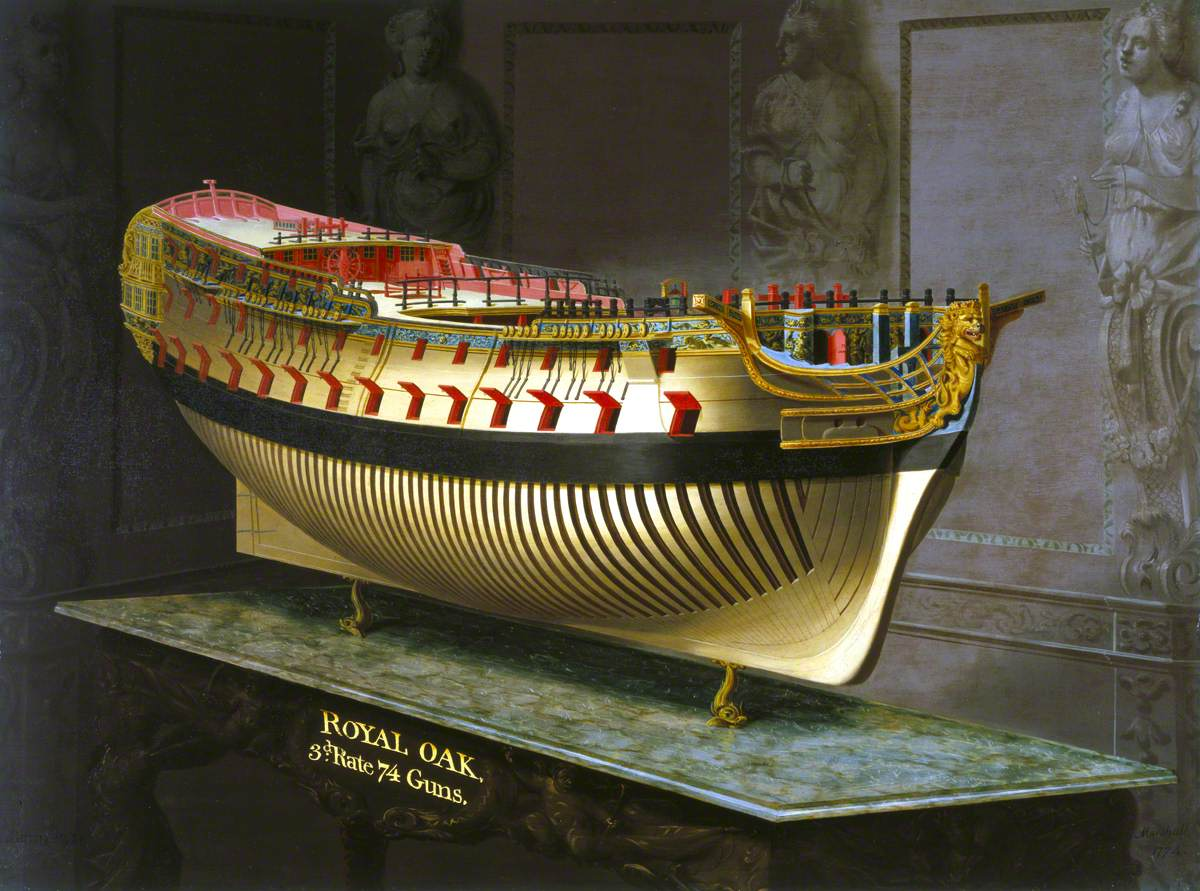
HMS Royal Oak, by Joseph Marshall

HMS Royal Oak was a 74-gun third rate ship of the line of the Royal Navy, built by Israel Pownoll and launched on 13 November 1769 at Plymouth.

She was not fully commissioned until the Falklands Crisis of 1770. Her first commander was Captain Molyneux Shuldham. Other notable commanders include Sir Peter Parker from November 1775 until October 1776. Johnathon Faulknor from October 176 until January 1778. Henry Francis Evans April/May 1778. Sir George Home July/August 1779. Sir Digby Dent August to December 1779.

She spent all of her first years in Plymouth and in 1773 formed part of the Spithead Review where the strength of the Navy was displayed to King George III. Not until December 1778 did she begin to partake in meaningful duties, when she then sailed over the Atlantic to the West Indies. In 1779 she was posted to the Leeward Islands. On 6 July 1779 she took part in the Battle of Grenada.

From January to April 1780 she was refitted with a copper bottom in Portsmouth Docks. She sailed for North America in May 1780 and arrived in July.

On 16 March 1781 she took part in the Battle of Cape Henry fighting the French fleet off the American coast. In August 1781 she captured the American sloop Aurora (16 gun). She fought the French again at the Battle of the Chesapeake on 5 September 1781. In December she was re-posted to the West Indies and on 12 April 1782 took part in the huge Battle of the Saintes as the final ship of the Red Squadron, in which action she delivered the fatal blow to the French ship "Cesar". After this action she returned to North America before being returned to Portsmouth in 1783 for repair. Although some works were carried out a full refit proved uneconomic and she sat for many years unused in Portsmouth Docks.

Royal Oak was converted for use as a prison ship for French prisoners-of-war in 1796, and was broken up in 1815.
