= HMS Conqueror (1773) =

Ship of the line of the Royal Navy

History

Great Britain
- Name: HMS Conqueror
- Ordered: 12 October 1768
- Builder: Plymouth Dockyard
- Laid down: October 1769
- Launched: 10 October 1773
- Fate: Broken up, 1794

General characteristics
- Class & type: Royal Oak-class ship of the line
- Tons burthen: 1606
- Length: 168 ft 6 in (51.36 m) (gundeck)
- Beam: 46 ft 9 in (14.25 m)
- Depth of hold: 20 ft (6.1 m)
- Propulsion: Sails
- Sail plan: Full-rigged ship
- Armament: 74 guns: Gundeck: 28 × 32 pdrs; Upper gundeck: 28 × 18 pdrs; Quarterdeck: 14 × 9 pdrs; Forecastle: 4 × 9 pdrs

HMS Conqueror was a 74-gun third rate ship of the line of the Royal Navy, built by Israel Pownoll and launched on 10 October 1773 at Plymouth.

May, 1778 under command of Capt. Thomas Graves.

She was commanded by Captain George Balfour in the Battle of the Saintes, 1782. Here she was fifth in line in the attack on the French fleet.

She was broken up in 1794.
