= HMS Defiance (1783) =

Ship of the line of the Royal Navy

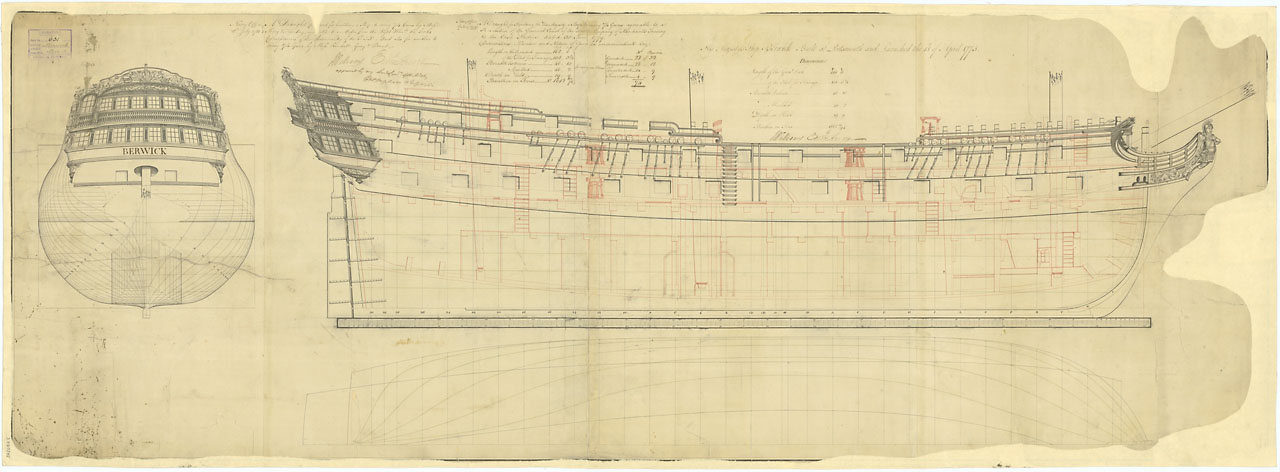
- Defiance

History

Great Britain
- Name: HMS Defiance
- Ordered: 11 July 1780
- Builder: Randall, Rotherhithe
- Laid down: April 1782
- Launched: 10 December 1783
- Honours and awards: Participated in: Battle of Copenhagen; Battle of Cape Finisterre; Battle of Trafalgar
- Fate: Broken up, 1817

General characteristics
- Class & type: Elizabeth-class ship of the line
- Tons burthen: 1685 bm
- Length: 168 ft 6 in (51.36 m) (gundeck)
- Beam: 46 ft 4 in (14.12 m)
- Depth of hold: 19 ft 9 in (6.02 m)
- Propulsion: Sails
- Sail plan: Full-rigged ship
- Armament: Gundeck: 28 × 32-pounder guns; Upper gundeck: 28 × 18-pounder guns; QD: 14 × 9-pounder guns; Fc: 4 × 9-pounder guns

HMS Defiance was a 74-gun third rate ship of the line of the Royal Navy, built by Randall and Co., at Rotherhithe on the River Thames, and launched on 10 December 1783.

== History ==
She was commissioned by Lt M.T. Hewitt for Captain George Keppel. He sailed her with the Channel Fleet during September and October 1796 at which time it was reported that,

Her qualifications are described as having been of a very superior order. She stowed her provisions well, and when sailing with the Channel fleet in September and October, 1796, beat all the line of battle ships, and kept pace with the frigates. " Upon a wind," Rays the Master's report, " spared them" (the line of battle ships) " main-sail and top-gallant sails, and sailing two or three points free or before the wind, beat them still more." At this time the Defiance's draught of water forward was 20 feet 5 inches; aft, 22 feet 5 inches; height of the midship port, 5 feet 8 inches. Her masts were stayed thus: "foremast nearly upright, main and mizenmasts rake aft."

Her crew mutinied three times, firstly in October 1795, when she was under the command of Captain Sir George Home. He initially had to release the ringleaders when the ratings attempted to storm the officer's quarters, but later these and additional mutineers were put in irons when,

...in the afternoon a strong party of the 7th, or South Fencible regiment, and several officers, arrived on board. On the 20th, at 10 a.m., a general muster of the ship's company was made, and the eight men, previously in irons, together with three more, were placed in confinement, and others were subsequently added. A few days afterwards the South Fencibles were relieved by a detachment of the 134th Regt., in number 132, under Lieut.-Colonel Baillie, and with these the Defiance sailed from Leith and returned to the Nore.

The stationing of the Army troops was required because the ship sailed without its contingent of 60 Marines, which later embarked at Sheerness.

On 23 March 1796 Captain Theophilus Jones took command.

The crew of the Defiance mutinied for a second time in 1797 during the Spithead mutiny. Captain William Bligh of the Calcutta was ordered to embark 200 troops and take them alongside in order for the troops to board Defiance and regain control, however the threat of the soldiers was sufficient to bring about an end to the mutiny. Her next Captain was Thomas Revell Shivers, who took command on 27 February 1797 at Torbay

In July 1798, while rebellion raged in Ireland, a court martial aboard HMS Defiance took evidence of United Irish oaths being administered as a prelude to a further mutiny. Eleven of the crew were hanged and ten sentenced to transportation.

In the summer of 1800, Defiance was attached to the squadron under Sir Alan Gardner, stationed off the Black Rocks. On 24 December 1800, Capt. Richard Retallick superseded Capt. Shivers, Defiance being selected for the flagship of Rear Admiral Sir Thomas Graves.

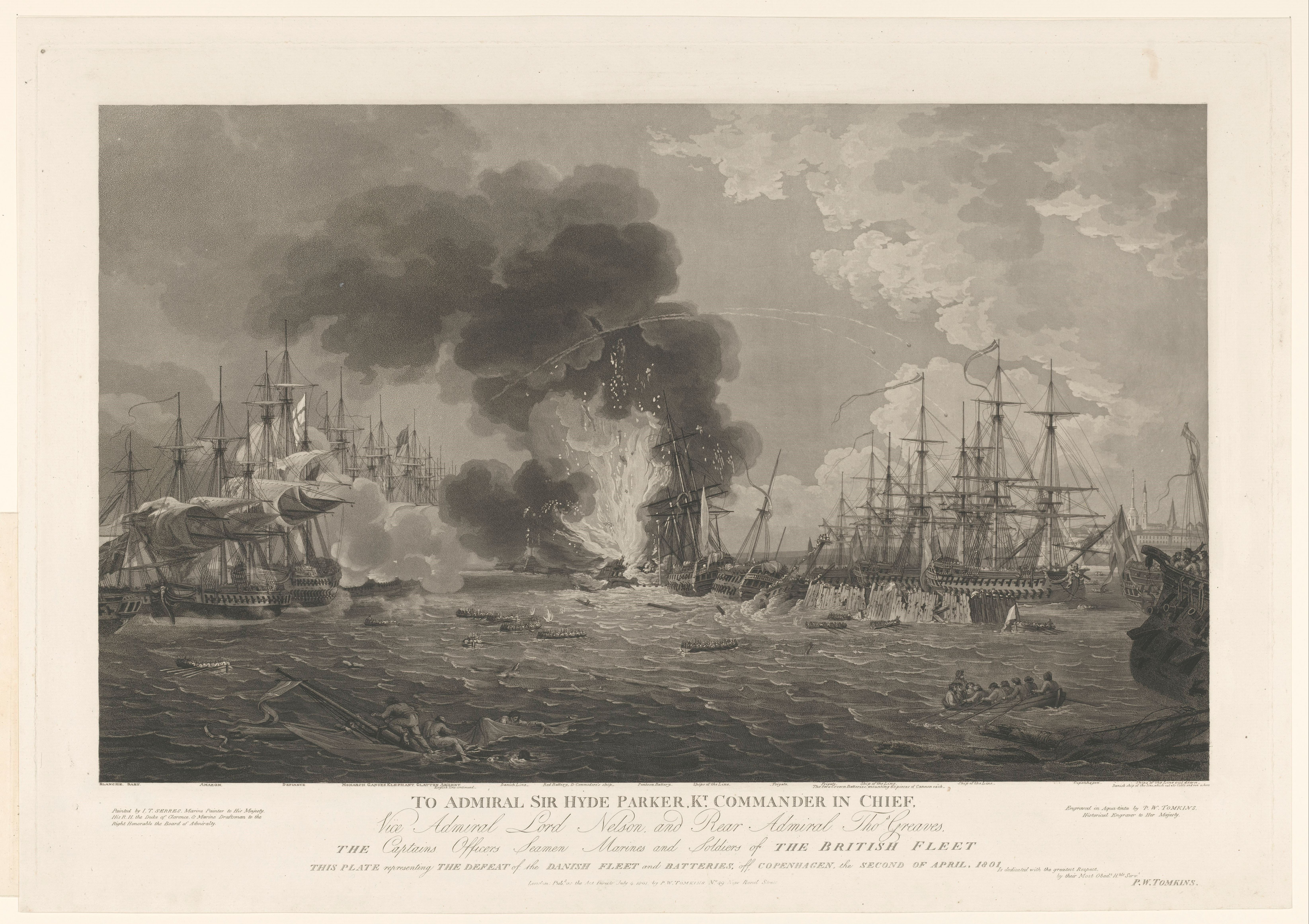
Defiance at Copenhagen, 1801

She fought at the Battle of Copenhagen on 2 April 1801, as the flagship of Rear Admiral Thomas Graves, with Captain Retallick commanding. The station in the line occupied in the battle was abreast of the Crown battery, which mounted thirty-six heavy guns, and was provided with a furnace for heating shot. Owing to the mishaps that kept Bellona, Russell, and Agamemnon from taking up their assigned stations, the Defiance became exposed to a severe cross fire, from which she suffered very severe damage.

In furtherance of the designs of Lord Nelson, when Sir Hyde Parker made the signal to discontinue the action, which Nelson would not see, Rear-Admiral Graves in the Defiance repeated the signal at the lee maintopsail yardarm, from whence it could not be seen on board the Elephant. The Defiance continued firing until 3h. 15m. p.m., when the action ceased; and her spring being cut and sail made, she dropped out of the station she had occupied. Shortly afterwards, the Defiance grounded, and was with difficulty hove off, after starting thirty butts of water. During the action the ship was frequently set on fire by the hot 42-pound shot fired from the batteries, and her damages were consequently serious. Her loss in killed and wounded was as follows Lieutenant George Gray*, Matthew Cobb, pilot, 17 seamen, 3 marines, and 2 soldiers, killed; and the boatswain Lewis Patterson, James Galloway, Midshipman, Harry Niblett, Captain's Clerk, – Stephenson, pilot, 35 seamen, 5 marines, and 7 soldiers, wounded: total, 24 killed, and 51 wounded.

=== Finnisterre and Trafalgar ===
She also participated in the Battle of Cape Finisterre on 22 July 1805, and the Battle of Trafalgar on 21 October, whilst under the command of Captain Philip Charles Durham, who claimed that "she was the fastest 74 gun ship in the British fleet".

At Trafalgar the Defiance captured the Spanish San Juan Nepomuceno, and the French Aigle (although the following day the French crew managed to recapture the Aigle from the British prize crew shortly before she was wrecked during the storm of 23 October).

Prior to the boarding of the Aigle by a full boarding party from the Defiance, James "Jack" Spratt dived into the sea from Defiance, swimming with a cutlass between his teeth to the Aigle he climbed in through a stern window and boarded her single handed. He found his way to the French poop deck and threw himself on the French crew, one man against several hundred. In the melee he killed two French seamen, and was grappling with a third when he fell from the poop deck to the main deck, killing his opponent but injuring himself badly. He was saved by the timely arrival of a full boarding party from Defiance.

During the battle of Trafalgar Defiance and sustained casualties of 57 killed, and 153 wounded.

=== Final service and fate ===
In 1809, she took part in the Battle of Les Sables-d'Olonne.

Lloyd's List reported in February 1809 that the man-of-war Defiance had sent the French cutter Prudente into Plymouth. Prudente had been on her way from Guadaloupe.

== Fate ==
After serving as a prison ship at Chatham from 1813, she was broken up in 1817.

== Captains ==
- 1794 Captain George Keppel
- 1795 Captain Sir George Home, 7th Baronet
- 1796 Captain Theophilus Jones
- 1799 Captain T.R. Shivers
- 1801 Captain R. Retalick
- 1805 Captain Philip Charles Durham
- 1807 Captain Henry Hotham
- 1811 Captain Richard Raggett

== Trafalgar Wood Project ==
As a part of the Trafalgar Wood Project to commemorate the 33 Royal Navy ships that were at Trafalgar, a wood of 10 acres (40,000 m^{2}) was planted in October/November 2005 in Dumfries, Dumfries and Galloway, Scotland to honour HMS Defiance.
