= Three Cups, Harwich =

Former historic public house in Harwich, Essex, England

Coordinates: 51.9460°N 1.2883°E

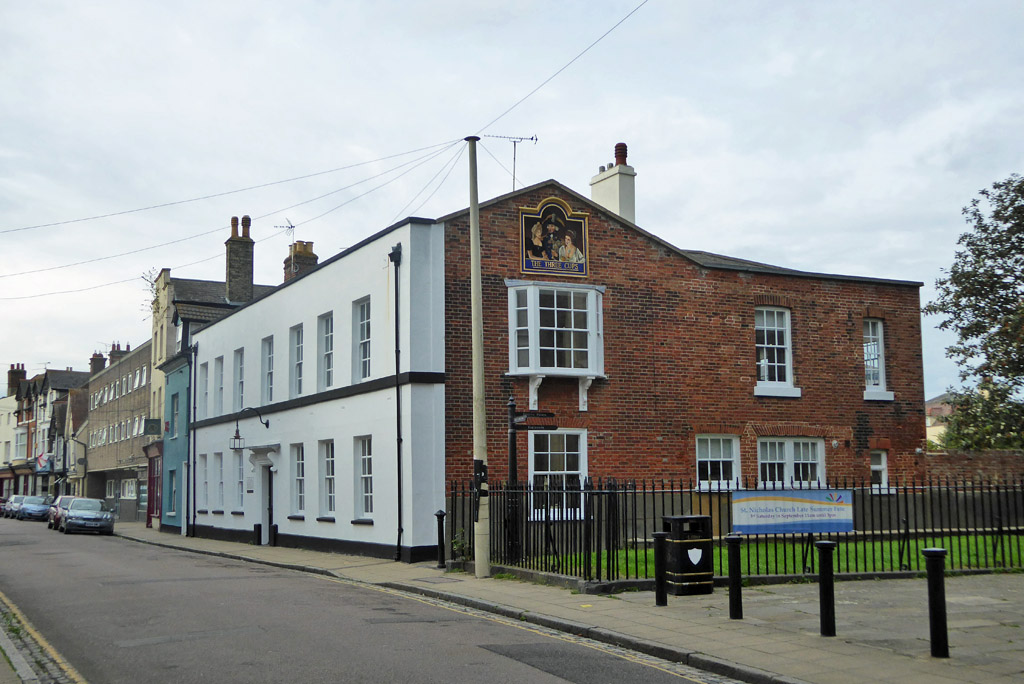
The Three Cups building

The Three Cups was a historic public house and hotel which played a prominent role in Harwich until it was converted to a private house in 1995. The current building was built around 1500, but there are more speculative claims that a public house existed on the site before this. The building is located at 64 Church Street, next to St Nicholas' church.

== Celebrations marked at the Three Cups ==
The Three Cups has frequently been the venue of the celebration of significant events over the years:

=== Launch and relaunch of ships ===
- Launch of HMS Sultan (1775), 23 December 1775.
- Relaunch of HMS Magicienne, 18 January 1793.
