= HMS Vengeance (1774) =

Royal Oak-class ship of the line

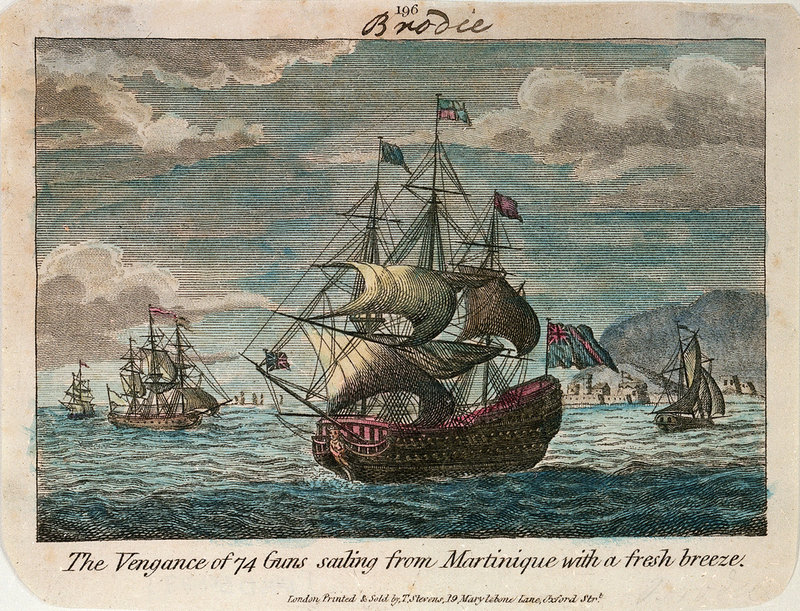
- Contemporary engraving

History

Great Britain
- Name: HMS Vengeance
- Ordered: 14 January 1771
- Builder: Randall, Rotherhithe
- Laid down: April 1771
- Launched: 25 June 1774
- Fate: Broken up, 1816

General characteristics
- Class & type: Royal Oak-class ship of the line
- Tons burthen: 1626 37/94 (bm))
- Length: 168 ft 6 in (51.36 m) (gundeck)
- Beam: 46 ft 9 in (14.25 m)
- Depth of hold: 20 ft (6.1 m)
- Propulsion: Sails
- Sail plan: Full-rigged ship
- Armament: 74 guns: Gundeck: 28 × 32 pdrs; Upper gundeck: 28 × 18 pdrs; Quarterdeck: 14 × 9 pdrs; Forecastle: 4 × 9 pdrs

HMS Vengeance was a 74-gun third rate ship of the line of the Royal Navy, launched on 25 June 1774 at Rotherhithe. By 1780, she was at the island of Martinique, and was driven ashore and damaged at Saint Lucia in the Great Hurricane of 1780 but recovered and made her way to Portsmouth to be repaired. Finished in 1803, the ship was put into reserve before becoming a prison ship in the year 1808.

She was broken up in 1816.
