= HMS Hector (1774) =

Royal Oak-class ship of the line

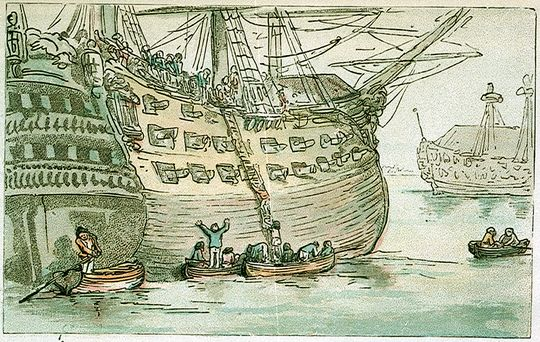
- Going aboard Hector in 1891

History

Great Britain
- Name: HMS Hector
- Ordered: 14 January 1771
- Builder: Adams, Deptford
- Laid down: April 1771
- Launched: 27 May 1774
- Honours and awards: Naval General Service Medal with clasp "Egypt"
- Fate: Broken up, 1816

General characteristics
- Class & type: Royal Oak-class ship of the line
- Tons burthen: 1622 (bm)
- Length: 168 ft 6 in (51.36 m) (gundeck)
- Beam: 46 ft 9 in (14.25 m)
- Depth of hold: 20 ft (6.1 m)
- Propulsion: Sails
- Sail plan: Full-rigged ship
- Armament: Gundeck: 28 × 32-pounder guns; Upper gundeck: 28 × 18-pounder guns; QD: 14 × 9-pounder guns; Fc: 4 × 9-pounder guns

HMS Hector was a 74-gun third rate ship of the line of the Royal Navy, launched on 27 May 1774 at Deptford.

== Career ==
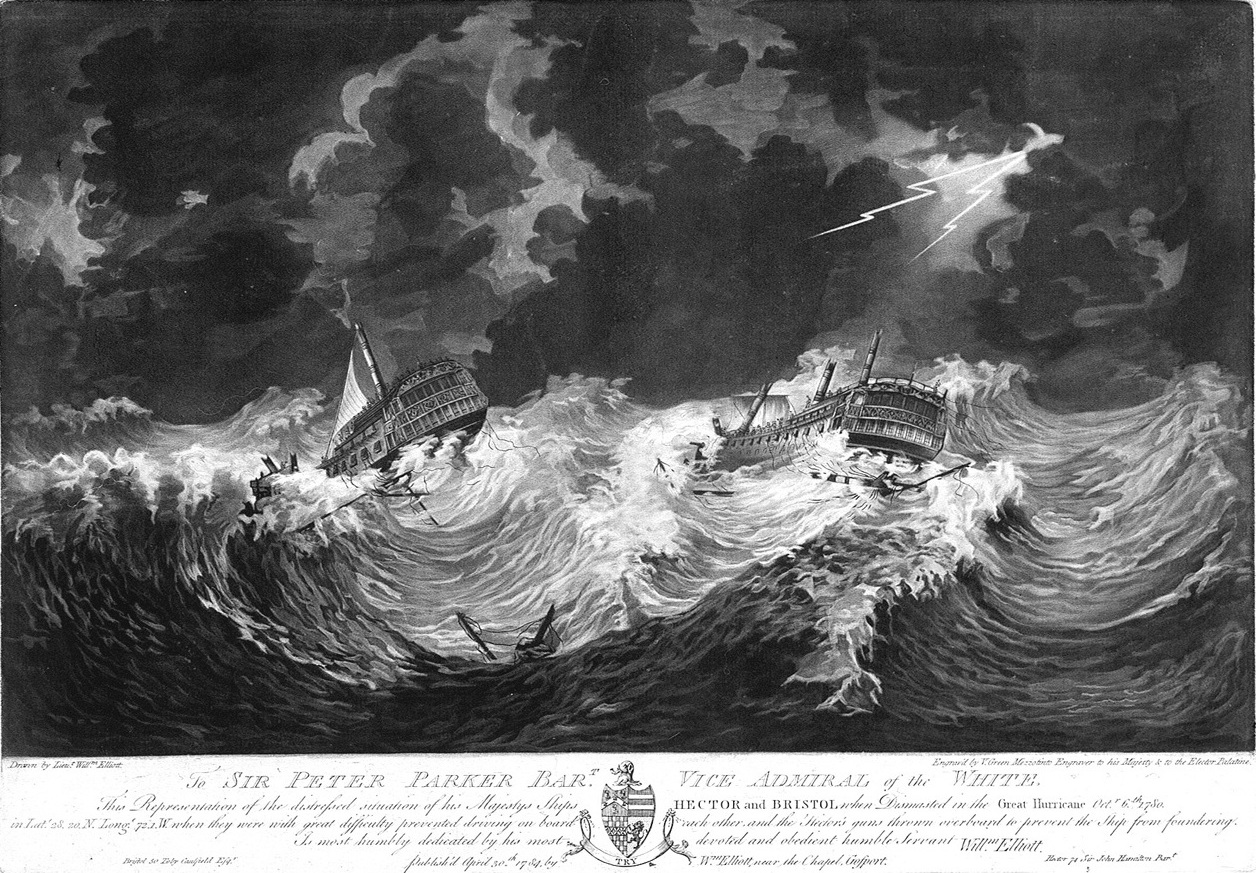
HMS Hector and Bristol in distress during the Great Hurricane of 1780

On 10 January 1778 she captured French merchant ship "Thomas Koulican" (or Kouli Kan) at (46°00′N 09°00′W). On 9 May 1801 Hector, Kent, and Cruelle unsuccessfully chased the French corvette Heliopolis, which eluded them and slipped into Alexandria.

Because Hector served in the navy's Egyptian campaign (8 March to 8 September 1801), her officers and crew qualified for the clasp "Egypt" to the Naval General Service Medal that the Admiralty authorised in 1850 for all surviving claimants. (Note: A first-class share of the prize money awarded in April 1823 was worth £34 2s 4d; a fifth-class share, that of a seaman, was worth 3s 11½d. The amount was small as the total had to be shared between 79 vessels and the entire army contingent.)

== Fate ==
Hector was converted for use as a prison ship in 1808, and was broken up in 1816.
