= HMS Stirling Castle (1775) =

Worcester-class ship of the line

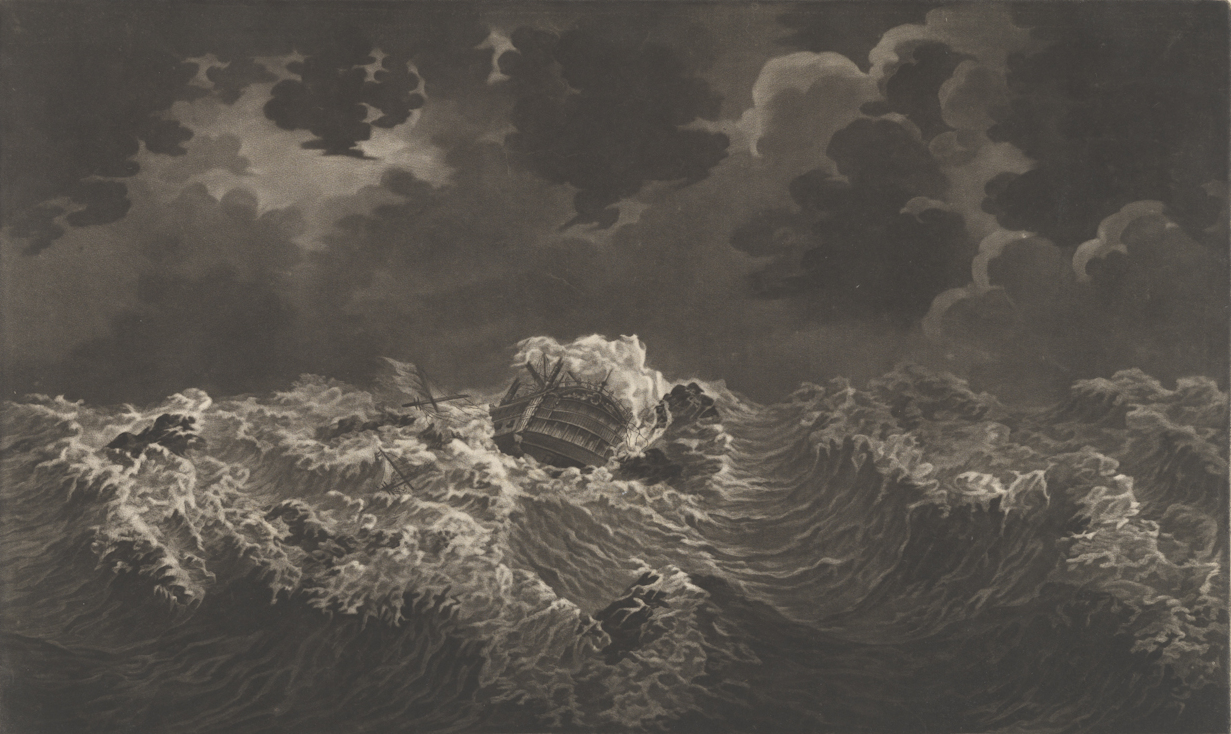
- Stirling Castle sinking in Great Hurricane of 1780

History

Great Britain
- Name: Stirling Castle
- Ordered: 12 October 1768
- Builder: Chatham Dockyard
- Laid down: October 1769
- Launched: 28 June 1775
- Fate: Wrecked, 5 October 1780

General characteristics
- Class & type: Worcester-class ship of the line
- Tons burthen: 1377 21/94 (bm)
- Length: 159 ft (48 m) (gundeck)
- Beam: 44 ft 6 in (13.56 m)
- Depth of hold: 19 ft 10 in (6.05 m)
- Propulsion: Sails
- Sail plan: Full-rigged ship
- Armament: 64 guns: Gundeck: 26 × 24 pdrs; Upper gundeck: 26 × 18 pdrs; Quarterdeck: 10 × 4 pdrs; Forecastle: 2 × 9 pdrs

HMS Stirling Castle was a 64-gun Worcester class third-rate ship of the line of the Royal Navy. She was built by Israel Pownoll and launched on 28 June 1775 at Chatham Dockyard.

Stirling Castle was wrecked on 5 October 1780 on the Silver Keys, off Cap-François, off the coast of Cuba with the loss of most of her crew. As the Massachusetts ship Aurora was sailing from Boston to Port-au-Prince she came upon the wreckage of Stirling Castle and was able to save a midshipman and four seamen.

== Bibliography ==
- Hepper, David J. (1994) British Warship Losses in the Age of Sail, 1650–1859. (Rotherfield: Jean Boudriot). ISBN 0-948864-30-3
- Lavery, Brian (1983) The Ship of the Line – Volume 1: The development of the battlefleet 1650–1850. Conway Maritime Press. ISBN 0-85177-252-8.
