= Worcester-class ship of the line =

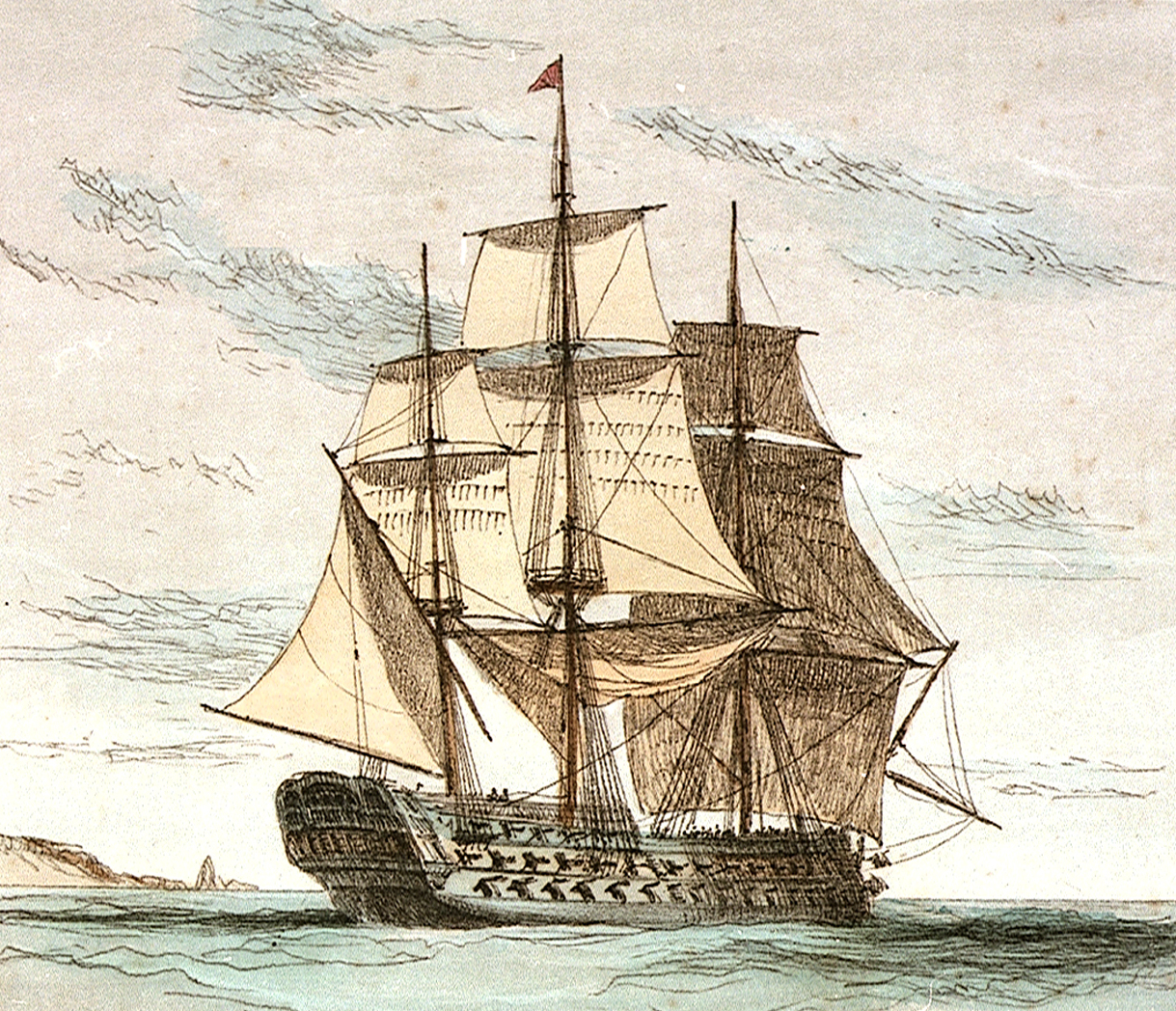
- HMS Lion in 1794

Class overview
- Name: Worcester
- Operators: Royal Navy
- Preceded by: Intrepid class
- Succeeded by: Inflexible class
- In service: 17 October 1769 – 1837
- Completed: 3
- Lost: 1

General characteristics
- Type: Ship of the line
- Length: 159 ft (48.5 m) (gundeck); 130 ft 7 1/2 in (39.8 m) (keel)
- Beam: 44 ft 6 in (13.6 m)
- Propulsion: Sails
- Armament: 64 guns: Gundeck: 26 × 24 pounders; Upper gundeck: 26 × 18 pdrs; Quarterdeck: 10 × 4 pdrs; Forecastle: 2 × 9 pdrs
- Notes: Ships in class include: Worcester, Stirling Castle, Lion

The Worcester-class ships of the line were a class of three 64-gun third rates, designed for the Royal Navy by Sir Thomas Slade.

== Ships ==
- HMS Worcester

Builder: Portsmouth Dockyard
Ordered: 16 November 1765
Launched: 17 October 1769
Fate: Broken up, 1816

- HMS Stirling Castle

Builder: Chatham Dockyard
Ordered: 12 October 1768
Launched: 28 June 1775
Fate: Wrecked, 1780

- HMS Lion

Builder: Portsmouth Dockyard
Ordered: 12 October 1768
Launched: 3 September 1777
Fate: Sold out of the service, 1837
