= HMS Worcester (1769) =

Ship of the line of the Royal Navy

- Worcester

History

Great Britain
- Name: HMS Worcester
- Ordered: 16 November 1765
- Builder: Portsmouth Dockyard
- Laid down: 6 May 1766
- Launched: 17 October 1769
- Fate: Broken up, 1816
- Notes: Participated in: Battle of Cuddalore

General characteristics
- Class & type: Worcester-class ship of the line
- Tons burthen: 137949/94 (bm)
- Length: 159 ft (48 m) (gundeck)
- Beam: 44 ft 6 in (13.56 m)
- Depth of hold: 19 ft 10 in (6.05 m)
- Propulsion: Sails
- Sail plan: Full-rigged ship
- Armament: 64 guns: Gundeck: 26 × 24 pdrs; Upper gundeck: 26 × 18 pdrs; Quarterdeck: 10 × 4 pdrs; Forecastle: 2 × 9 pdrs

HMS Worcester was a 64-gun Worcester class third-rate ship of the line of the Royal Navy. Launched on 17 October 1769 at Portsmouth, she was the fourth ship to bear the name.

In 1783, Worcester took part in the Battle of Cuddalore.

She was broken up in Deptford in 1816, after having been hulked in 1788. She is known as the ship on which Lord Nelson won an acting commission in 1776 as the fourth lieutenant.
