= Joseph Marshall (traveller) =

British traveler of 2nd half of the 18th century

Joseph Marshall (years of birth and death are unknown) — British traveler of 2nd half of the 18th century. He is the author of Travels in Holland, Flanders, Germany, of Denmark, Sweden, Lapland, Russia, Ukraine and Poland (v. 1-3, 1772).

Scholars of Ukrainian history remember him as one of the first British travelers, alongside John Bell and Edward Daniel Clarke, to leave a written account of that land.

In 1770 he traveled the route Staradoff (Starodub) — Chernihiv — Kiovia (Kyiv) — Ochakiv. In his work he described the natural wealth of Ukraine, stressed the high level of farming by Ukrainian peasants and paid much attention to the possibility of increasing imports to England from the Ukraine hemp and flax.

Between 1773 and 1775, a German translation of his volumes was published in Danzig; the first volume was reprinted in 1776. 1776 also saw the publication of a French translation based on the second edition, attributed to Pingeron, "Captain of Artillery & Engineer in the service of Poland"; he has been identified as Jean-Claude Pingeron.

Also in 1776 came Travels through France and Spain, in the years 1770 and 1771, presented as the fourth volume of his Travels. This was also translated and issued in Danzig in 1778.

== Works ==
- Joseph Marshall (1773), Travels through Holland, Flanders, Germany, Denmark, Sweden, Lapland, Russia, the Ukraine & Poland in the years 1768, 1769, & 1770 (2nd ed.), London: Printed for J. Almon.
- Travels through France and Spain, in the years 1770 and 1771 : In which is particularly minuted, the present state of those countries, respecting the agriculture, population. By Marshall, Joseph, fl. 1770 Corrall, George, Published 1776.

== Bibliography ==
- Маршалл (Marshall) Джозеф. // Українська радянська енциклопедія : у 12 т. / за ред. М. Бажана. — 2-ге вид. — Київ: Гол. редакція УРЕ, 1974–1985. — Т. 6. — 1982. (in Ukrainian)
- Україна в англійських джерелах. // Брицький П. П., Бочан П. О. Німці, французи і англійці про Україну та український народ у XVII–XIX століттях. — Чернівці: Технодрук, 2011. — С. 232–239. ISBN 978-966-8658-82-2 (Ukraine in English sources) (in Ukrainian)
