= HMS Vigilant (1774) =

Ship of the line of the Royal Navy

- Vigilant

History

Great Britain
- Name: HMS Vigilant
- Ordered: 14 January 1771
- Builder: Adams, Bucklers Hard
- Laid down: February 1771
- Launched: 6 October 1774
- Fate: Broken up, 1816

General characteristics
- Class & type: Intrepid-class ship of the line
- Tons burthen: 1347 bm
- Length: 159 ft 6 in (48.62 m) (gundeck)
- Beam: 44 ft 4 in (13.51 m)
- Depth of hold: 19 ft (5.8 m)
- Propulsion: Sails
- Sail plan: Full-rigged ship
- Armament: 64 guns: Gundeck: 26 × 24 pdrs; Upper gundeck: 26 × 18 pdrs; Quarterdeck: 10 × 4 pdrs; Forecastle: 2 × 9 pdrs

HMS Vigilant was a 64-gun third-rate ship of the line of the Royal Navy, launched on 6 October 1774 at Bucklers Hard.

By 1779 she had been deemed unseaworthy by the navy. She was stripped of her sails and used as a floating battery to support the amphibious landing of British Army troops on Port Royal Island, South Carolina prior to the Battle of Beaufort. From 1799 she served as a prison ship, and was broken up in 1816.
