= Joseph Marshall (painter) =

British painter

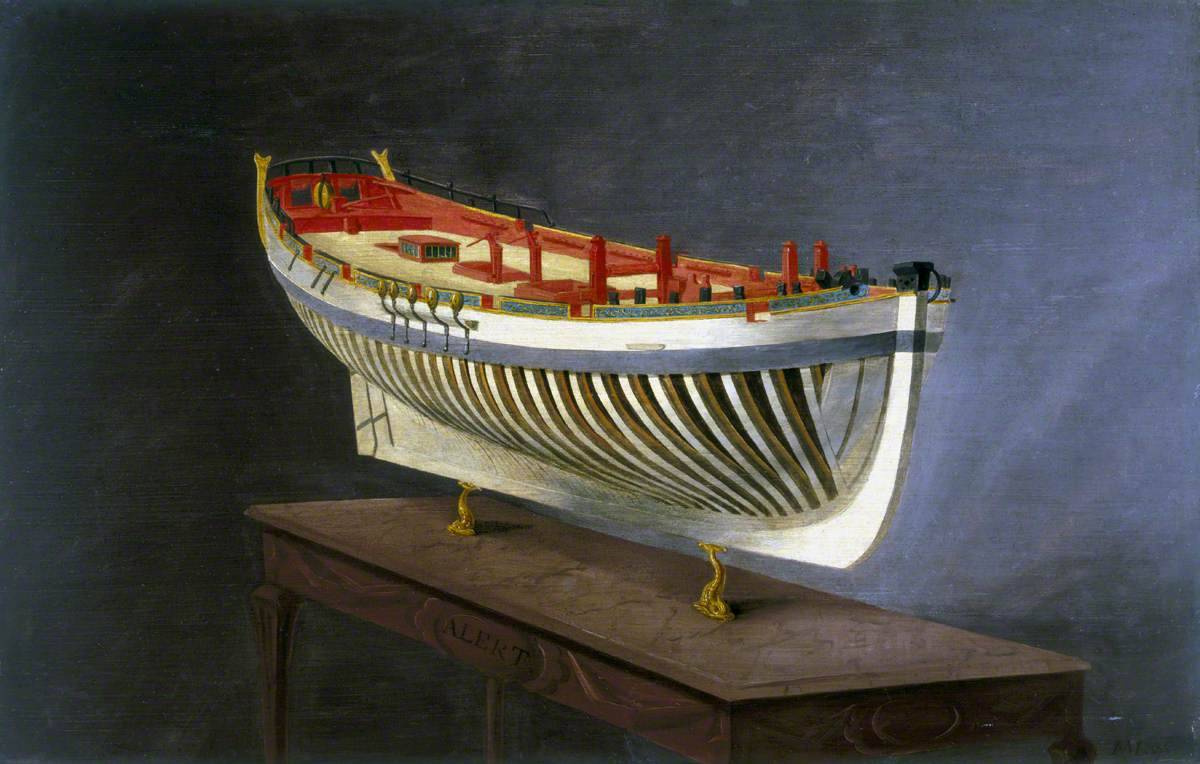
The cutter Alert (1753), bow view, painted 1755

Joseph Marshall (active 1755–1779) was a British painter who specialised in marine art. He is best known as the painter of a series of paintings of ship models, commissioned by George III of Great Britain in 1773 but only completed in 1779. He worked from the ships' plans rather than models to produce bow and stern images of ten ships, representing every class in the Royal Navy at that time. These ten ships were HMS Ambuscade, Portland, Sphinx, Kingfisher, Barfleur, Royal George, Enterprise, Experiment, Royal Oak, and Intrepid. He had previously produced two similar paintings of Alert in 1755.

Twenty of the paintings were given to the Science Museum, London by Queen Victoria and two showing stern views of HMS Enterprise and HMS Royal George are now in the National Maritime Museum The two of Alert were given separately to the Science Museum in 1904.

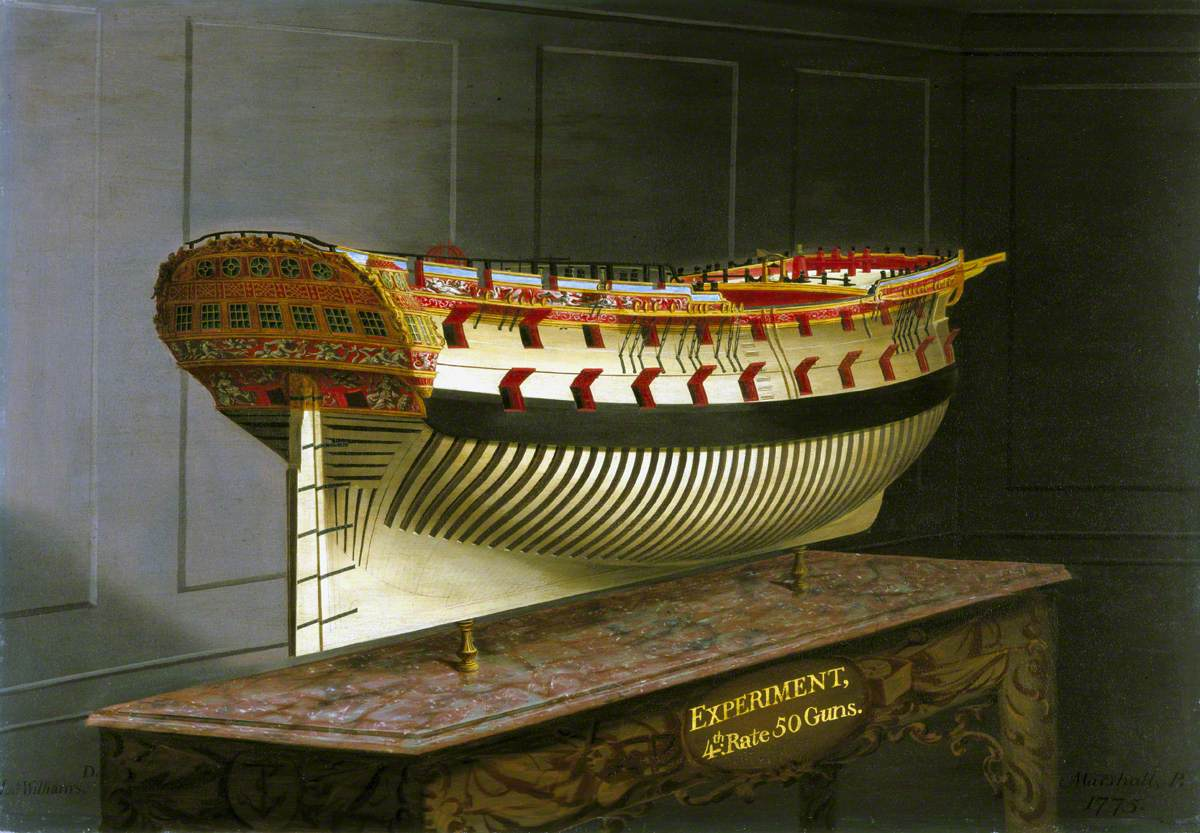
HMS Experiment (1774) 4th rate 50 guns, stern view painted in 1775

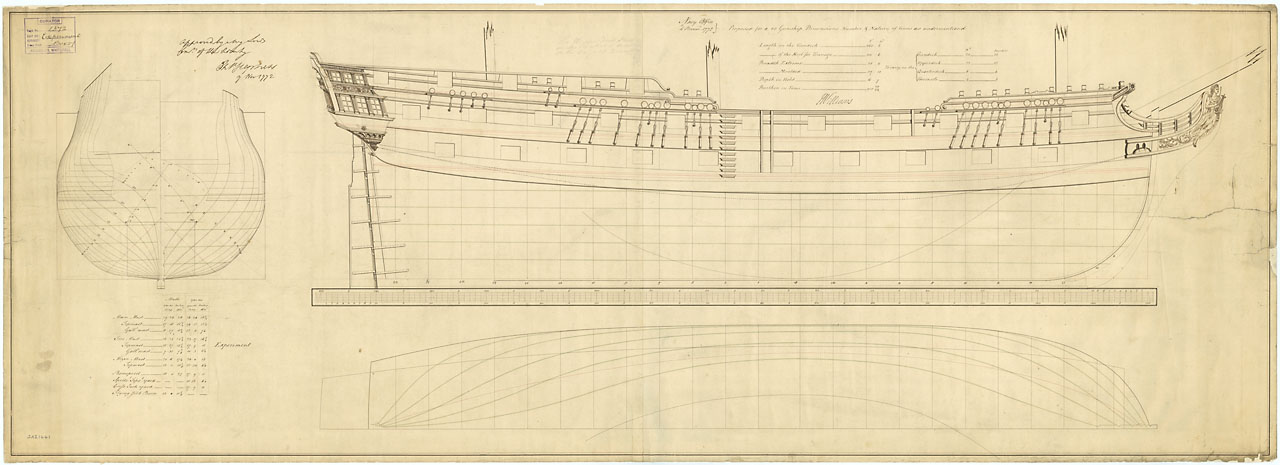
Plan showing Experiment's body with quarter gallery decoration and figurehead, and longitudinal half-breadth proposed and approved in 1774, a 50-gun Fourth Rate, two-decker. The plan includes a table of the mast and yard dimensions.

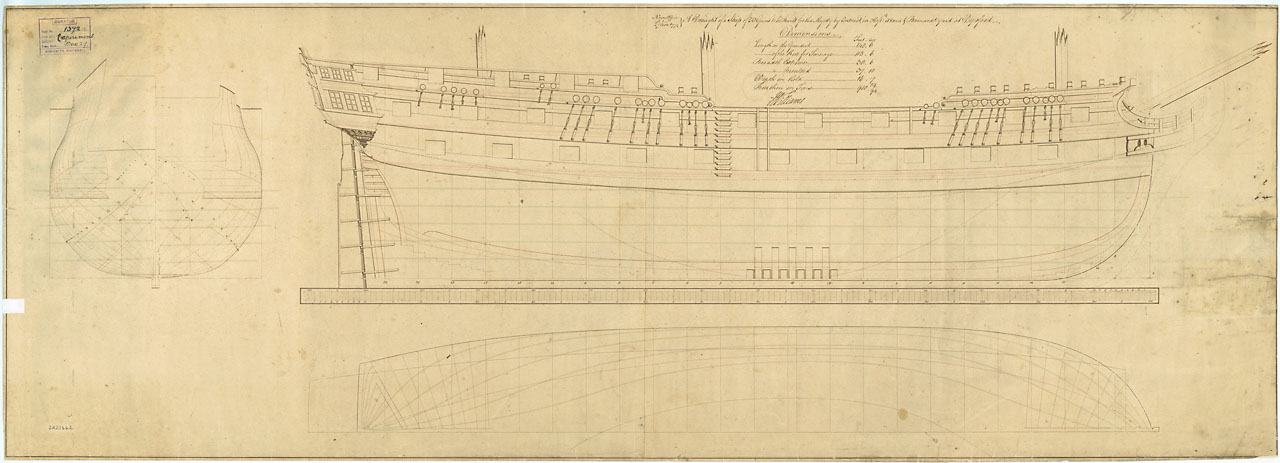
Another version of the body plan, showing her sheer lines, and longitudinal half-breadth for build at Deptford by Messrs Adams & Barnard

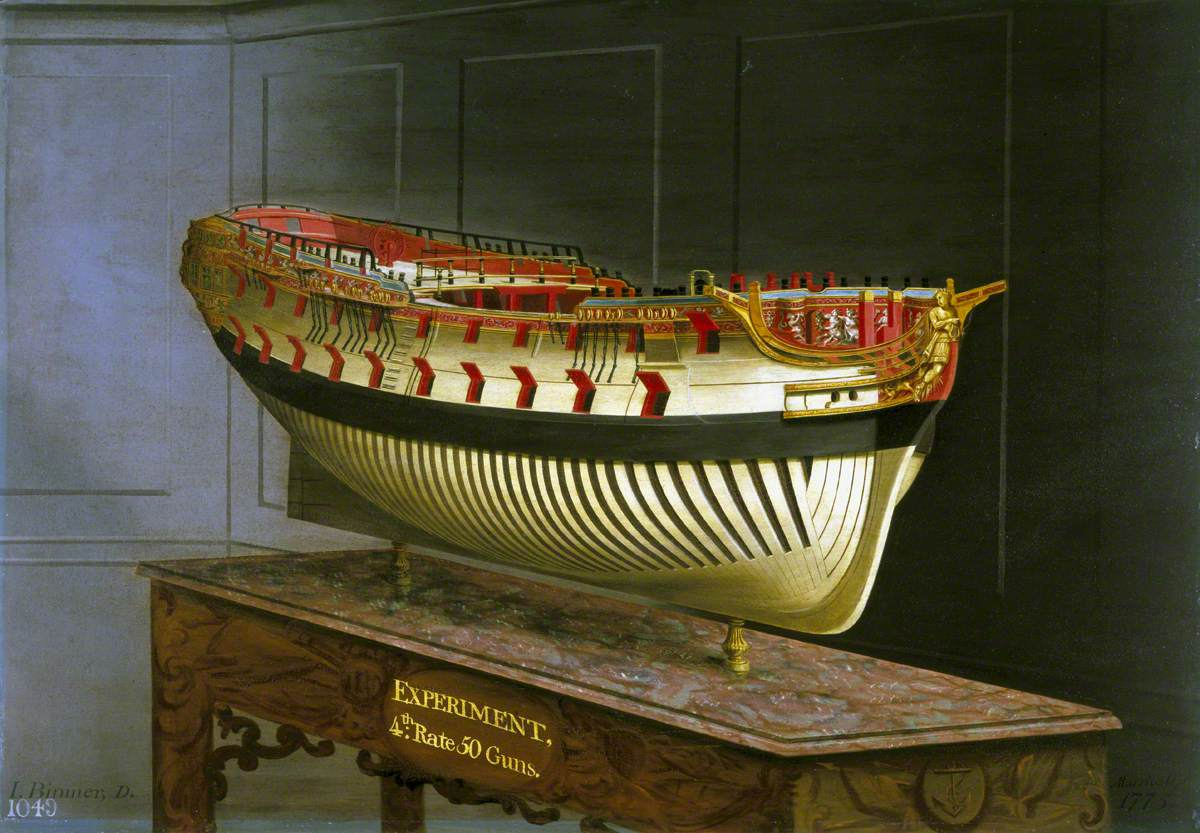
HMS Experiment, bow view painted in 1775
