= Royal Oak-class ship of the line =

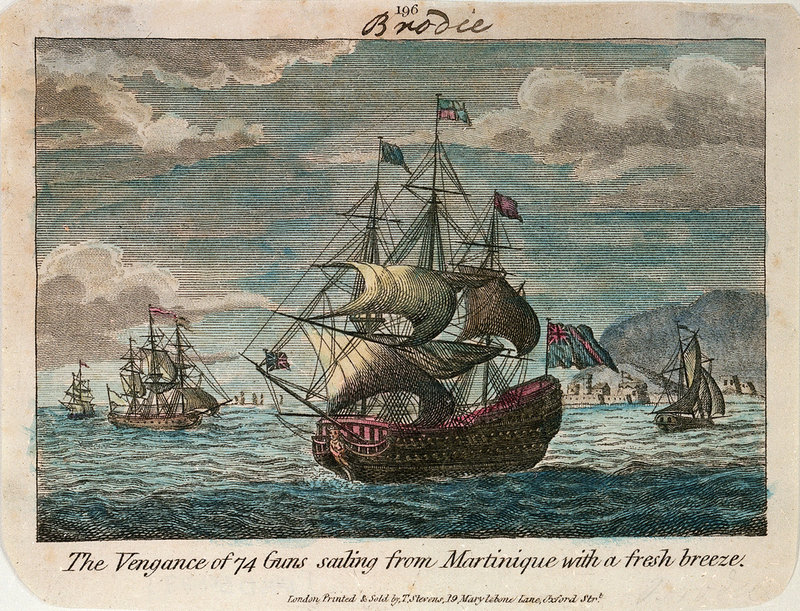
- HMS Vengeance

Class overview
- Name: Royal Oak
- Operators: Royal Navy
- Preceded by: Elizabeth class
- Succeeded by: Culloden class
- In service: 13 November 1769 - 1818
- Completed: 6

General characteristics
- Type: Ship of the line
- Length: 168 ft 6 in (51.4 m) (gundeck); 138 ft 2 in (42.1 m) (keel)
- Beam: 46 ft 9 in (14.2 m)
- Propulsion: Sails
- Armament: 74 guns: Gundeck: 28 × 32 pdrs; Upper gundeck: 28 × 18 pdrs; Quarterdeck: 14 × 9 pdrs; Forecastle: 4 × 9 pdrs
- Notes: Ships in class include: Royal Oak, Conqueror, Bedford, Hector, Vengeance, Sultan

The Royal Oak-class ships of the line were a class of six 74-gun third rates, designed for the Royal Navy by Sir John Williams. The Alfred class were an enlarged version of the Royal Oak class.

== Ships ==
- HMS Royal Oak

Builder: Plymouth Dockyard
Ordered: 16 November 1765
Launched: 13 November 1769
Fate: Broken up, 1815

- HMS Conqueror

Builder: Plymouth Dockyard
Ordered: 12 October 1768
Laid Down: October 1769
Launched: 18 October 1773
Completed for Sea: 12 July 1777
Fate: Broken up, November 1794

- HMS Bedford

Builder: Woolwich Dockyard
Ordered: 12 October 1768
Launched: 27 October 1775
Fate: Broken up, 1817

- HMS Hector

Builder: Adams, Deptford
Ordered: 14 January 1771
Launched: 27 May 1774
Fate: Broken up, 1816

- HMS Vengeance

Builder: Randall, Rotherhithe
Ordered: 14 January 1771
Launched: 25 June 1774
Fate: Broken up, 1816

- HMS Sultan

Builder: Barnard, Harwich
Ordered: 14 January 1771
Launched: 23 December 1775
Fate: Broken up, 1816
