= HMS Boyne (1766) =

Royal Navy third-rate ship of the line

History

Great Britain
- Name: HMS Boyne
- Ordered: 13 May 1758
- Builder: Plymouth Dockyard
- Laid down: 9 August 1758
- Launched: 31 May 1766
- Fate: Broken up, 1783

General characteristics
- Class & type: 1754 amendments 70-gun third rate ship of the line
- Tons burthen: 1426 87/94
- Length: 162 ft (49.4 m) (gundeck)
- Beam: 44 ft 8 in (13.6 m)
- Draught: 11 ft 4 1/2 in (3.5 m) bow; 17 ft 9 in (5.4 m) stern
- Depth of hold: 19 ft (5.8 m)
- Propulsion: Sails
- Sail plan: Full-rigged ship
- Complement: 520
- Armament: 70 guns; Gundeck: 28 × 32-pdrs; Upper gundeck: 28 × 18-pdrs; Quarterdeck: 12 × 9-pdrs; Forecastle: 2 × 9-pdrs

HMS Boyne was a 70-gun third rate ship of the line of the Royal Navy, built at Plymouth Dockyard to the draught specified in the 1745 Establishment as amended in 1754, and launched on 31 May 1766. She was first commissioned for the Falkland Crisis of 1770 after which, in 1774, she sailed for North America. From March 1776, she served in the English Channel then, in May 1778, she was sent to the West Indies where she took part in the battles of St Lucia, Grenada and Martinique. In November 1780, Boyne returned home, where she was fitted for ordinary at Plymouth. In May 1783, she was broken up.

== Design, construction and armament ==
Ordered on 13 May 1758 for the Royal Navy, HMS Boyne was a third rate Burford-class ship of the line. Her keel was laid down at Plymouth Dockyard on 9 August 1758, under the supervision of master shipwright Thomas Bucknall. In May 1762, Bucknall was succeeded by Israel Pownoll who oversaw the completion of the ship. The cost of the build was £29,205.5.6d with a further £10,541.1.1d for fitting out.

Launched on 2 November 1773, Boyne's dimensions were: 162 feet (49.4 metres) along the gun deck, 134 ft 6 in (41.0 m) at the keel, with a beam of 44 ft 8 in (13.6 m) and a depth in hold of 19 ft 8 in (6.0 m). This made her 1,426 87/94 tons (bm). She had a draught of 11 ft 4 1/2 in (3.5 m) at the bow and 17 ft 9 in (5.4 m) at the stern.

Burford-class ships were rated as 70-gun ships. Boyne was armed with twenty-eight 32 pounders (15 kilograms) on her lower gun deck, twenty-eight 18 pounders (8.2 kilograms) on her upper gun-deck, twelve 9 pdr (4.1 kg) on the quarterdeck and two on the forecastle.

== Service ==
Boyne was first commissioned in October 1770 for service in the Falkland Islands during the Falkland Crisis of 1770 when a Spanish force captured Port Egmont. War was averted when the colony was returned in January 1771 and in 1774 Boyne sailed for North America where, in January 1775, she was listed as commanded by Captain Brodrick Hartwell, in a squadron under Vice-Admiral Samuel Graves. She returned to England in March 1776 to serve in the English Channel.

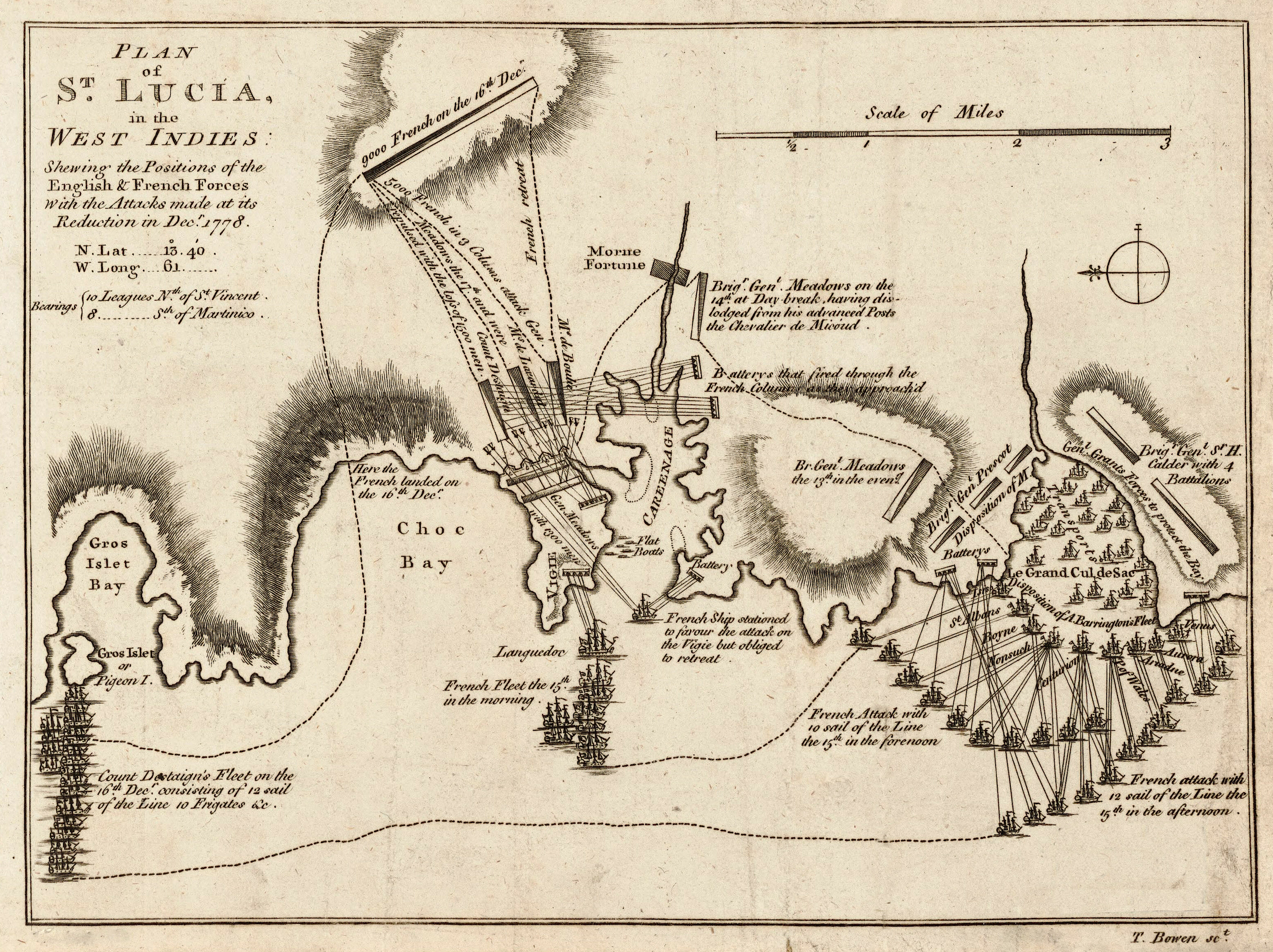
Engraving by Thomas Bowen showing the positions of British and French forces during the Battle of St Lucia in December 1778

On 24 May 1778, Boyne, under the command of captain Herbert Sawyer, was sent to the Leeward Islands, where on 15 December, she took part in the Battle of St Lucia. A large fleet and transports from Barbados arrived at Grand Cul de Sac bay on the French held island on 12 December and, over the following two days, landed 5,000 troops. On 14 December, a French fleet under Comte D'Estaing appeared. The British adopted a defensive stance and as part of the preparations, 12 of Boyne's 32-pounder guns were hauled up from her lower deck and placed on shore. The British formed their ships in line across the bay, with the transports behind, and aided by shore batteries, were twice able to repulse French attacks on 15 December. The following day d'Estaing took his force north to Gross Islet bay where he landed 7,000 soldiers but British troops had already marched there and occupied the high ground. The French were forced to re-embark and, after d'Estaing's fleet left on 29 December, the island surrendered to the British.

On 6 July 1779, Boyne took part in the Battle of Grenada, where a frigate and 21 British ships-of-the-line under vice-admiral John Byron engaged d'Estaing's French fleet of 34 ships of which 25 were of-the-line. While the British ships were away on escort duty, d'Estaing, attacked and captured the island of St Vincent on 18 June. Admiral Byron had heard of the loss and was on his way to retake the island when he received news that the French had since also taken Grenada. He immediately abandoned his plan and turned his fleet towards Grenada. Of his twenty-one ships-of-the-line, Byron initially left three to guard the convoy and, hoping to attack quickly before the French had time to assemble, sent the remainder on a general chase of the enemy fleet as it left its anchorage. Fifteen of the French ships had already formed line-of-battle when the three leading British ships, HMS Sultan, HMS Prince of Wales and Boyne arrived. Far ahead of the rest. they endured the brunt of the French fire, while being unable to bring their own guns to bear. The remainder of the British fleet engaged in a disorganised fashion and, outnumbered, was badly mauled. Boyne suffered 12 killed and 30 wounded in the action.

The recently promoted Charles Cotton assumed command in 1780 and on 17 April, took Boyne into battle off Martinique. The Comte de Guichen had left Martinique on 13 April with 23 ships-of-the-line. He was spotted and pursued by George Brydges Rodney fleet of 20 ships, which included Boyne, on 16 April. By late morning the following day, after some manoeuvring, Rodney gave the order to engage. The signal he issued was supposed to have been read in conjunction with an earlier signal identifying the enemy's rear as the point of attack but this was not understood by his captains who attacked the French van. The resulting conflict was indecisive and both fleets retired. The two fleets encountered each other again on 15 May, and again on 19 May, with inconclusive results. The French then returned to Fort Royal and the British to St. Lucia.

In November, Boyne returned home, where she was fitted for ordinary at Plymouth. In May 1783, she was broken up.
