= Burford-class ship of the line =

Class overview
- Name: Burford
- Operators: Royal Navy
- In service: 1757–1785
- Completed: 3
- Retired: 3

General characteristics
- Type: 68-gun third-rate ship of the line
- Tons burthen: 1,426 87/94 (bm)
- Length: 162 ft 1 in (49.4 m) (gundeck)
- Beam: 44 ft 8 in (13.6 m)
- Depth of hold: 19 ft 8 in (6.0 m)
- Propulsion: Sails
- Sail plan: Full-rigged ship
- Complement: 520
- Armament: 68 muzzle-loading, smoothbore guns: Lower gundeck: 26 × 32 pdr guns; Upper gundeck: 28 × 18 pdr guns; Forecastle: 2 × 9 pdr guns; Quarter deck: 12 × 9 pdr guns

Scale plan of the HMS Dorsetshire, a Burford-class ship

The Burford class were three 68-gun third-rate ships of the line designed for the Royal Navy by Sir Joseph Allin. The Burford ships were almost the last "70-gun" (in practice 68-gun) ships designed by Allin. They were built to the draught specified by the 1745 Establishment as amended in 1754.

== Ships ==
- HMS Burford

Builder: Chatham Dockyard
Ordered: 15 January 1754
Laid down: 30 October 1754
Launched: 5 May 1757
Fate: Sold to be broken up, 1785

- HMS Dorsetshire

Builder: Portsmouth Dockyard
Ordered: 15 January 1754
Laid down: 22 June 1754
Launched: 13 December 1757
Fate: Broken up, 1775

- HMS Boyne

Builder: Plymouth Dockyard
Ordered: 13 May 1758
Laid down: 9 August 1758
Launched: 31 May 1766
Fate: Broken up, 1783
