= HMS Sartine =

French merchant vessel

History

France
- Name: Sartine
- Namesake: Antoine de Sartine (French statesman)
- Builder: Bordeaux
- Laid down: c. September 1775
- Launched: 1776
- Acquired: 1778 by requisition
- Captured: 25 August 1778

Great Britain
- Name: HMS Sartine
- Acquired: 25 August 1778
- Commissioned: 2 February 1779
- Fate: Foundered 26 November 1780

General characteristics
- Displacement: 550 tons
- Tons burthen: 80218/94 (bm)
- Length: 132 ft 6 in (40.4 m) (overall); 118 ft 0 in (36.0 m) (keel)
- Beam: 35 ft 9 in (10.9 m)
- Depth of hold: 15 ft (4.6 m)
- Sail plan: Full-rigged ship
- Complement: Merchantman: 40 men British service: 200 men
- Armament: Merchantman: 12 × 12-pounder guns + 6 swivel guns; French service: 26 × 8-pounder guns + 6 swivel guns.; British service: Gun deck: 26 × 9-pounder guns; QD & Fc: 6 × 6-pounder guns

HMS Sartine was a French merchant vessel from Bordeaux. The French Navy pressed her into service on 3 August 1778 to assist in the defense of Pondichéry. The British captured her during the Siege of Pondicherry (1778), and took her into service under her existing name. HMS Sartine foundered in action off Calicut in November 1780.

== Career ==
In 1775 the shipowner Jacques-Alexandre Laffon de Ladebat (1719–97) decided to finance an expedition to the East Indies in order to take advantage of the opportunity presented by a relaxation of the monopoly on the trade hitherto awarded to the French East India Company at Lorient. He commissioned the construction of a vessel in 1775, the Sartine which left France on 19 September 1776 with instructions to sell her cargo on the Malabar coast, pick up a cargo for China, there pick up a cargo of silks and other textiles for France, and return in 1778. Sartine reached Colombo on 2 February 1777. From there she sailed to Cochin, Mahé, Mangalore, Goa, Surat and Chaoul, then an important trading port about 30 kilometers south of Bombay. On 24 August she sailed for China via Ceylon and the Strait of Malacca. Hurricane damage in October forced Sartine to abandon the voyage to China and instead to return to Malacca for repairs. By 14 January 1778 Sartine was at Pondicherry. From there she made a trading voyage to Karaikal, like Mahé and Pondichéry a French colony. After her return to Pondichéry, the French government requisitioned Sartine and armed her for the defense of the colony against the British.

On 10 August 1778, Sartine was part of a squadron under Tronjoly, which consisted of the 64-gun ship of the line Brillant, the frigate Pourvoyeuse and three smaller ships, Sartine, Lawriston, and Brisson. (Note: Like Sartine, the other two smaller ships were merchant vessels, pressed into service. Lauriston (or Lawriston or L'Oriston), had been built at Rangoon, was of 1000 tons, and was armed with 22 or 26 guns. She was returned to merchant service in June 1781 at Île de France but again requisitioned in December 1781. The British captured her in February 1782. Brisson was a merchant vessel from Lorient, of about 650–700 tons, and armed with twenty 8-pounder guns. The French requisitioned her in July 1778 for the defense of Pondichéry, where the British captured her in October 1778.) The French encountered Admiral Edward Vernon's squadron, consisting of Rippon (Vernon's flagship), Coventry, Seahorse, Cormorant, and the East India Company's ship Valentine, early on the morning. An inconclusive action followed for about two hours in mid-afternoon. The French broke off the action and the British vessels were too damaged to be able to catch them up again. In the action the British suffered 11 men killed and 53 wounded.

Seahorse captured Sartine on 25 August 1778. Sartine had been patrolling off Pondichéry with Pourvoyeuse when they sighted two East Indiamen, which were sailing blithely along, unaware of the outbreak of war. The French ships gave chase lazily. Sartine's captain, Du Chayla, first had to be roused from his bed ashore. The British merchant vessels escaped, but Sartine came too close to Vernon's squadron. Vernon sent Coventry and Seahorse to engage Sartine. Brisson sailed to support Sartine, but Valentine intercepted Brisson, which retreated. Sartine then surrendered after a short action. Barras accused her of surrendering to a frigate of her own size without a fight. All four Royal Navy vessels in Vernon's squadron shared in the prize money. (Vernon had already sent Valentine off with dispatches.) Tronjoly, as commander of the French squadron, and his deputy, Saint-Orens, captain of Pourvoyeuse, were criticized for not engaging Vernon and Rippon, despite orders from Guillaume-Léonard de Bellecombe, governor of Pondicherry, to do so.

The Royal Navy took Sartine into service as the fifth-rate frigate Sartine. She was commissioned on 10 February 1779 under Captain Alexander M'Coy. After his death, Captain Robert Simonton took command in 1780.

== Fate ==
She was lost off Mangalore on 26 November 1780. The British were at war with Hyder Ali, Sultan of Mysore, and Vernon wanted to destroy Hyder Ali's small navy. When the squadron arrived off Callicut Road on 24 November a distant, ineffective engagement ensued. Although the British captured one of Hyder Ali's vessels, the remainder were anchored close to shore. Vernon ordered Simonton to lighten Sartine and move her closer. Simonton, noting that Sartine was already in only three fathoms, was not enthused, but followed orders and by the afternoon she was anchored in shallow water. However, it then became apparent that she was aground. By the afternoon of the next day she was gotten off after her crew threw some of her guns overboard. When she anchored in deeper water it was found that she was taking on water. Efforts were made on the 26th to stop the leaks, but they were futile. She flooded and was irrecoverable. Some of her sails, masts, and stores were rescued. The subsequent court martial absolved Simonton of all blame.

== Post script ==
After the British captured Pondicherry, and after the negotiation of an exchange of prisoners, some of the French officials and troops from Pondicherry left in a cartel named Sartine. One of the officers was the Comte de Barras, the commander of the French regiment of Marine Infantry of Pondichéry.

Some French accounts conflate this Sartine with HMS Sartine, though the key French sources on the corvette that the British captured do not. On 1 May 1780 the cartel Sartine was six leagues south of Cape St Vincent when she encountered the 50-gun HMS Romney. Due to a misunderstanding, Romney fired on Sartine, killing Captain Dallés and two other men aboard her. (Note: Barras states that Sartine was flying cartel signals at her topmasts, and French colours at the aft; when he realised this, he struck the French colours and Romney immediately ceased fire.) Romney then sent a boat to Sartine, and after verifying that she was a cartel, permitted her to proceed. Sartine then went into Cadiz. From there she sailed to Marseille, where due to the lack of skill of the replacement for Dallés, she grounded at the harbour entrance. M. Pléville, commander of the port, managed to have Sartine towed to the dock. The grounding gave rise to the French saying, "C'est la sardine qui a bouché le port de Marseille" ("It was the sardine that choked the port of Marseille").
