= Louis-Bernard Saint-Orens =

French naval officer of the War of American Independence

Louis-Bernard Saint-Orens (Saintonge, 1733 — Isle de France (Mauritius), 9 September 1780) was a French Navy officer. He notably captained the 40-gun frigate Pourvoyeuse at the outbreak of the Anglo-French War in 1778.

== Biography ==
Saint-Orens joined the Navy as a Garde-Marine on 6 July 1750. He was promoted to Ensign on 11 October 1755, and to Lieutenant on 1 May 1763.

In 1764, Saint-Orens was in command of the 16-gun corvette Isis. She was part of a division bound for the Caribbean, along with the 32-gun frigate Danaé, under Kearney. That same year, Admiral d'Estaing sent him to cover the Turks and Caicos Islands.

In 1777, Saint-Orens served as a Lieutenant on the 32-gun frigate Dédaigneuse. He was promoted to Captain on 4 May 1777, and that same year was given command of the heavy 40-gun frigate Pourvoyeuse, at Rochefort.

In 1778, Saint-Orens was stationed at Pondicherry with Pourvoyeuse, along with the 64-gun Brillant, under Tronjoli, and three armed merchantmen: the 26-gun corvette Sartine (under du Chayla), the 24-gun Brisson (under Captain du Chézeau), and the 24-gun Lawriston. During the Siege of Pondicherry in 1778, Tronjoli had lost some of his ships and escaped to Isle de France with the survivors, arriving there in late September. He was tasked with patrolling off Cape Agulhas.

In early October 1778, Pourvoyeuse captured the Danish merchantman Enighed, mistaking her for British. On 8 October, he sent her to Port-Louis with a prize crew under first officer Périer de Salvert.

On 21 February 1779, he captured the East Indiaman Osterley, helped by the armed merchantman Elisabeth.

Funds from the sale of the cargo were embezzled, leading to a heated dispute. Tronjoli demanded that Saint-Orens explain himself. On 9 September 1780, the day before he was to testify before the authorities, Saint-Orens was founded dead, officially from an aneurism, although rumour said that he had been mortally wounded in a sword duel with a M. Villeneuve, formerly a Counselor at Pondichéry.
