= D'Estienne d'Orves =

D'Estienne d'Orves (French pronunciation: [dɛstjɛn dɔʁv]) may refer to:

- Several members of the Estienne Family, among whom:
  - Thomas d'Estienne d'Orves (1727–1782), Navy officer
  - Henri Honoré d'Estienne d'Orves (1901–1941), Navy officer and hero of the French Resistance
  - Nicolas d'Estienne d'Orves (born 1974), a French journalist
- D'Estienne d'Orves-class aviso, a warship class named in honour of Henri Honoré d'Estienne d'Orves
