= HMS Rippon (1758) =

Ship of the line of the Royal Navy

History

Great Britain
- Name: HMS Rippon
- Ordered: 8 November 1752
- Builder: Woolwich Dockyard
- Launched: 20 January 1758
- Fate: Broken up, 1808

General characteristics
- Class & type: 1752 amendments 60-gun fourth rate ship of the line
- Tons burthen: 1242 (bm)
- Length: 155 ft (47.2 m) (gundeck)
- Beam: 42 ft 5 in (12.9 m)
- Depth of hold: 18 ft 7 in (5.7 m)
- Propulsion: Sails
- Sail plan: Full-rigged ship
- Armament: Gundeck: 24 × 24-pounder guns; Upper gundeck: 26 × 12-pounder guns; QD: 8 × 6-pounder guns; Fc: 2 × 6-pounder guns

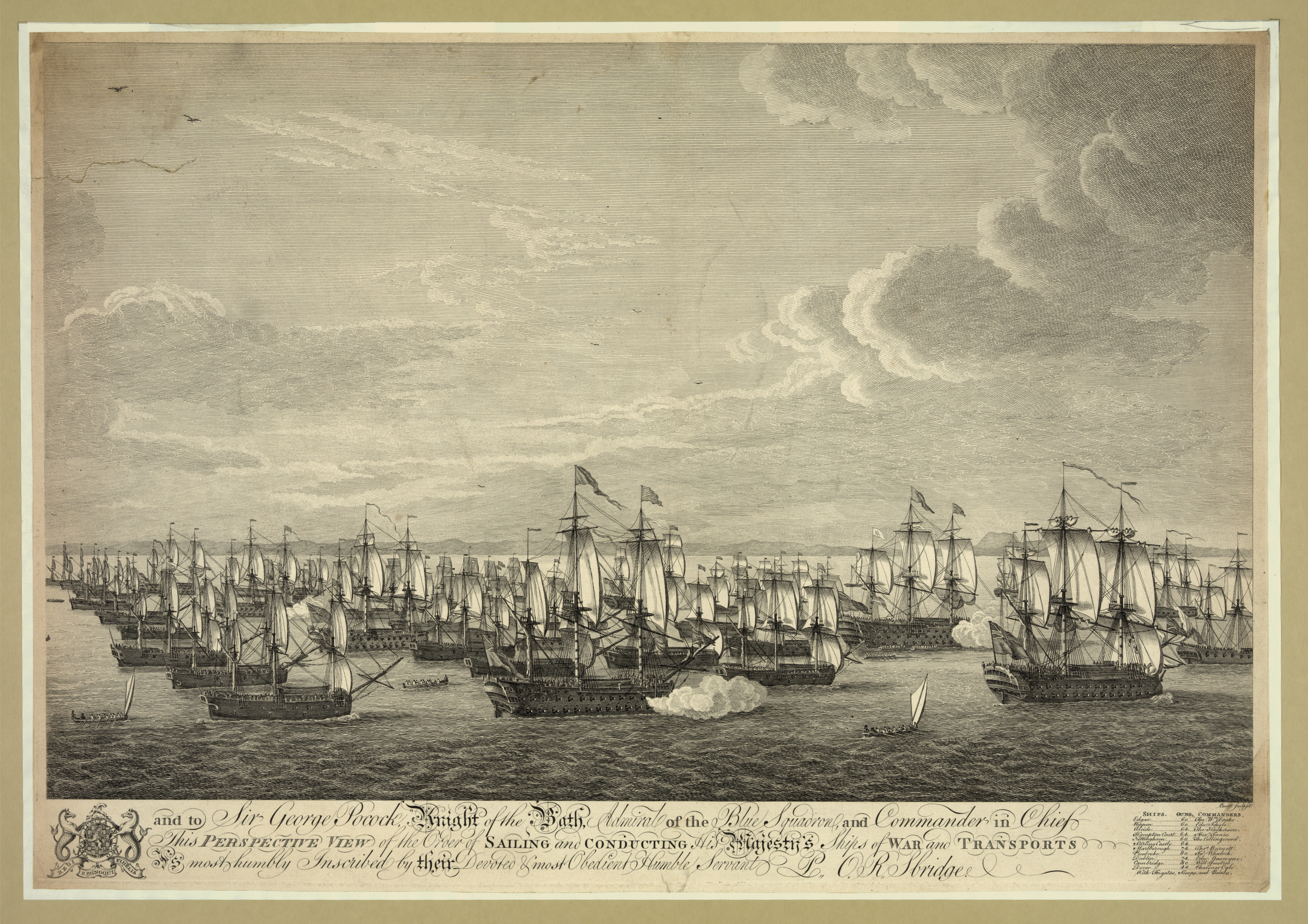
Shown here as a member Sir George Pocock's Blue Squadron, circa 1762

HMS Rippon was a 60-gun fourth rate ship of the line of the Royal Navy, designed by Sir Joseph Allin and built by Israel Pownoll at Woolwich Dockyard to the draught specified by the 1745 Establishment as amended in 1752, and launched on 20 January 1758.

== Career ==
Under Captain Edward Jekyll, Rippon took part in the unsuccessful attack on Martinique in January 1759. While patrolling off Brest on 10 March 1761, Rippon chased and engaged the French ship of the line Achille, suffering heavy losses when a gun exploded during the action. This allowed Achille to pull away and the French ship subsequently escaped.

Early on the morning of 10 August 1778, Sir Edward Vernon's squadron, consisting of Rippon (Vernon's flagship), Coventry, Seahorse, Cormorant, and the East India Company's ship Valentine, encountered a French squadron under Admiral François l'Ollivier de Tronjoly which consisted of the 64-gun ship of the line Brillant, the frigate Pourvoyeuse and three smaller ships, Sartine, Lawriston, and Brisson. An inconclusive action followed for about two hours in mid-afternoon. The French broke off the action and the British vessels were too damaged to be able to catch them up again. In the action the British suffered 11 men killed and 53 wounded, including four men killed and 15 wounded aboard Rippon.

Seahorse captured Sartine on 25 August 1778. Sartine had been patrolling off Pondichery with Pourvoyeuse when they sighted two East Indiamen, which were sailing blithely along, unaware of the outbreak of war. The French vessels gave chase lazily. Sartine's captain, Count du Chaillar, first had to be roused from his bed ashore. The British merchant vessels escaped, but Sartine came too close to Vernon's squadron. He sent Coventry and Seahorse after her and she surrendered after a short action. A French account remarks acidly that she surrendered to a frigate of her own size without a fight. All four Royal Navy vessels in Vernon's squadron shared in the prize money. (Vernon had already sent Valentine off with dispatches.) The Royal Navy took Sartine into service as the fifth-rate frigate HMS Sartine.

== Fate ==
Rippon was placed on harbour service in 1801, and was eventually broken up in 1808.
