= Action of 12 August 1782 =

Naval action that opposed the French frigate Bellone to the British HMS Coventry

- Part of the American Revolutionary War
Date	12 August 1782
Location	Off Batticaloa
Result	Indecisive

Belligerents
France	Great Britain

Commanders and leaders
Antoine Melchior Gaspard de Bernier de Pierrevert †	Andrew Mitchell

Strength
One heavy frigate	One light frigate; 200 men; troops

Casualties and losses
60 killed and wounded	26 killed, 29 wounded

The action of 12 August 1782 was a minor single-ship action that opposed the French 32-gun frigate Bellone to the British 28-gun HMS Coventry in the run-up to the Battle of Trincomalee. Although both ships were frigates, Bellone belonged to the Iphigénie class and was a comparatively large frigate for her time, carrying a battery of 18-pounder long guns, while Coventry was a sixth-rate armed only with 9-pounder long guns. Furthermore, Bellone had the advantage of the wind. The nominal crew of Coventry was about tho thirds of that of Bellone, but in the occasion it was reinforced by the troops she was carrying. In spite of these overwhelming odds, Coventry managed to inflict heavy casualties on Bellone, and most decisively to shoot most of the senior staff. The resulting confusion on Bellone allowed Coventry to escape to Madras.

== Background ==
The War of American Independence triggered an Anglo-French War from 1778 and, by extension, a Fourth Anglo-Dutch War from 1780 when the Dutch Republic refuse to stop trading with enemies of Britain. This aligned French and Dutch interests in the Indian Ocean theatre. France had a base of operation at Isle de France (Mauritius) and was allied with Hyder Ali, while the Dutch were holding the Dutch Cape Colony. France sent convoys escorted by ships of the line to reinforce these outpost.

The French consolidated squadrons from Pondicherry, Isle de France and those escorting the convoys into a force numbering 15 ships of the line and several frigates, first under Estienne d'Orves and, after he died, under Suffren. This fleet was opposed to an equivalent British force under Admiral Edward Hughes. In August 1782, Suffren and Hughes had already fought three inconclusive actions at Sadras on 17 February 1782, Providien on 12 April and Negapatam on 6 July, and were positioning for their fourth encounter at Trincomalee, that was to flare up on 25 August and last until 3 September.

In late July, Suffren's squadron was at Cuddalore for a high-level meeting with Hyder Ali in neighbouring Bahour. Suffren sent his light ships to recon Trincomalee; informed that the British fleet was not in harbour, he decided to sail there himself and land troops and attempt to conquer the city. The French squadron left Cuddalore on 2 August 1782 and progressed towards Batacalo.

Suffren detached Bellone with orders to sail first and Batacalo and then Galle, where French captain Aymar was waiting for him with the 74-gun Illustre, the 64-gun Saint Michel and 8 transports carrying troops and supplies. Bellone had a new captain, Pierrevert, who was a nephew to Suffren; he had replaced the former captain, Jean André de Pas de Beaulieu, promoted to the command of the 64-gun Brillant during Suffren's reshuffling of his captains in the wake of the Battle of Negapatam.

== Battle ==
On 12 August, as the French squadron had arrived at Batacalo and was anchored in the bay, HMS Coventry sailed in the South-East of the harbour, ferrying troops to Madras. Vengeur and Artésien attempted to chase to investigate, but soon lost contact and returned to the fleet.

Meanwhile, Bellone had her mainmast damaged by a gust of wind off Ceylon and was sailing to Batacalo for repairs. The two ships met near Friar's Hood. Bellone had the advantage of the wind and was a much stronger frigate than Coventry. However, Pierrevert made the mistake of stopping his frigate and letting Coventry approach, allowing Mitchell to close to pistol range and open fire with grapeshot and musketry. This caused heavy casualties on Bellone, and soon mortally wounded Pierrevert himself.

As the first officer took over, second officer Boucher started arguing that he was the one who should take command, due to a regulation barring foreigners to command French warships, and since the first officer was of Italian origin. As they argued, fire from Coventry killed Boucher and gravely wounded the first officer. The third officer took over but, lacking experience, he failed to gain the confidence of his crew and was unable to prevent Coventry's escape. Bellone sustained 60 men killed or wounded.

== Aftermath ==
The battle lasted 2 hours, killing or wounding about 60 French and 50 British. (Note: Cunat quotes Mitchell's report as mentioning 26 killed 29 wounded. Kippis gives a figure of 15 killed instead) Coventry, her rigging badly damaged, limped back to Madras. Hughes had hoped to set sail around 15 August, but it was not until 22 that he was ready to depart. The delay allowed Suffren to lay siege to Trincomalee, where Fort Ostenburg fell on 30.

Suffren restored Beaulieu as captain of Bellone, and replaced him on Brillant with Lieutenant de Kersauson.

Coventry would eventually be captured on 12 January 1783, when her new captain, William Wolseley, mistook four French ships of the line for British East Indiamen.

== See also ==
- Action of 14 December 1798, a similarly unbalanced action between the French 24-gun corvette Bayonnaise and the British 32-gun frigate Ambuscade. Bayonnaise managed to capture Ambuscade.
