= Antoine Melchior Gaspard de Bernier de Pierrevert =

French Navy officer

Antoine Melchior Gaspard de Bernier de Pierrevert (Château de Pierrevert Sisteron, 6 January 1754 — Bellone, off Batacalo, 3 September 1782) was a French Navy officer. He was nephew to Suffren and brother to Louis Jérôme Charles François de Bernier de Pierrevert.

== Biography ==
Bernier de Pierrevert was born to Euphrosine Madeleine de Suffren de Saint-Tropez and Paul Auguste de Bernier de Pierrevert.

In July 1782, in the wake of the Battle of Negapatam, Suffren reshuffled several of his captains. Beaulieu, captain of Bellone, was promoted to the 64-gun Brillant. To replace him, he appointed Bernier de Pierrevert.

On 12 August 1782, in the runup to the Battle of Trincomalee, Bellone had her mainmast damaged by a gust of wind and sailed to Batacalo for repairs. En route, she encountered HMS Coventry, under Andrew Mitchell. The action of 12 August 1782 ensued. In its opening, Bernier de Pierrevert was struck by a bullet and killed.

== Sources and references ==
Notes

Bibliography

- Cunat, Charles (1852). Histoire du Bailli de Suffren. Rennes: A. Marteville et Lefas. p. 447.

External links

- "Louis Jérôme Charles François de BERNIER Marquis de PIERREVERT". Parcours de vie dans la Royale.
