= William Wolseley =

William Wolseley may refer to:

- William Wolseley (brigadier-general) (1640–1697), English army officer
- William Wolseley (Royal Navy officer) (1756–1842), Royal Navy officer

== See also ==
- Wolseley baronets
