= Osterley (1771 EIC ship) =

History

Great Britain
- Name: Osterley
- Namesake: Osterley Park (Note: Osterley Park was the home of the Child family, owners of Child & Co., a private bank that financed EIC voyages and ships.)
- Owner: William Dent
- Operator: British East India Company
- Builder: Wells, Deptford
- Launched: 9 October 1771
- Captured: 21 February 1779

France
- Name: Osterley
- Out of service: January 1783.

General characteristics
- Tons burthen: 75888/94, or 775, or circa 800 (tons (French); "of load") (bm)
- Length: Overall:138 ft 10 1/2 in (42.3 m); Keel:114 ft 4 in (34.8 m)
- Beam: 36 ft 2 1/4 in (11.0 m)
- Depth of hold: 14 ft 5 in (4.4 m)
- Sail plan: Full-rigged ship
- Armament: 24 to 26 guns

Osterley was an East Indiaman launched on 9 October 1771 by Wells, Deptford. She made two voyages for the British East India Company (EIC) before the French frigate Pourvoyeuse captured her on 21 February 1779 while she was on her third voyage. She then sailed for a few years as a French merchantman.

== Career ==
1st EIC voyage (1771–1773): Captain Francis Fortescue sailed from the Downs on 18 May 1772, bound for Bencoolen and China. Osterley reached Bencoolen on 18 May 1772, and arrived at Whampoa Anchorage on 1 August. Homeward bound, she crossed the Second Bar on 1 December, reached the Cape of Good Hope (the Cape) on 23 February 1783, St Helena on 13 March, and Ascension Island on 23 March, and arrived back at the Downs on 26 May.

2nd EIC voyage (1774–1776): Captain Fortescue sailed from the Downs on 26 December 1774, bound for St Helena and Bencoolen. Osterley reached St Helena on 11 March 1775 and Simon's Bay on 19 May before arriving at Bencoolen on 5 August. She then visited two ports on Sumatra (Manna on 10 November, (Note: Manna Point or Town, southeast of Bengkulu, on the west coast of Sumatra; now Mana (4.484947°S 102.899207°E).) and Pring on 27 November, (Note: Pring was a pepper port some 16 miles northwest of Manna Point.) before returning to Bencoolen on 24 December. Homeward bound, she was at St Helena again on 12 May 1776, and arrived back at the Downs on 17 August.

3rd EIC voyage (1778-capture): Captain Samuel Rogers sailed from Plymouth on 9 February 1778, bound for Madras and Bengal. British records give the date of her capture as 22 February 1779, suggesting that she was homeward bound at the time of her capture.

== Capture and fate ==
On 6 May 1779, Pourvoyeuse, under Captain Saint-Orens captured Osterley off Cape Agulhas, helped by the armed merchantman Elisabeth. (Note: Elizabeth had sailed from France in March 1777 as an armed ship with troops and stores for the Coromandel Coast. After her arrival, ostensibly the French governor at Pondicherry had seized and put her under Saint-Orens's command. There is, however, evidence that John Whitehill, the EIC's governor at Madras, was a secret part-owner of Elizabeth and that he conspired with the French to effect Osterley's capture.) In early June, Osterley, Pourvoyeuse, and Elisabeth arrived at Île de France (Mauritius).

Funds from the sale of the cargo were embezzled, leading to a heated dispute. Tronjoli, commander of the French forces in the Indian Ocean, demanded that Saint-Orens explain himself. The day before he was to testify before the authorities, Saint-Orens was found dead, officially from an aneurism, although rumour said that he had been mortally wounded in a sword duel with a M. Villeneuve, formerly a Counselor at Pondichéry.

After Tronjoly was recalled to France and transferred command of the French forces to Thomas d'Estienne d'Orves, he embarked on Osterley to return to Brest. He arrived in late April 1781.

She was sold as a merchant ship at Isle de France in January 1783. She continued to sail in the Indian Ocean until at least 1784.
