= HMS Seahorse (1748) =

Sixth-rate frigate of the Royal Navy

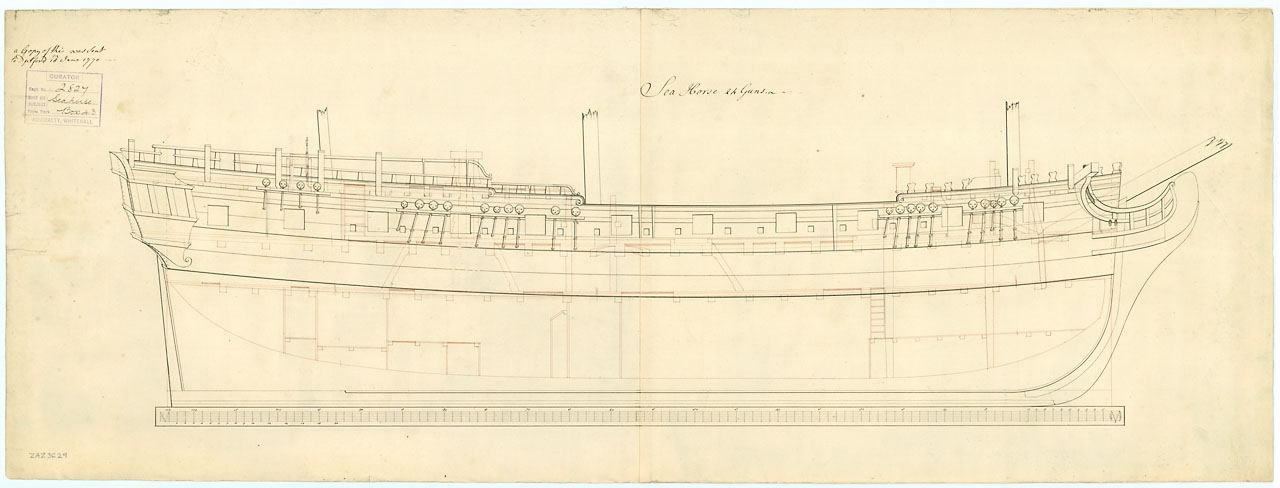
- Ship plan of Seahorse

History

Great Britain
- Name: HMS Seahorse
- Ordered: 4 February 1748
- Builder: John Barnard, Harwich
- Laid down: 23 February 1748
- Launched: 13 September 1748
- Commissioned: November 1748
- Fate: Sold on 30 December 1784

Great Britain
- Name: Ravensworth
- Namesake: Ravensworth
- Owner: 1784: Richard Buller; 1788: C. Herries & Co.
- Acquired: 1784 by purchase
- Fate: Sold 1789

France
- Name: Citoyen
- Acquired: 1789 by purchase
- Fate: Last listed 1801

General characteristics
- Class & type: Sixth-rate frigate
- Tons burthen: 5121/94, or 519 (bm)
- Length: Royal Navy; 114 ft 0 in (34.75 m) (overall); 95 ft 4 in (29.06 m) (keel); After rebuild; 115 ft 10 in (35.31 m) (overall); 92 ft 4 in (28.14 m) (keel)
- Beam: Royal Navy: 32 ft (9.8 m); After rebuild: 32 ft 3 1/2 in (9.843 m)
- Depth of hold: Royal Navy: 10 ft 2 in (3.10 m); After rebuild: 10 ft 2 in (3.10 m)
- Propulsion: Sails
- Sail plan: Full-rigged ship
- Complement: Royal Navy: 160; Citoyen: 160–224
- Armament: Royal Navy; Upper deck: 22 × 9-pounder guns; QD: 2 × 3-pounder guns; Citoyen; 1793; Upper deck: 22 × 8-pounder guns; Fc & QD: 8 × 4-pounder guns + 2 × 16-pounder carronades; 1800: 20 × 8-pounder + 6 × 4-pounder guns

HMS Seahorse was a 24-gun sixth-rate frigate of the Royal Navy, launched in 1748. She participated in four battles off the coast of India between 1781 and 1783. The Royal Navy sold her in 1784 and she then became the mercantile Ravensworth. She made one voyage for the British East India Company (EIC) between 1786 and 1788. In 1789, she was sold to the French East India Company which had her refitted and renamed her Citoyen. In 1793 the French Navy purchased her and used her as a frigate. She was last listed in 1801.

Horatio Nelson served as a midshipman aboard her in his early naval career.

== Construction and commissioning ==
Seahorse was ordered on 4 February 1748, with the contract being awarded to John Barnard, of Harwich, on 23 February 1748. Barnard laid her keel that very day and built her to a design by the Surveyor of the Navy Jacob Acworth. She was named Seahorse on 23 August, launched on 13 September 1748 and commissioned in November. She was completed on 17 February 1749 at Sheerness Dockyard, having cost £4,063.10.0d to build, and with a further £1,264.14.8d spent on fitting her out.

== Royal Navy career ==
Her first commander was Captain Samuel Barrington, who took over in November 1748, and sailed her to the Mediterranean in 1749. Seahorse was back in the English Channel in 1752, with Hugh Palliser replacing Barrington in April 1753. Seahorse then served initially in Home waters, before sailing to North America in January 1755. She returned to Britain in July that year, carrying the flag of Admiral Augustus Keppel.

Captain George Darby took command in 1756, and sailed from Britain bound for Newfoundland on 15 May 1756. Captain Thomas Taylor replaced Darby in March 1757. Under Taylor's command Seahorse was active in the North Sea, later fighting an engagement against two enemy frigates off Ostend, together with the sloops HMS Raven and HMS Bonetta.

Seahorse was then briefly under the command of acting Commander James Hackman from July 1758, before Captain James Smith took over command in October. Seahorse then left for North America on 14 February 1759, and spent the rest of the year at Quebec.

Seahorse was surveyed on 24 January 1760 and declared in need of repairs. A large repair was carried out at Deptford between March and August that year, at a cost of £5,765.19.8d.

She fought an action with the French 32-gun frigate L’Aigrette on 10 January 1761. Captain Charles Cathcart Grant replaced Smith later in the month.

She sailed for India on 4 February 1761 to observe the transit of Venus, and then moved to Manila until October 1762 in support of the Battle of Manila (1762).

Captain Robert Jocelyn took command in 1763, after which Seahorse returned to England and was paid off in June 1763. Further repairs were carried out in 1770, before she was recommissioned in January 1771 under Thomas Pasley. She sailed to the Leeward Islands in August that year.

In 1773 Digby Dent took command, before Seahorse was paid off to undergo another refit. She was recommissioned in August 1773 under George Farmer. Horatio Nelson was assigned to the ship as a midshipman through the influence of his uncle, Maurice Suckling. Also a midshipman aboard the Seahorse at this time was Thomas Troubridge, another future admiral.

Farmer sailed to the East Indies in November 1773. On 19 February 1775 Seahorse fought a battle with two of Hyder Ali's ketches off Anjengo. John Panton replaced Farmer in June 1777.

Early on the morning of 10 August 1778, Admiral Edward Vernon's squadron, consisting of Rippon (Vernon's flagship), Coventry, Seahorse, Cormorant, and the East India Company's ship Valentine, encountered a French squadron under Admiral François l'Ollivier de Tronjoly that consisted of the 64-gun ship of the line Brillant, the frigate Pourvoyeuse and three smaller ships, Sartine, Lawriston, and Brisson. An inconclusive action followed for about two hours in mid-afternoon. The French broke off the action and the British vessels were too damaged to be able to catch them up again. In the action the British suffered 11 men killed and 53 wounded; Seahorse alone lost three men killed and five wounded.

Seahorse captured Sartine on 25 August 1778. Sartine had been patrolling off Pondichery with Pourvoyeuse when they sighted two East Indiamen, which were sailing blithely along, unaware of the outbreak of war. The French vessels gave chase lazily. Sartine's captain, Count du Chaillar, first had to be roused from his bed ashore. The British merchant vessels escaped, but Sartine came too close to Vernon's squadron. He sent Coventry and Seahorse after her and she surrendered after a short action. A French account remarks acidly that she surrendered to a frigate of her own size without a fight. All four Royal Navy vessels in Vernon's squadron shared in the prize money. (Vernon had already sent Valentine off with dispatches.) The Royal Navy took Sartine into service as the fifth-rate frigate HMS Sartine.

By February 1779 Seahorse seems to have been under the command of Alexander M’Coy. Captain Robert Montagu took over command in March 1781, and under him Seahorse was present at the battles of Sadras on 17 February 1782, Providien on 12 April, Negapatam on 6 July, Trincomalee on 3 September, and Cuddalore on 20 June 1783. Charles Hughes took command in 1783, followed by John Drew in 1784.

=== Decommissioning and sale ===
Seahorse was paid off for the final time in March 1784. The Navy sold her on 30 December 1784, for the sum of £1,115, to Richard Buller.

== Merchantman ==
After Richard Buller purchased Seahorse, he had Randall, Gray and Brent, of Rotherhithe rebuild her as an East Indiaman, and renamed her Ravensworth.

=== EIC voyage (1786–1788) ===
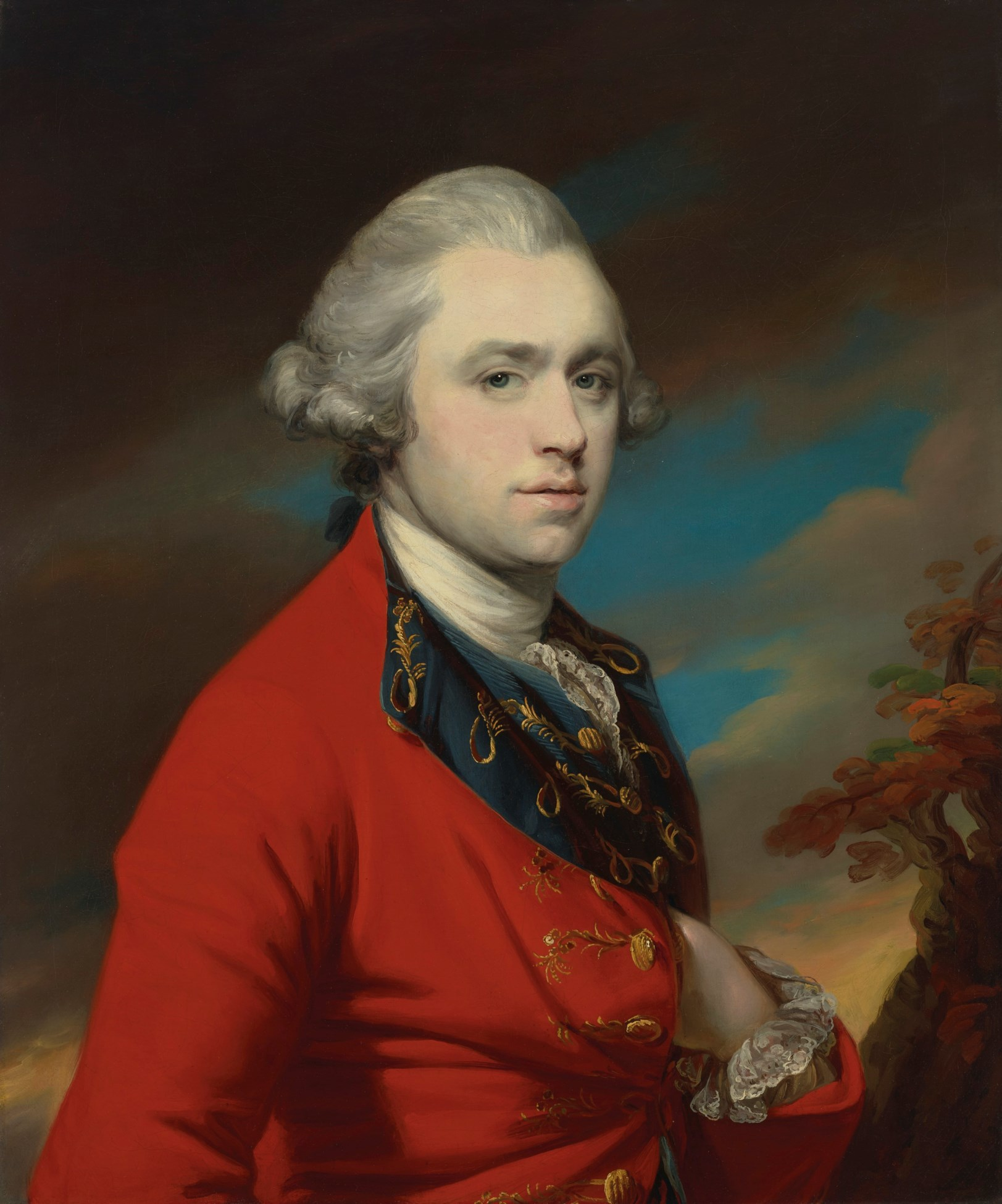
Collingwood Roddam, who captained Seahorse from 1786 to 1788

Her first voyage as a merchantman was under charter to the EIC as an "extra" ship. Under the command of Captain Collingwood Roddam she sailed to Madras, Bengal, and Bencoolen. Roddam left the Downs on 26 April 1786. Ravensworth reached Johanna on 27 July and Madras on 24 August, before arriving at Calcutta on 12 September. She passed Kedgeree on 30 January 1787, reached Penang on 19 February and Aceh on 4 March, before arriving at Benkulen on 25 March. On her return trip she reached Penang on 8 June, and arrived at Calcutta on 17 July. Homeward bound, she was at Diamond Point on 2 October. She reached the Cape on 29 December and St Helena on 28 January 1788, before arriving at the Downs on 30 March.

=== Subsequent career ===
On her return Buller sold Ravensworth to C. Herries & Co. Lloyd's Register for 1789 gives her master's name as "Drumond", and her trade as Cork-"l'ornt". The entries in Lloyd's Register continue essentially unchanged through 1793, though with her trade changing to London-"L'Ort", or Liverpool-"L'Ornt" (probably Lorient). Although Ravensworth is no longer listed in 1794, this apparently does not reflect her sale to French owners.

== French Indiaman ==
The French East India Company purchased Ravensworth in 1789 had her refitted at Bordeaux in 1789, and renamed her.

== French naval frigate ==
The French Navy purchased Citoyen in 1793.

On 1 September 1793, she captured the British Guineaman Golden Age. Two days later, Citoyen captured Courier. In October, Lloyd's List (LR) reported that the French privateer Citoyen had captured Courier, Rigby, master, as Courier was sailing for Liverpool from Africa and Jamaica. Citoyen plundered Courier and then ransomed her. Another source states that the French vessel was the frigate Citoyen, and that she had ransomed Courier for £300 from her captain. The report also stated that Citoyen had lost her captain and 63 men killed in an engagement with a British frigate and was under the command of her first lieutenant, an American. Twenty-seven men of her crew were Englishmen, calling themselves Americans. These captures may have occurred before the French Navy purchased Citoyen.

Citoyen was last listed in 1801.
