= C'est la sardine qui a bouché le port de Marseille =

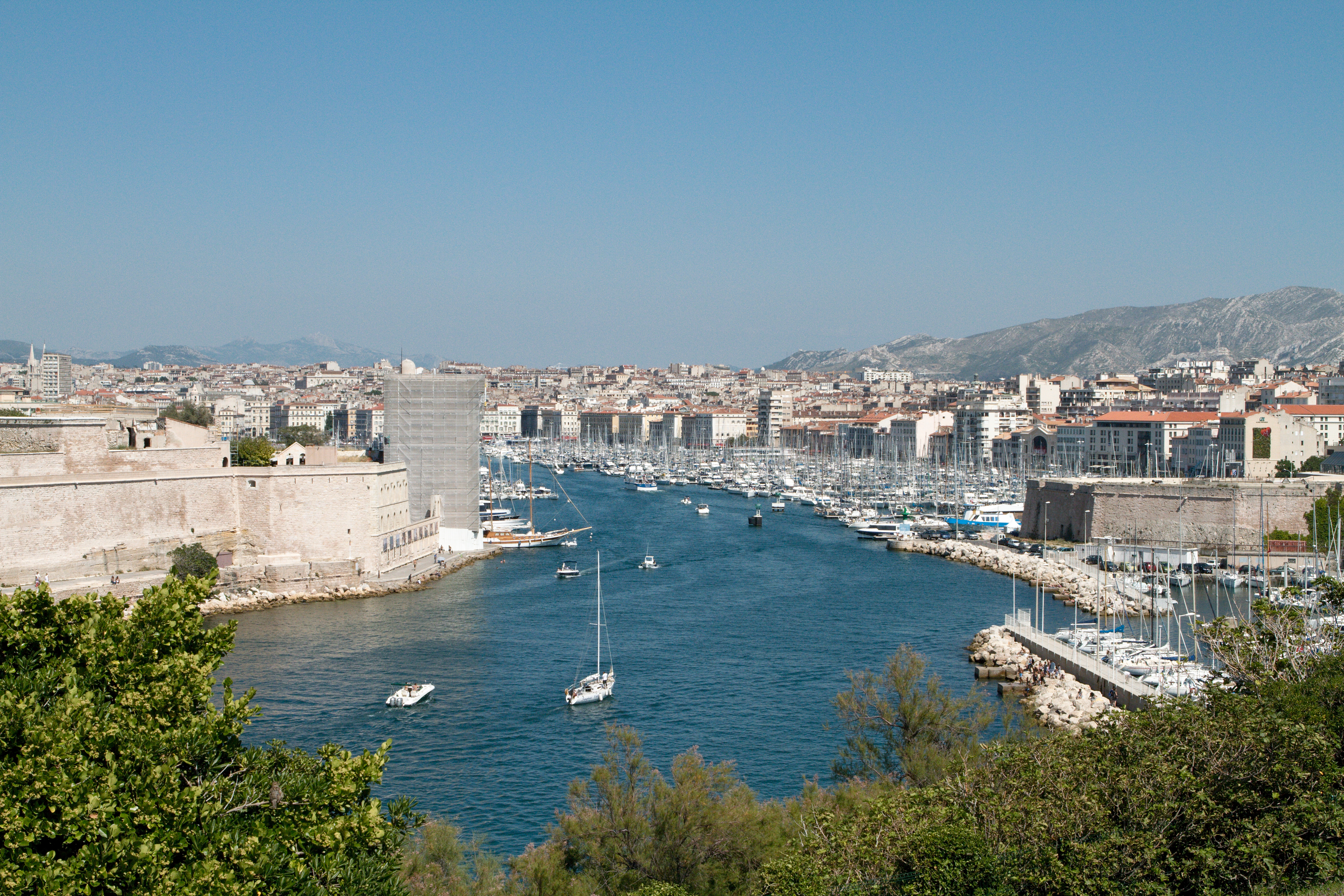
View of the entrance of Marseille harbour in 2011

"C'est la sardine qui a bouché le port de Marseille" ("The sardine that choked the port of Marseille") is a French popular expression dating back to the 18th century, and denoting the supposed tendency of the inhabitants of Marseille to exaggerate their discourse. The expression actually originates in a historical fact, when a ship named Sartine ran aground in the mouth of the harbour. As a meme, the story mutated the name into "sardine", French word for the European pilchard, and became a sarcasm.

== History ==
After the Siege of Pondicherry in 1778, a number of French troops were repatriated by cartel, including Paul Barras, who headed the Marine Infantry regiment there. A ship named Sartine (after Antoine de Sartine, then Minister of the Navy of Louis XVI), probably a merchantman, was chartered to ferry them back to France.

When the ship was about six leagues south of Cape St Vincent after a ten-month journey, on 1 May 1780, Sartine encountered the 50-gun HMS Romney. Due to a misunderstanding, Romney fired on Sartine, killing Captain Dallés and two other men aboard her. (Note: Barras states that Sartine was flying cartel signals at her topmasts, and French colours at the aft; when he realised this, he struck the French colours and Romney immediately ceased fire.) Romney sent a boat to Sartine, and after verifying that she was a cartel, permitted her to proceed. Sartine then went into Cadiz. From there she sailed to Marseille, where due to the lack of skill of the replacement for Dallés, she grounded at the harbour entrance, blocking it. Pléville, commander of the port, managed to have Sartine towed to the dock.

== Legacy ==
Léo Ferré uses the expression in this 1973 song Il n'y a plus rien.

== Notes and references ==
Notes

Citations

References

- Barras, Paul vicomte de (1895) Memoirs of Barras, member of the directorate. (Harper & brothers).
- Seuls les morts ne reviennent jamais : Les pionniers de la guillotine sêche en Guyane Française sous le Directoire de Philippe de Ladebat, Éditions Amalthée.
- Les mésaventures du vaisseau Le Sartine aux Indes Orientales (1776-1780)
