= Action of 15 January 1782 =

Naval engagement near Jamaica

- Part of American Revolutionary War
Date	15 January 1782
Location	off Jamaica
Result	British victory

Belligerents
Great Britain	Spain

Commanders and leaders
Thomas Windsor	Unknown

Strength
1 frigate	2 armed merchant frigates

Casualties and losses
2 killed 7 wounded	Both captured 41 killed & wounded 205 captured

The action of 15 January 1782 was a minor naval engagement that occurred near the island of Jamaica during the American Revolutionary War. A Royal Naval frigate, HMS Fox, intercepted and engaged two Spanish merchantmen of the Guipuzcoan Company of Caracas, one of 26 guns and the other of 20.

Fox was a 32-gun Active-class fifth-rate frigate commanded by Captain Thomas Windsor from 1781. While on a cruise near Jamaica, he saw two sail and then went to intercept; they were two small Spanish frigates and thus Windsor showed his colours.

The Spanish armed merchantmen, 26-gun Socorro Guipuzcoano and 20-gun Dama Vizcaína, tried to escape, but Fox overhauled them both. They engaged Fox for nearly an hour before finally striking the colors. Fox had one boatswain and one seaman killed, and seven others wounded.

The two Spanish ships had been bound to Havana, Cuba, from San Sebastián, Spain. The prizes were carried into Jamaica and the prize money was distributed accordingly, making Windsor and his crew rich men. For his action, Windsor was promoted and went on to command HMS Lowestoffe on 31 January.

Liverpool investors purchased one of the two prizes, named her Nancy, and sailed her to England. There she became the slave ship Golden Age.
