= Guillaume de Bellecombe =

French colonial Governor General (1728-1792)

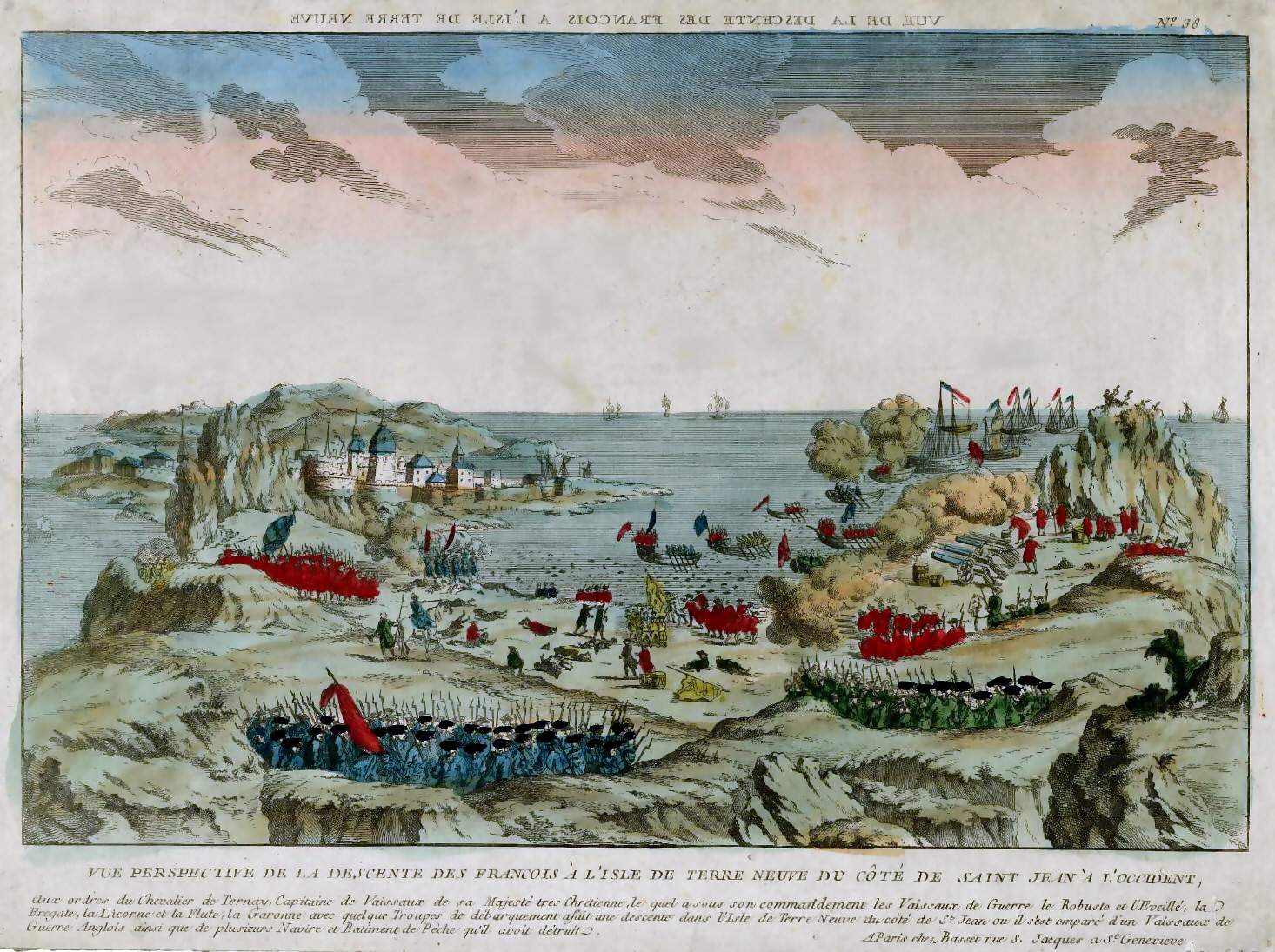
Perspective view of the French attack on Newfoundland near St. John's.

Guillaume Léonard de Bellecombe (20 February 1728 – 28 February 1792) was Governor General of Réunion, Saint-Domingue and Pondichéry, and a Republican revolutionary. According to most accounts he was born in 1728 in France.

Bellecombe engaged to Royal Roussillon and took part in French military expeditions overseas of the 2nd part of the 18th century. He had his last battles in New France (1755–1760) and a surprise expedition at St. John's, Newfoundland in 1762.

He was Governor of Saint-Domingue at the end of his career (1781–1785). Bellecombe helped start the revolution of the slaves which broke out soon in 1791. This event led to the creation of the Republic of Haiti in 1804.

Bellecombe retired to France in 1792 and died in the same year.

== Stages of life ==
Bellecomb was born February 20, 1728, in the hamlet of “Bellecombe”, in the commune of Perville.

He spent his youth in France. He entered the regiment of infantry of the Royal Roussillon Regiment in 1747. On March 30, 1755 he reached the rank of adjutant and on September 1, 1755 he attained the rank of captain.

He served as adjutant during the French and Indian War in Canada from 1756 to 1760. He became a Lieutenant-Colonel in 1761, and in 1762 he was second in command during the Newfoundland expedition and was wounded during the Battle of Signal Hill.

He was promoted to colonel on December 1, 1762. In 1763 he was adjutant in Martinique.

For 1767 to 1774, he was the orderly in Isle Bourbon (La Réunion), and became a Sergeant in 1770.

He married Angelique de Galaup de Marès.

In 1776 he was Commander Général in India, and Governor of Pondichéry. In 1778, when the American War of Independence reached India, Bellecombe was compelled to surrender Pondichéry to British forces after ten weeks of siege.

He received the rank of Brigadier and the decoration of Commander of Saint-Louis.

On July 13, 1781 he became Governor of Saint Domingue (Haiti). On August 25, 1783 he received the Grand Cross of Saint-Louis.

He spent 1785 to 1792 in retirement in France.

== Titles ==
Government offices
Preceded by Martin Adrien Bellier	Governor General of Réunion; 4 November 1767–4 October 1773	Succeeded by Jean-Guillaume Steinauer
Preceded by Jean Law de Lauriston	Gouverneur Général de l'Inde française January 1777–1782	Succeeded by Charles Joseph Pâtissier, Marquis de Bussy-Castelnau
Preceded by Jean-Baptiste de Taste de Lilancour (Acting)	Governor General of Haiti; 14 February 1782–3 July 1785	Succeeded by Gui Pierre de Coustard (Acting)
