= Sophie Adriansen =

French writer

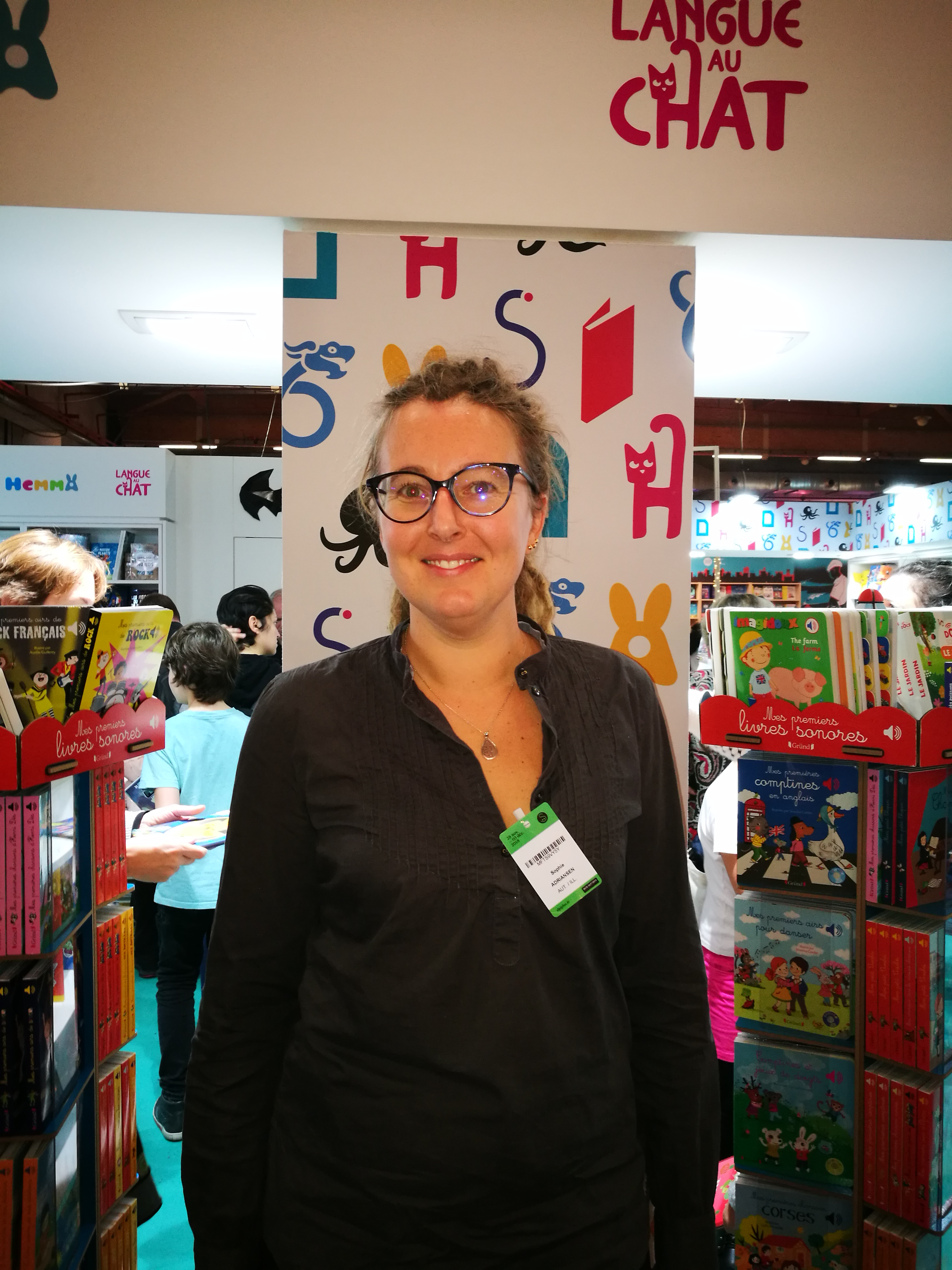
- Sophie Adriansen, Montreuil
- Born: 1982 (age 43–44); Orléans, France
- Occupation: Writer
- Writing career
- Genres: Novels, non-fiction, youth literature, short stories
- Notable works: Le Syndrome de la vitre étoilée, Les Grandes jambes, Max et les poissons

Sophie Adriansen (born 1982 in Orléans) is a French writer and a member of the Société des gens de lettres and the "Charte des auteurs et des illustrateurs jeunesse".

== Works ==
=== Novels ===
- 2016: Le Syndrome de la vitre étoilée, Paris, Fleuve noir, (ISBN 978-2-265-11568-2)
- 2013: Quand nous serons frère et sœur. Bordeaux: Éditions Myriapode. p. 220. ISBN 978-2-35945-019-4.
- 2012: Le grand numéro (Un meeting). Paris: Éditions Storylab. p. 100. ISBN 978-2-36315-077-6.
- 2012: Santé !. Paris: Éditions Storylab. p. 62. ISBN 978-2-36315-089-9.

==== Nonfiction ====
- 2016: Naître et grandir en musique – De la conception de l'enfant à son éveil musical. Paris: Éditions Télémaque. p. 160. ISBN 978-2-7533-0276-1., with Jean-Marie Leau
- 2014: Grace Kelly – D'Hollywood à Monaco, le roman d'une légende. Paris: Éditions Premium. p. 256. ISBN 978-2-35636-152-3.
- 2013: Mon sourire pour guérir - Sauvée par un veilleur de vie. Paris: Max Milo Éditions. p. 160. ISBN 978-2-31500-481-2., with Sandra Dal-Maso
- 2013: Louis de Funès – Regardez-moi là, vous !. Paris: Éditions Premium. p. 304. ISBN 978-2-35636-118-9.
- 2012: Trois années avec la SLA. Paris: Éditions de l'Officine. p. 160. ISBN 978-2-35551-152-3., with Jean-Paul Rouet
- 2010: Je vous emmène au bout de la ligne - Tribulations et secrets d'un conducteur de métro. Paris: Éditions Max Milo. p. 192. ISBN 978-2-31500-133-0., with Rodolphe Macia

=== Youth literature ===
- 2016: Les Grandes jambes, Slalom, 128 p. (ISBN 978-2-37554-002-2)
- 2015: Max et les poissons, Paris, Nathan, 96 p. (ISBN 978-2-09-255535-4)
- 2015: Drôles d'époques !, Nathan, hors série series "L’Énigme des vacances" n°42, 192 p. (ISBN 978-2-09-189248-1)
- 2015: Musiques diaboliques (Scooby-Doo), Nathan, series "L’Énigme des vacances" n°45, 96 p. ISBN 978-2091891590
- 2015: La menace des fantômes (Scooby-Doo), Nathan, series "L’Énigme des vacances" n°44, 96 p. (ISBN 978-2091891583)
- 2015: L'attaque des monstres animaux (Scooby-Doo), Nathan, series "L’Énigme des vacances" n°43, 96 p. (ISBN 978-2091891576)
- 2014: Drôles de familles !, Nathan, hors série series "L’Énigme des vacances" n°37, 192 p. (ISBN 978-2-09-187988-8)
- 2013: Le souffle de l'ange. L'Enigme des vacances. Paris: Nathan. pp. 120. ISBN 978-2-09-187975-8.
- 2012: J’ai passé l’âge de la colo !. Paris: Éditions Volpilière. p. 108. ISBN 978-2-91789-860-4.

=== Short stories ===
==== Collective collections ====
- 2013: Première loge in Les aventures du concierge masqué - L'Exquise Nouvelle saison 3, L'Exquise Édition, 260 p. (ISBN 978-29-54573-70-0)
- 2012: Sophie et Antonin in Les plus belles rencontres sur Facebook, Trinôme Éditions, 169 p. (ISBN 979-10-91626-01-9)
- 2012: Seules les mères et les chanteuses de pop in Temps additionnel, Éditions Antidata, 169 p. (ISBN 978-2-91928-504-4)
- 2011: Santé ! in Six façons de le dire, with David Foenkinos, Mercedes Deambrosis, Christophe Ferré, Nicolas d'Estienne d'Orves, Yasmina Khadra, Éditions du Moteur, 224 p. (ISBN 978-2-91860-220-0)
- Rendez-vous manqué (coup de cœur des libraires) in Rendez-vous, Éditions du Valhermeil

==== Literary magazines ====
- 2012: Frapper fort in Bordel n°6 [Foot], Stéphane Million éditeur
- 2012: Des adieux éphémères (cadavre exquis) in l’Ampoule n°3 [Gloire et oubli], Éditions de l’Abat-jour
- 2012: Jour de chance in Bordel n°15 [Made in China], Stéphane Million éditeur
- 2011: Dans le noir in Pr'Ose n°17 [Une île]
- 2011: Troisième visite in Dissonances n°20 [Maman]
