= Estienne Family =

House of Estienne
- Country: Kingdom of France
- Founded: 15th century

The House of Estienne is a French noble family from Provence. Its most illustrious member is Henri Honoré d'Estienne d'Orves, a French Navy officer, reputed "first martyr of Free France" and one of the major heroes of the French Resistance.

== History and branches ==
The house of Estienne is known since the 15th century. The family is divided in four main genealogical branches:

- the Lords of Orves,
- the Lords of Saint-Jean,
- the Lords of Bourguet,
- the Lords of Villemus.

== Notable members ==
- Nicolas d'Estienne d'Orves (b. 1974), French journalist and writer.
- Honoré d’Estienne d’Orves (1901–1941), Navy officer and Second World War hero.
- Louis-Jules d'Estienne du Bourguet (1771–1834), officer, mayor of Aix-en-Provence from 1815 to 1830.
- Jean-Baptiste d'Estienne du Bourguet (1760–1821), Navy officer and mathematician.
- Thomas d'Estienne d'Orves (1727–1782), French admiral.
- François d'Estienne (1549–1593), Lord of Saint-Jean de la Salle and Montfuron, President of the Parliament of Provence.
- François d'Estienne de Saint-Jean de Prunières, last bishop of Grasse (from 1753 to 1790).

== Coat of arms and motto ==
Image	Coat of arms
	d’Estienne de Villemus, du Bourguet et de Saint-Estève D'azur à une fasce d'or accompagnée de trois besants d'argent, deux en chef et un en pointe
	d’Estienne de Saint-Jean et d’Orves De gueules à la bande d’or, accompagnée en chef d’un gland d’or, vêtu, tigé et feuillé du même, et en pointe d’un besant aussi d’or; au chef cousu d’azur, chargé de trois étoiles d’or

- Mottos: Fluere desinet unquam; Folium non defluet unquam.
- Supporters: two golden griffins
- Crown: Marquis

== Derived names ==
- D'Estienne d'Orves-class aviso also known as the A69 type, it is a class of French Navy avisos
