= Pourvoyeuse-class frigate =

French Navy 1770s heavy frigate class

Class overview
- Name: Pourvoyeuse
- Operators: French Navy
- Succeeded by: Hébé class
- Planned: 2
- Completed: 2

General characteristics
- Type: Frigate
- Displacement: 1928 tonneaux
- Tons burthen: 840 port tonneaux
- Length: 50 m (164 ft 1 in)
- Beam: 12.3 m (40 ft 4 in)
- Draught: 6.3 m (20 ft 8 in)
- Armament: Main deck: 26 × 18-pounder guns; Forecastle: 12 × 8-pounder guns

The Pourvoyeuse class was a type of heavy frigate of the French Navy, designed in the 1770s by Louis Boux. The class comprise two units, Pourvoyeuse and Consolante, which served in the Indian Ocean and were involved in the naval operations of the American Revolutionary War, notably serving in the squadron of Admiral de Suffren.

They constituted one of the earliest attempts at building a frigate armed with 24-pounders on the artillery deck, rather than the 18-pounders typical of the day. The attempt was unfruitful, and the ships were commissioned armed with old 18-pounders. Several further such attempts were made later with the Résistance, Forte and Romaine classes. The concept was eventually perfected with the original six frigates of the United States Navy, before becoming moot with the introduction of a different artillery system based on 30-pounder long guns and 30-pounder short guns in the 1820s.

- Pourvoyeuse

Builder: Lorient
Ordered: 6 February 1772
Launched: 10 November 1772
Completed: 1773
Fate: Broken up

- Consolante

Builder: Lorient
Ordered:
Launched: 26 June 1775
Completed:
Fate:
