= Antoine Jacques Le Carlier d'Herlye =

Naval officer

Antoine Jacques Le Carlier d'Herlye (Brest, 3 January 1762 — Brest, 6 February 1840) was a French Navy officer. He fought in the War of American Independence, taking part in the French operations in the Indian Ocean under Suffren, and was one of the experts in the inquiry on the wreck of the frigate Méduse.

== Biography ==
Herlye joined the Navy in 1775 as a Garde-Marine. He was promoted to Ensign in 1776, and to Lieutenant in 1782.

On 12 January 1783, Herlye was given command of the recently captured Coventry. The same day, Coventrycaptured the East Indiaman Bland-Fort, which had escaped Fine a few days before.

Between 1783 and 1784, he was demoted to Ensign, but on 31 July 1784, he was promoted back to Lieutenant, and awarded a 400-Livre pension. In 1789, he was made a Knight in the Order of Saint-Louis.

Herlye was promoted to Captain in 1814, working first as under-Director of the harbour. In March 1817, Herlye was secretary in the inquiry on the wreck of the frigate Méduse. In 1818, he was promoted to Director of Brest harbour.

Herlye was made a Knight in the Legion of Honour on 28 April 1821.

== Sources and references ==
Notes

Bibliography

- Cunat, Charles (1852). Histoire du Bailli de Suffren. Rennes: A. Marteville et Lefas. p. 447.
- Corréard, Alexandre; Savigny, Jean-Baptiste-Henri (1821). Jugement du capitaine Hugues Duroy de Chaumareys. Paris: Corréard.
- Frankreich (1832). Bulletin des lois, 2e partie: Ordonnances, n°127 bis.

External links

- Société des Membres de la Légion d'Honneur. "ANTOINE JACQUES LE CARLIER D'HERLYE". Société des Membres de la Légion d'Honneur, Section du Finistère Nord.
