= Golden Age (1783 ship) =

History

United Kingdom
- Name: Golden Age
- Launched: 1779, Havana
- Acquired: 1783 by purchase of a prize
- Captured: 1 September 1793

France
- Name: Republican
- Acquired: 1794 by purchase of a prize

General characteristics
- Tons burthen: 360, or 377, or 399, or 400 (bm)
- Length: 108 ft 0 in (32.9 m)
- Beam: 28 ft 6 in (8.7 m)
- Complement: 50
- Armament: 1783: 6 × 6-pounder guns; 1793: 14 × 6-pounder guns
- Notes: Three decks and three masts

Golden Age was launched at Havana in 1779, almost certainly under another name. She was taken in prize circa 1783. From late 1783 she sailed from Liverpool as a slave ship in the triangular trade in enslaved people. She made four complete voyages. On her third her captives rebelled, but were unsuccessful. A French private frigate captured her in 1793 after she had disembarked her captives from her fifth enslaving voyage. Her captors took her into Philadelphia where she was sold to a French owner who named her Republican, and sailed her to France.

== Career ==
The prize that became Golden Age was condemned by the Court of Vice Admiralty at Jamaica on 25 March 1783. The vessel was one of two that Fox captured in the action of 15 January 1782. The two were the 26-gun Socorro Guipuzcoano and 20-gun Dama Vizcaína. Joseph Fayrer and Thomas Jolly purchased one of the two (which of the two is unknown as of January 2023), and named her Nancy. Nancy sailed to England. There, Fayrer organized a group of investors to purchase Nancy and fit her out for enslaving voyages. The owners renamed Nancy Golden Age. (Note: We owe this information to Lovejoy's attempt to discover the African origins of Juan Nepumceno Priieto, the subject of Lovejoy's biography.)

She first appeared in Lloyd's Register (LR), in 1783.

| Year | Master | Owner | Trade | Source & notes |
|---|---|---|---|---|
| 1783 | J. Farrer | Heywood | Liverpool–Africa | LR |

1st voyage transporting enslaved people (1783–1785): Captain Joseph Fayrer sailed from Liverpool on 15 October 1783. He acquired slaves at Ouidah; Golden Age arrived at Kingston on 25 November 1784, having stopped at Barbados on the way. She had embarked 650 captives and she had arrived with 503, for a 23% mortality rate on the Middle Passage between Africa and the West Indies.

Of the 503 captive sold, 237 unhealthy captives (47%), were sold at the end of the sale. The chief purchaser of the unhealthy captives was Alexandre Lindo, who purchased 144.

Golden Age sailed from Kingston on 29 January 1785 and arrived back at Liverpool on 11 April. She had left Liverpool with 50 crew members and had suffered six crew deaths on her voyage.

When Golden Age arrived at Kingston demand was strong; her 503 captives sold in two days. The firm of agents, Rainford, Blundell and Rainford, sold the captives for a total revenue £28,301, on which they earned a commission of £1,395. They also received a 5% commission on the amount they remitted to her owners; the agents' total commission was £2,543.

2nd voyage transporting enslaved people (1786–1787): Captain William Jackson sailed from Liverpool on 25 June 1786 with 40 crew members. He acquired captives at Bonny and arrived at Dominica on 1 December 1786 with 43 crew members, and 573 captives. (Note: The SlaveVoyages database has Golden Age arriving with 670 captives, but that is more likely to have been the number embarked. If she had embarked 670 captives and arrived with 573, that would represent a 14% mortality rate.) Golden Age arrived back at Liverpool on 27 February 1787. She had suffered 11 crew deaths on her voyage.

3rd voyage transporting enslaved people (1787–1788): Captain Jackson sailed from Liverpool on 13 July 1787. He acquired captives at Bonny. While Golden Age was on the African coast, her captives rose up in what proved to be an unsuccessful revolt. Captain Jackson ordered his crew to grind up pepper and ashes. He had them throw it in the eyes of the captives as they rushed the crew. Apparently the captain wished to end the uprising while limiting the loss of captives. Still, five captives were killed. (Note: Because she was not lost, she does not appear in Inikori.)

Golden Age arrived at Dominica on 25 February 1788. Golden Age had embarked 624 captives, and had arrived with 583, for a 7% mortality rate. She sailed for Liverpool on 31 March 1788 and arrived there on 21 May. She had left Liverpool with 50 crew members and had suffered seven crew deaths on her voyage.

Golden Age had platforms in the men's, boys', and women's rooms. The allocation of space was 45%, 18%, and 37%. Because the men were shackled together, they were allocated more space per person than the boys or women, who were not shackled, and so could be crowded together more closely.

| Year | Master | Owner | Trade | Source & notes |
|---|---|---|---|---|
| 1791 | J. Fayrer | T. Hinde | Liverpool–Africa | LR; good repair 1786, raised and good repair 1787, & repairs 1790 |

The Slave Trade Act 1788 (Dolben's Act) limited the number of enslaved people that British enslaving ships were allowed to transport without penalty, based on the ships' tons burthen. It was the first British legislation passed to regulate the shipping of enslaved people. At a burthen of 377 tons, the cap would have been 516 captives; at 399 tons, the cap would have been 538.

4th voyage transporting enslaved people (1790–1791): Captain Joseph Fayrer sailed from Liverpool on 16 August 1790. He acquired captives at Cape Coast Castle, Anomabu, and Popo. Golden Age arrived at Grenada in August 1791 with 536 captives. She arrived back at Liverpool on 14 November 1791. She had left Liverpool with 33 crew members and had suffered six crew deaths on her voyage.

6th voyage transporting enslaved people (1792–loss): Captain Fayrer acquired a letter of marque on 24 April 1793, shortly after the outbreak of war with France. Captain Fayrer sailed from Liverpool on 28 May 1792. He started embarking captives on 15 August 1792, at Ouidah.

Between 15 August and 31 December, Captain Fayrer acquired 152 male captives, and 92 female captives. At that point, the men had 15'7" square per person to sit and sleep in; women had 9'7" square. Over the next 109 days Fayrer acquired an additional 161 men and 85 women. By the time Golden Age the captives were so crowded that probably slept on their sides, unable to move.

Golden Age left Africa on 20 April 1793 and arrived at Kingston on 7 June. She had embarked 492 captives and she arrived with 484, for a mortality rate of 2%.

After the passage of Dolben's Act, masters received a bonus of £100 for a mortality rate of under 2%; the ship's surgeon received £50. For a mortality rate between two and three per cent, the bonus was halved. There was no bonus if mortality exceeded 3%. (Note: At the time the monthly wage for a captain of a slave ship out of Bristol was £5 per month.)

== Fate ==
In October 1793 Lloyd's List reported that the French frigate Citoyen had captured Golden Age, Fayrer, master, as Golden Age was on her way from Jamaica to Liverpool. It further reported that the second mate and six crew members had arrived at Plymouth. (Note: Fayrer survived. He died on 11 January 1801 while master of Annabella.) (Note: Two days later Citoyen captured Courier, Captain Rigby, which too was sailing from Jamaica to Liverpool. Citoyen plundered Courier before ransoming her to Rigby for £300. Earlier, Citoyen had reportedly met an English frigate. The subsequent engagement had cost Citoyen her captain and 63 men killed or mortally wounded. Citoyen's lieutenant was an American, and 27 of her crew were Englishmen, who called themselves Americans.) (Note: Courier, of 167 tons (bm), had been built at Boston in 1781. In 1793, she was a Guineaman on her first voyage transporting enslaved people. She was again captured in 1794 on her second voyage transporting enslaved people.)

The Treaty of Washington (1871) resulted in the settlement of a number of issues outstanding between the United States and the United Kingdom. The documentation of the claims and counter claims included a British listing of British vessels taken into American ports by their captors prior to 5 November 1794. The Neutrality Act of 1794 took effect on 5 June 1794. It made it illegal for U.S. citizens to wage war against any country at peace with the United States, such as by outfitting privateers that would then sail under foreign flags. It did permit the sale within the United States of prizes captured by foreign warships or privateers.

The British counter-claim showed Golden Age, Fayrer, master, being taken on 6 September and being brought into Philadelphia. It gave the name of her captor as Citoyen Francais de Marseilles. (The line below shows the brig Camilla being taken on 13 September and also brought into Philadelphia. The name of her captor was listed as Citoyen Francais de Bourdeaux.)

Golden Age was sold to a Captain Sautet (or Sautit). The vessel herself sold for $4,300, and her cargo for $24,412.52. (The cargo sold for much more than the amount declared to Customs.) Sautet renamed her Republican, and she left Philadelphia with Admiral Van Stabel's fleet. the fleet arrived at Brest on 13 June 1794, without having lost a vessel.

The British valued Golden Age at £20,000. (This listing gives the name of her captor simply as Citoyen.)

== Possible subsequent history ==
A French privateer named Republicain started operating out of Charleston in late 1794. She sent her first prize, a British brig named Eagle, into Charleston in September 1794. She captured numerous prizes around Havana that she sent into Charleston before Hussar and Scorpion arrived off Charleston on 25 October 1794, announcing that they had captured the French privateer Republican.
