= Mercedes Deambrosis =

Spanish writer

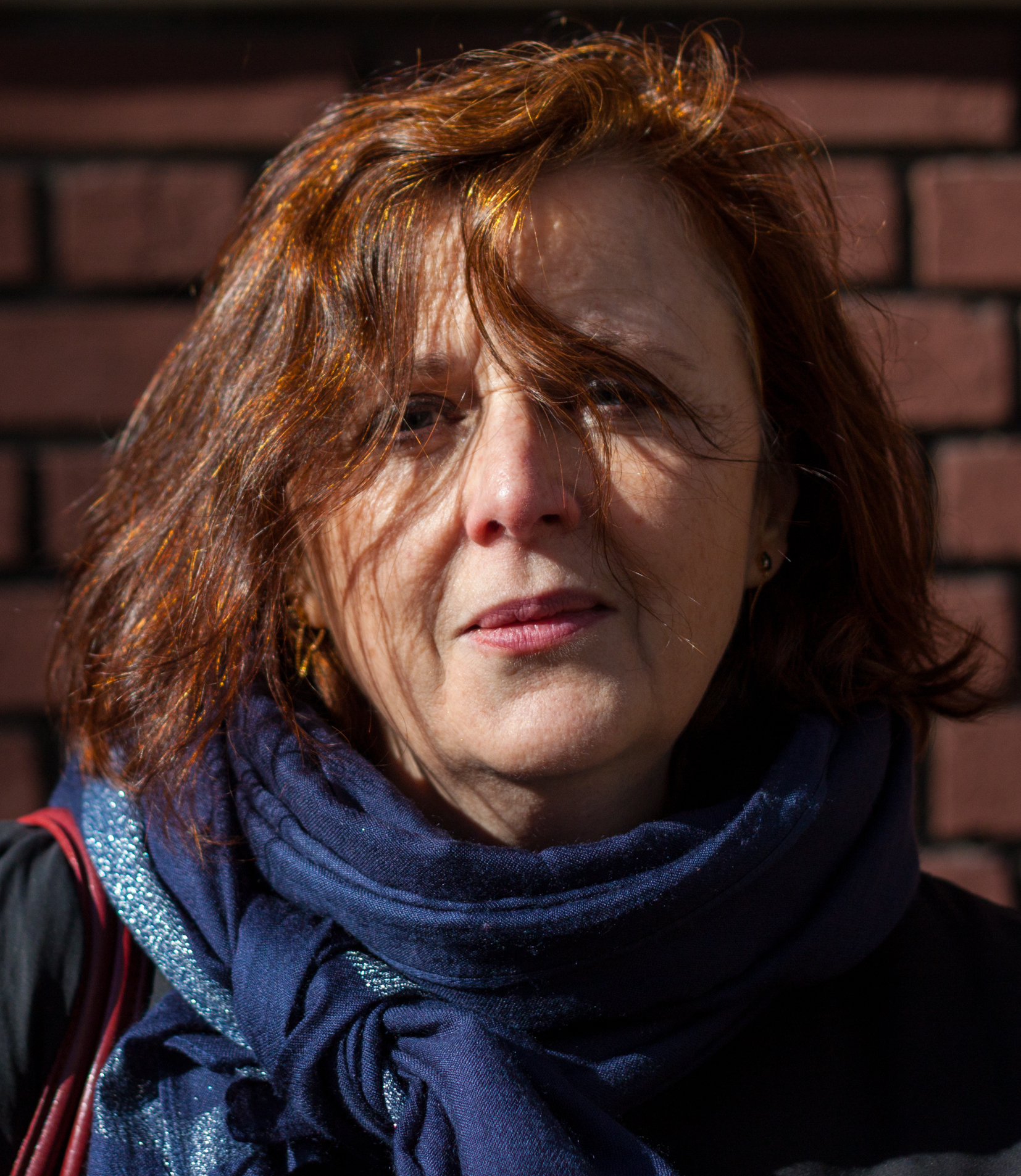
Mercedes Deambrosis in 2016.

Mercedes Deambrosis (born 1 October 1955 in Madrid) is a Spanish writer who writes in French; she arrived in France at the age of 12. Many of her novels are set in Spain.

== Works ==
- 2001: Un après-midi avec Rock Hudson (Buchet/Chastel) ISBN 978-2283018644
- 2002: Suite et Fin au Grand Condé (Buchet/Chastel) ISBN 978-2283019030
- 2004: La Promenade des délices (Buchet/Chastel) ISBN 978-2283019498
- 2005: Milagrosa (Buchet-/hastel) ISBN 978-2283020692
- 2006: La Plieuse de parachutes (Buchet/Chastel) ISBN 9782283019665
- 2008: Candelaria ne viendra pas (Éditions du Chemin de fer) ISBN 2916130128
- 2009: Juste pour le Plaisir (Buchet/Chastel) ISBN 978-2283023532
- 2009: Rien de bien grave (Éditions du Chemin de fer) ISBN 978-2-916130-21-7
- 2010: De naissance (Editions du Moteur) (reprint in 2011 in Six façons de le dire, collective work (with Nicolas d'Estienne d'Orves, Sophie Adriansen, Yasmina Khadra, David Foenkinos, Christophe Ferré), Editions du Moteur)
- 2013: Le Dernier des treize (Éditions Labranche) ISBN 978-2-35306-050-4
- 2014: L'Étrange Apparition de Tecla Osorio (Éditions des Busclats) ISBN 978-2-36166-024-6
