= Charles Hughes (Royal Navy officer) =

British Royal Navy officer

Captain Charles Hughes
- Died: 11 August 1819
- Military career
- Allegiance: Kingdom of Great Britain
- Branch: Royal Navy
- Rank: Captain
- Commands: HMS Exeter; HMS Worcester; HMS Seahorse; HMS Bristol; East Indies Station
- Conflicts: American Revolutionary War

Captain Charles Hughes (died 11 August 1819) was a Royal Navy officer who became Commander-in-Chief of the East Indies Station.

== Naval career ==
In 1782 Hughes commanded HMS Exeter before transferring to command HMS Worcester in November 1782. On 20 June 1783 the Worcester took part in the Battle of Cuddalore, an action with the French fleet off Cuddalore which took place after peace had been signed in Europe but before the news had reached India and which became the final battle of the American Revolutionary War.

He was appointed Commander-in-Chief of the East Indies Station in 1785 and remained in post until 1787.

He lived at Friday Hill House in Essex.

Military offices
Preceded by Andrew Mitchell	Commander-in-Chief, East Indies Station; 1785–1787	Succeeded by William Cornwallis
