= François-Jean-Baptiste l'Ollivier de Tronjoli =

French Navy officer

François-Jean-Baptiste l'Ollivier de Tronjoli (Note: Also spelt "Lollivier", and "Tronjoly") was a French Navy officer.

== Biography ==
In 1763, Tronjoli commanded the frigate Licorne, cruising off Newfoundland and Saint-Pierre, before returning to Brest. The year after, he was again at Newfoundland with Licorne and Amphion, supporting fishing. In 1767, he was again supporting fishing off Newfoundland, this time captaining the 32-gun frigate Inconstante, and in 1768 again with Enjouée.

In 1768, he commanded the 32-gun frigate Enjouée and sailed from Newfoundland to Morocco to test marine chronometers by Pierre Le Roy and John Harrison one against the other, as part of the quest for an accurate measurement of longitude. The tests showed that Le Roy's chronometer did not perform better than Harrison's.

In 1770, Tronjoli was tasked with ferrying troops between Martinique and France, with the 64-gun Union and the fluyt Seine. In 1771, he commanded Union for a cruise to the Cape of Good Hope, where he was again the year after.

In 1773, Tronjoli was given command of the 64-gun Lion, which he sailed from Brest to Toulon.

Tronjoly was promoted to Brigadier in 1776. He was given command of the 64-gun Indien, and later the 64-gun Brillant at Isle de France (Mauritius) and Ile Bourbon. In 1777, he was patrolling the Malabar coast and protecting French interests at Puducherry. The year after, he conducted diplomatic missions to the Aceh Sultanate and took part in the Siege of Pondicherry. He also conducted reconnaissance of the port of Trincomalee, which he reported as a good harbour, but with poor infrastructure and defences, and therefore of little practical interest for naval operations. Tronjoli twice wrote to the Navy Minister to warn of his lack of resources to carry out his missions against the British, and failing to get reinforcements, fell back to commerce raiding. He despatched frigates to the Cape of Good Hope in an attempt to disrupt British commerce there, but the attempt was largely unsuccessful.

From 1779, he commanded the India Division, with his flag on the 64-gun Brillant. That year, he was opposed to Captain Saint-Orens, of Pourvoyeuse, regarding the capture of the East Indiaman Osterley.

On 22 November 1779, Tronjoli was relieved of duty. He was replaced with Thomas d'Estienne d'Orves. He was later recalled to France and embarked on Osterley to return to Brest, where he arrived in late April 1781.

== Sources and references ==
Notes

Bibliography

- Caron, François (1996). Le Mythe Suffren. Vincennes: Service historique de la Marine.
- Cunat, Charles (1852). Histoire du Bailli de Suffren. Rennes: A. Marteville et Lefas.
- Doneaud Du Plan, Alfred (1878). Histoire de l'Académie de marine (in French). Paris: Berger-Levrault.
- Roussel, Claude-Youenn; Forrer, Claude (2019). Tromeling et Suffren, un conflit entre marins. Kronos. ISBN 978-2-917232-88-0.

External links

- Archives nationales (2011). "Fonds Marine, sous-série B/4: Campagnes, 1571-1785" (PDF).
