= French frigate Pourvoyeuse =

French Navy 40-gun frigate

History

France
- Name: Pourvoyuese
- Namesake: "Purveyor"
- Ordered: 6 February 1772
- Builder: Lorient
- Laid down: March 1772
- Launched: 10 November 1772
- In service: 1773
- Fate: Deleted 1794

General characteristics
- Class & type: Pourvoyeuse-class frigate
- Displacement: 1928 tonneaux
- Tons burthen: 840 port tonneaux
- Length: 50 m (164 ft 1 in)
- Beam: 12.3 m (40 ft 4 in)
- Draught: 6.3 m (20 ft 8 in)
- Armament: Main deck: 26 × 18-pounder guns; Forecastle: 12 × 8-pounder guns

Pourvoyeuse was a 40-gun frigate of the French Navy, lead ship of her class. She is notable as one of the earliest attempts at building a frigate armed with 24-pounders on the artillery deck, rather than the 18-pounders typical of the day.

== Career ==
Launched at Lorient in November 1772, Pourvoyeuse was completed during the following year.

During the American Revolutionary War, she took part in the Indian campaign of the naval operations, notable in the Siege of Pondicherry. At the outbreak of the war, Pourvoyeuse, under Captain Saint-Orens, constituted the brunt of the French naval forces at Pondicherry, along with the 64-gun Brillant, under Captain François-Jean-Baptiste l'Ollivier de Tronjoli, whose departure for France had been delayed in response to the British preparations for war.

On 21 February 1779, under Captain de Tromelin, she captured the East Indiaman Osterley (1771 EIC ship). (Note: Roche indicates 21 February 1778 for the date of the capture of the Osterley, but this is probably a typo; the National Archives state that Osterley was captured on 22 February 1779, as does Cunat with his Histoire du Bailly Suffren.)

On 1 November 1781, Lieutenant Morard de Galles was given command of Pourvoyeuse. After Thomas d'Estienne d'Orves died on 9 February 1782 and he assumed command of the French forces in the Indian Ocean, Suffren gave Morard de Galles command of the 50-gun Petit Hannibal, putting Lieutenant de Ruyter in charge Pourvoyeuse.

In March 1781, Pourvoyeuse escorted transports bound for the neutral Danish harbour of Trinquebar. The convoy sustained an attack from the British, and the transport Bons-Amis, under Captain Granières, managed to repel HMS Seahorse. Pourvoyeuse failed to intervene, and Suffren replaced Lieutenant De Ruyter with Lannuguy-Tromelin.

In early July 1782, during the run-up of the Battle of Negapatam, Suffren sent Pourvoyeuse to Malacca to purchase spare spars, food and ammunition to resupply his fleet. After the battle, Pourvoyeuse had to provide her entire main mast to Brillant and exchange it for that of the fluyt Fortitude.

In late 1782, Pourvoyeuse cruised in the Strait of Malacca under Captain de Lannuguy-Tromelin. On 9 September, she encountered the East Indiamen Asia, Essex, Locko, and Osterley (1780 EIC ship), and the country ship Shah Byram Gore. The next day the action of 10 September 1782 ensued, an inconclusive two-and-a-half hour battle after which Pourvoyeuse withdrew. She had suffered four men killed and several wounded.

After Pourvoyeuse withdrew, she sailed for Malacca where she could take shelter under the guns of the Dutch fort there. On 26 December she arrived at Trincomalee, which the French under Bailli de Suffren had captured from the British at the battle of Trincomalee on 3 September 1782, having left him and his squadron at Aceh, where they were wintering. At Trincomalee the memorist William Hickey met Trommelin. Later, Hickey described Pourvoyeuse as "Almost tumbling to pieces, and in want of every kind of stores."

== Fate ==
Pourvoyeuse was later armed en flûte, with her armament reduced to 26 guns. She was eventually struck from the lists in 1794.
