= William Wolseley (Royal Navy officer) =

Royal Navy Admiral (1756–1842)

Admiral William Wolseley
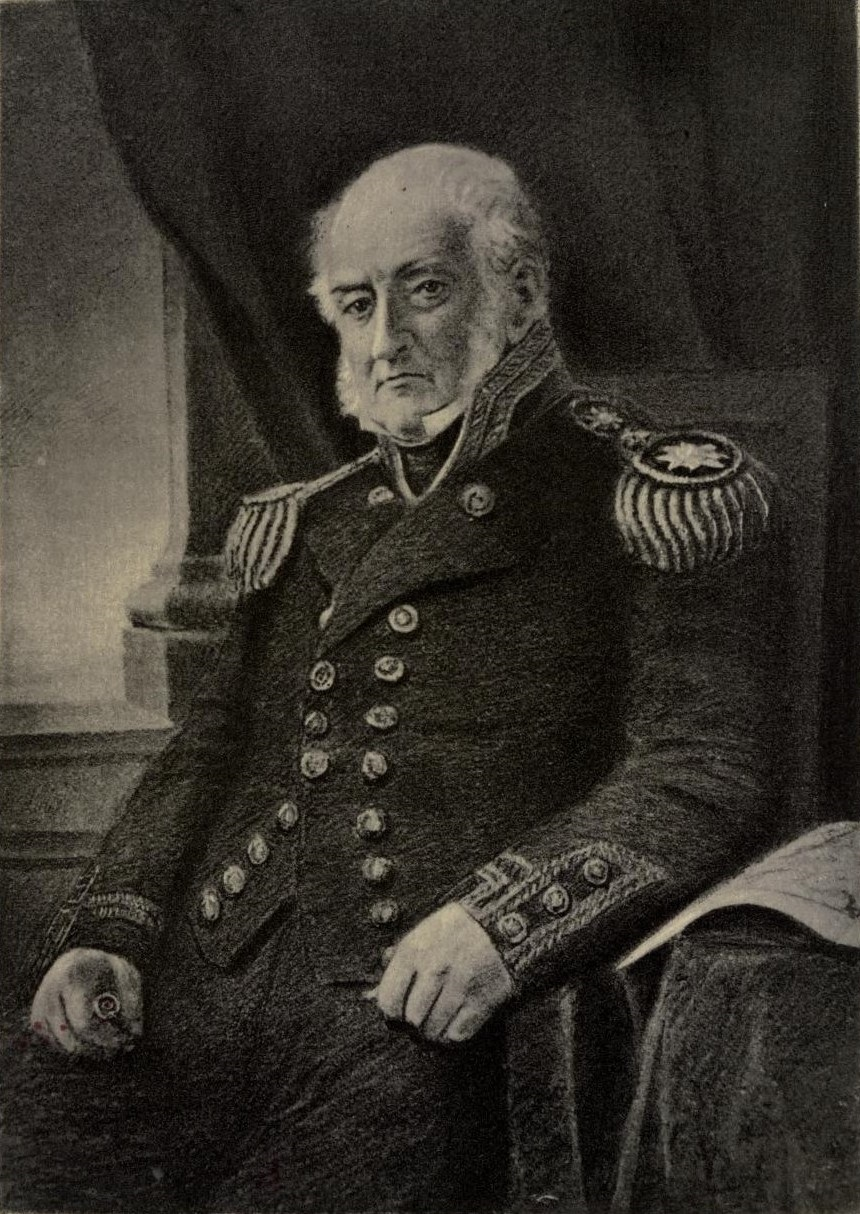
- Reproduction of the portrait by Laur (1840)
- Born: 15 March 1756; Annapolis Royal, Nova Scotia
- Died: 7 June 1842 (aged 86); London, England
- Spouse: Jane Moore (m. 1795)
- Children: 4 (2 sons, 2 daughters)
- Military career
- Allegiance: Great Britain; United Kingdom
- Branch: Royal Navy
- Service years: 1769–1805
- Rank: Admiral of the Red
- Conflicts: Fourth Anglo-Dutch War; Second Anglo-Mysore War; War of the Second Coalition

Admiral William Wolseley (1756 – 1842) was an Anglo-Irish naval officer in the Royal Navy.

== Life ==
William Wolseley, of the Irish branch of the old Staffordshire family of Wolseley, was born on 15 March 1756 at Annapolis Royal in Nova Scotia, where his father, Captain William Neville Wolseley, of the 47th Regiment of Foot, was then in garrison. His mother was Anne, sister of Admiral Phillips Cosby. In 1764 the family returned to Ireland; and in 1769 William, who had been at school in Kilkenny, was entered on board the cutter Goodwill at Waterford, commanded by his father's brother-in-law, Lieutenant John Buchanan. Two years later, when the Goodwill was paid off, Wolseley was sent by his uncle Cosby to a nautical school in Westminster, from which, after some months, he joined the Portland, going out to Jamaica. He returned to England in the Princess Amelia, and in September 1773 joined the 50-gun ship Salisbury, with Commodore [Sir] Edward Hughes, Commander-in-Chief in the East Indies. The Salisbury came home in the end of 1777, and Wolseley, having passed his examination, was promoted, 11 June 1778, to be junior lieutenant of the Duke, one of the fleet with Keppel in July, though on the 27th she had fallen so far to leeward that she had no part in the action. When the autumn cruise came to an end, Wolseley, at the suggestion of Sir Edward Hughes, going out again as Commander-in-Chief in the East Indies, effected an exchange into the Worcester, one of his squadron. After some service against pirates in the Indian seas, he commanded a company of the naval brigade at the reduction of Negapatam in October 1781, and again at the storming of Fort Ostenburg, Trincomalee, on 11 January 1782, when he was severely wounded in the chest by a charge of slugs from a gingal, and left for dead in the ditch. Happily he was found the next day and carried on board the Worcester. He was shortly afterwards moved into the Superb, Hughes's flagship, and in her was present in the first four of the actions with the Bailli de Suffren. After the last of these, 3 September 1782, he was promoted to be commander of the fireship Combustion, and on 14 September was posted to the frigate Coventry, which on the night of 12 January 1783 ran in among the French fleet in Ganjam Roads, mistaking the ships for Indiamen, and was captured. Wolseley was civilly treated by Suffren, who sent him as a prisoner to Mauritius. He was shortly afterwards transferred to Bourbon, where he was detained till the announcement of peace. He then got a passage to St. Helena in a French transport, and so home in an East Indiaman.

In 1786 he was appointed to the Trusty, fitting out at Portsmouth for the broad pennant of his uncle, Phillips Cosby. After a three years' commission in the Mediterranean, the Trusty came home and was paid off. In 1792 Wolseley was appointed to the frigate Lowestoft, in which in the early months of 1793 he was employed in convoy duty in St. George's Channel. He was then sent out to join Lord Hood in the Mediterranean; was present at the occupation of Toulon, and on 30 September, while detached under Commodore Linzee, occupied the celebrated Mortella Tower, which, being handed over to the Corsicans, was retaken by the French some three weeks later, and on 8 February 1794 beat off the 74-gun ship Fortitude, inflicting on her severe loss and damage. The Tower was, however, shortly afterwards captured by a landing party under the command of Wolseley. A few days later he was moved into the Impérieuse, which went home in the end of the year. He had hoped to be again appointed to her; but he was recommended by Hood, and to some extent shared in the ill-feeling of the Admiralty towards the discarded admiral, so that for nearly five years he was left unemployed.

Towards the end of 1795 he married Jane, daughter of John Moore of Clough House, County Down, grandson of a Scottish officer, Colonel Muir, who had served in Ireland under William III and obtained a grant of land. He took a little place near Clough House, and lived there in retirement except during the Rebellion of 1798, when he commanded a company of volunteers which took part in the "Battle" of Ballynahinch. Early in 1799 he was appointed to the 74-gun ship Terrible, one of the Channel Fleet under Lord Bridport, and in 1800 under Lord St. Vincent. In December 1800 he was moved into the St. George, but on that ship being selected as the Flagship of Lord Nelson, in February 1801, Wolseley was transferred to the San Josef, which was paid off on the signing of the Peace of Amiens. He afterwards had command of the Sea Fencibles of the Shannon district till his promotion to the rank of rear-admiral on 23 April 1804. He was then appointed to the command of the Sea Fencibles of all Ireland, from which he retired towards the end of 1805. He had no further employment, but was made vice-admiral on 25 October 1809 and admiral on 12 August 1819.

In the spring of 1842 the old wound received sixty years before at the storming of Fort Ostenberg opened and would not heal. The surgeons came to the conclusion that something must have remained in the wound, and, as the result of an operation, extracted a jagged piece of lead and a fragment of cloth. The wound, however, would not heal. Gradually losing strength, he died in London on 7 June 1842. He was then the senior admiral of the red. His wife had died several years before, leaving issue two sons and two daughters. His portrait, painted in Paris, in 1840, by Jules Laur, was inherited by his granddaughter.

== Bibliography ==
- Innes, Mary C. (1895). A Memoir of William Wolseley, Admiral of the Red Squadron. London: Kegan Paul, Trench, Trübner, & Co. Ltd.
- Laughton, J. K.; Doorne, Christopher (2004). "Wolseley, William (1756–1842)". In Oxford Dictionary of National Biography. Oxford: Oxford University Press.
- Laughton, John Knox (1900). "Wolseley, William (1756-1842)" . In Lee, Sidney (ed.). Dictionary of National Biography. Vol. 62. London: Smith, Elder & Co. pp. 324–325.
