= Nicolas d'Estienne d'Orves =

French writer

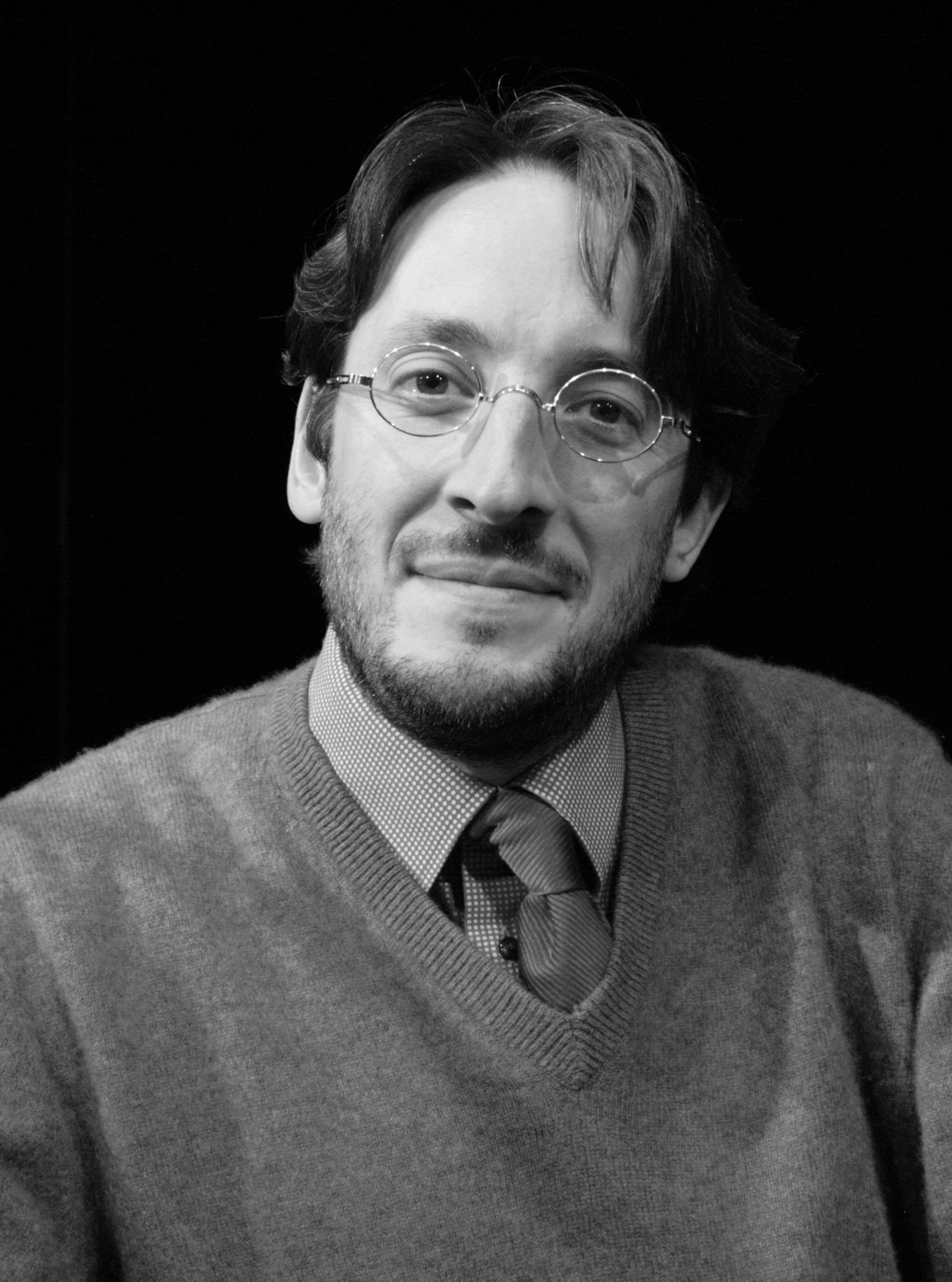
Nicolas d’Estienne d’Orves, in 2012

Nicolas d’Estienne d’Orves (born 10 September 1974, in Neuilly-sur-Seine) is a French journalist and writer.

== Biography ==
Nicolas d’Estienne d’Orves is Résistant Henri Honoré d'Estienne d'Orves's grand-nephew .

A former student of hypokhâgne, after internships in cinema and opera, he studied at the Sorbonne.

By an exceptional combination of circumstances, he became the beneficiary of the collaborationist writer Lucien Rebatet. At the age of 22, while writing a master's thesis at the Sorbonne, he discovered his Histoire de la musique and grew passionate about its author. On this occasion, he met Pierre Darrigrand, Rebatet's executor, who before dying of cancer asked him to become, in turn, the beneficiary of the writer.

He has collaborated with Le Figaro littéraire, Madame Figaro, Le Figaro Magazine and Le Spectacle du Monde.

For four and a half years, Nicolas d'Estienne d'Orves hosted a column one Saturday noon per month on the Étonnez-moi Benoît program by Benoît Duteurtre on France Musique. In December 2008, he was terminated by his director Marc-Olivier Dupin for blasphemy and pornography after broadcasting a bawdy version of the Christmas carol Il est né, le divin Enfant.

He is the author of several short stories, essays and novels, notably Othon ou l'Aurore immobile, crowned with the Prix Roger Nimier in 2002.

Nicolas d’Estienne d’Orves is a chronicler at the Figaroscope, musical critic at Le Figaro and musical chronicler for the magazine Classica. He regularly collaborates at Les Echos. Since 2011, he has been a member of the jury of the prix Saint-Germain.

== Works ==
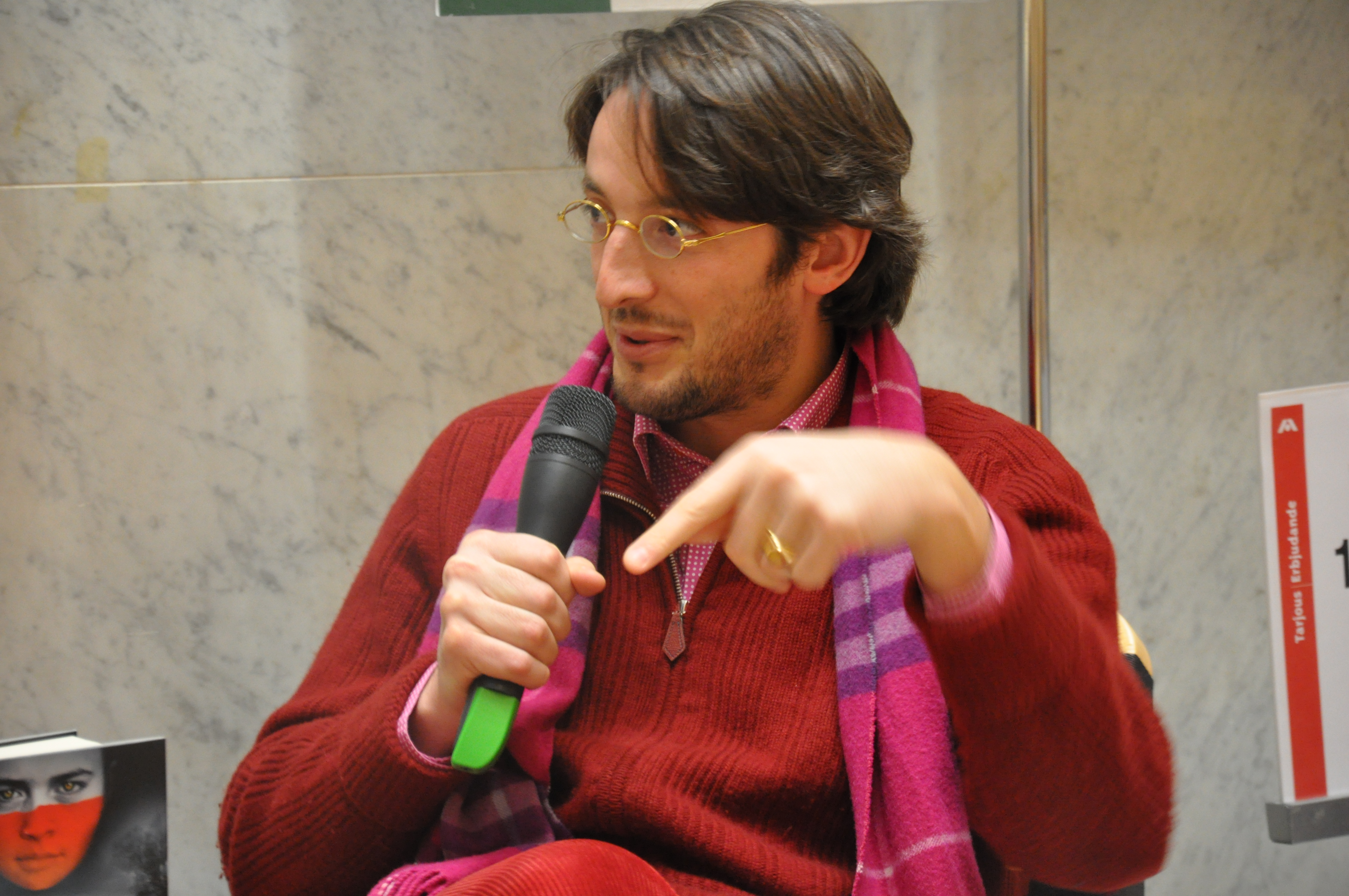
Nicolas d’Estienne d’Orves in 2009.

=== Novels and essays ===
- 2001: Le Sourire des enfants morts, Les Belles Lettres
- 2002: Les Aventures extraordinaires de l'opéra, Les Belles lettres
- 2002: Fin de race, Flammarion, Prix Jacques-Bergier 2002.)
- 2002: Othon ou l'Aurore immobile, Les Belles lettres, Prix Roger-Nimier 2002
- 2003: Le Regard du poussin, Les Belles lettres
- 2003: Rue de l’autre monde, Le Masque
- 2004: Un été en Amérique, Flammarion
- 2005: La Sainte famille, Mille et une nuits
- 2005: Bulletin blanc ! : Autofriction, Éditions du Rocher
- 2007: Les Orphelins du mal, XO
- 2009: Les Derniers Jours de Paris, XO, Prix de la ville du Touquet
- 2009: Le Petit Néo de la conversation, JC Lattès
- 2010 Coup de fourchette, Éditions du Moteur, (reprint in Six façons de le dire, collective work with Yasmina Khadra, Sophie Adriansen, Mercedes Deambrosis, David Foenkinos, Christophe Ferré, Éditions du Moteur, 2011)
- 2010: Jacques Offenbach, Actes Sud, Prix de la ville de Deauville.
- 2011: Je pars à l’entracte, NiL Éditions, series "Les Affranchis"
- 2011: L’Enfant du premier matin, XO, Prix des Romancières 2012
- 2012: Les Fidélités successives, Albin Michel, Prix Cazes brasserie Lipp - Prix du feuilleton 2012 - Prix de Val d'Isère 2013
- 2012: Le Village de la fin du monde, Éditions Grasset
- 2014: La Dévoration, Albin Michel
- 2015: Dictionnaire amoureux de Paris, Plon, Prix Jean-Jacques Berger 2015 de l'Académie des Sciences Morales et Politiques - Prix de l'Académie Rabelais 2016.
- 2015: La Monnaie de Paris, 1150 ans d'histoire, Albin Michel
- 2016: Paris n'est qu'un songe, Steinkis
- 2017: La Gloire des Maudits, Albin Michel
- 2017: Petits plaisirs que seul Paris procure, J'ai lu
- 2017: Dictionnaire amoureux illustré de Paris, Plon / Gründ
- 2018: Le Silence et la Fureur, en collaboration avec Natalie Carter, XO
- 2018: Narcisse et moi, rééditions de certaines nouvelles du Sourire des enfants morts et du Regard du poussin, Le Castor Astral
- 2018: Marthe Richard ou les beaux mensonges, Calmann-Lévy
- 2019: Petite encyclopédie (très subjective) du mauvais-goût , Michel Lafon
- 2021: Petit éloge de la gourmandise, éditions François Bourin, (Prix Jean Carmet 2021. Prix des écrivains gastronomes 2021. Prix du Clos Vougeot 2021).
- 2022: Ce que l'on sait de Max Toppard, Albin Michel
- 2023: Dictionnaire amoureux du mauvais goût, Plon ("coup de Shako" du Prix des Hussards 2023)
- 2023: Arletty, un cœur libre, Calmann-Lévy
- 2025: L'Ile de l'orgueil, Albin Michel (with the pseudonym NéO)
- 2026: La Reine de mai, Albin Michel (with the pseudonym NéO)

=== Short stories ===
- 2003: Plaisir d'offrir, in anthology Noirs complots (dir. Pierre Lagrange),

== Prizes and distinctions ==
- 2002: Prix Roger Nimier
- 2002: Prix Jacques Bergier
- 2009: Prix de la ville du Touquet
- 2010: Prix de la ville de Deauville
- 2012: Prix Cazes brasserie Lipp
- 2012: Prix des romancières
- 2012: Prix du feuilleton
- 2013: Prix de Val d'Isère
- 2015: Prix Jean-Jacques Berger of the Académie des Sciences Morales et Politiques
- 2016: Prix de l'Académie Rabelais
