= HMS Coventry (1757) =

Coventry-class Royal Navy frigate

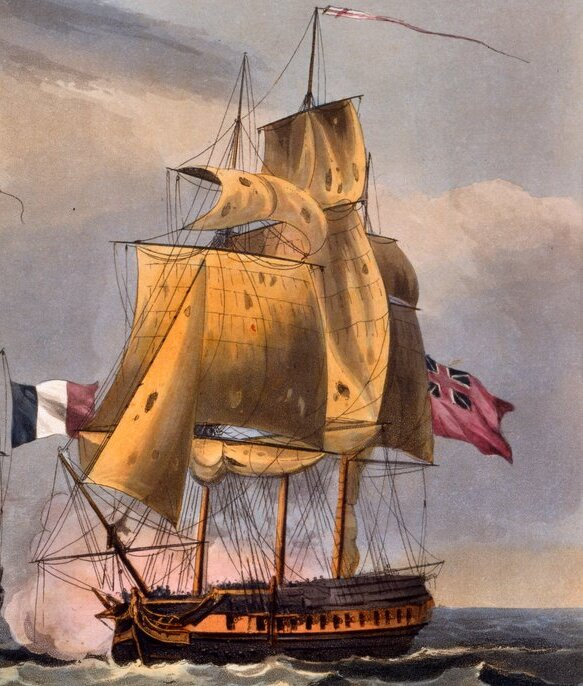
- Coventry was built to the same design as HMS Carysfort, (pictured)

History

Great Britain
- Name: HMS Coventry
- Operator: Royal Navy
- Ordered: 13 April 1756
- Awarded: 28 April 1756
- Builder: Henry Adams's yard, Bucklers Hard
- Laid down: 31 May 1756
- Launched: 30 May 1757
- Completed: 31 July 1757 at Portsmouth Dockyard
- Commissioned: May 1757
- Out of service: 1757–1763; 1763–1768; 1775–1783
- Honours and awards: Battle of Quiberon Bay 1759; Battle of Trincomalee 1782
- Captured: 12 January 1783 off Ganjam, Bay of Bengal

France
- Name: Coventry
- Acquired: January 1783 by capture
- Decommissioned: January 1785 at Brest
- In service: 1783–1785
- Fate: Broken up, 1786

General characteristics
- Class & type: Coventry-class frigate
- Displacement: 850 tons (French)
- Tons burthen: 599 25/94 (bm)
- Length: 118 ft 4 3/4 in (36.087 m) (gundeck); 97 ft 0 1/2 in (29.578 m) (keel)
- Beam: 34 ft 0 7/8 in (10.385 m)
- Depth of hold: 10 ft 6 in (3.20 m)
- Sail plan: Full-rigged ship
- Complement: British service: 200; French service: 210 (war) and 130 (peace)
- Armament: British service; Upper deck: 24 × 9-pounder guns; QD: 4 × 3-pounder guns; Also: 12 × swivel guns; French service; Upper deck: 24 × 9-pounder guns; Spardeck: 4 × 6-pounders + 6 × 18-pounder carronades

HMS Coventry was a 28-gun sixth-rate frigate of the Royal Navy, launched in 1757 and in active service as a privateer hunter during the Seven Years' War, and as part of the British fleet in India during the Anglo-French War. After seventeen years' in British service she was captured by the French in 1783, off Ganjam in the Bay of Bengal. Thereafter she spent two years as part of the French Navy until January 1785 when she was removed from service at the port of Brest. She was broken up in 1786.

== Design ==
Sir Thomas Slade designed Coventry "to the draught of the Tartar with such alterations withinboard as may be judged necessary", making her a further development of Lyme. A further twelve ships were built to the draught of Coventry between 1756 and 1763, as well as another five to a modified version of fir (pine) construction.

The vessel was named after the city of Coventry in England's West Midlands. In selecting her name the Board of Admiralty continued a tradition, dating to 1644, of using geographic features; overall, ten of the nineteen Coventry-class vessels, including Coventry herself, were named after well-known regions, rivers or towns. With few exceptions the remainder of the class were named after figures from classical antiquity, following a more modern trend initiated in 1748 by John Montagu, 4th Earl of Sandwich in his capacity as First Lord of the Admiralty. (Note: The exceptions to these naming conventions were Hussar, Active and the final vessel in the class, Hind)

In sailing qualities Coventry was broadly comparable with French frigates of equivalent size, but with a shorter and sturdier hull and greater weight in her broadside guns. She was also comparatively broad-beamed which, when coupled with Adams' modifications to her hull, provided ample space for provisions, the ship's mess and a large magazine for powder and round shot. (Note: Coventry's dimensional ratios 3.57:1 in length to breadth, and 3.3:1 in breadth to depth, compare with standard French equivalents of up to 3.8:1 and 3:1 respectively. Royal Navy vessels of equivalent size and design to Coventry were capable of carrying up to 20 tons of powder and shot, compared with a standard French capacity of around 10 tons. They also carried greater stores of rigging, spars, sails and cables, but had fewer ship's boats and less space for the possessions of the crew.) Taken together, these characteristics would enable Coventry to remain at sea for long periods without resupply. She was also built with broad and heavy masts, which balanced the weight of her hull, improved stability in rough weather and made her capable of carrying a greater quantity of sail. The disadvantages of this comparatively heavy design were a decline in manoeuvrability and slower speed when sailing in light winds.

== British career ==
Coventry saw active service shortly after launch. On 19 December 1757 she was chasing the 14-gun French privateer Diamond when that vessel caught fire and exploded, likely as a result of sparks flying from her guns back into the powder room. Five days later, in company with the 36-gun frigate HMS Brilliant, Coventry engaged and defeated a 24-gun privateer, Le Dragon. Six of Coventry's sailors were wounded in the brief exchange of fire with the French vessel, compared with four killed and either 10 or 12 wounded aboard the privateer. A total of 280 French sailors survived the battle and were taken prisoner aboard Coventry and Brilliant.

Early on the morning of 10 August 1778, Admiral Edward Vernon's squadron, consisting of Rippon (Vernon's flagship), Coventry, Seahorse, Cormorant, and the East India Company's ship Valentine, encountered a French squadron under Admiral François l'Ollivier de Tronjoly which consisted of the 64-gun ship of the line Le Brillant, the frigate La Pourvoyeuse, and three smaller ships, Sartine, Lauriston, and Brisson. An inconclusive action followed for about two hours in mid-afternoon. The French broke off the action and the British vessels were too damaged to be able to catch them up again. In the action the British suffered 11 men killed and 53 wounded, including one man killed and 20 wounded aboard Coventry.

Seahorse captured Sartine on 25 August 1778. Sartine had been patrolling off Pondichery with Pourvoyeuse when they sighted two East Indiamen, which were sailing blithely along, unaware of the outbreak of war. The French vessels gave chase lazily. Sartine's captain, Count du Chaillar, first had to be roused from his bed ashore. The British merchant vessels escaped, but Sartine came too close to Vernon's squadron. Vernon sent Coventry and Seahorse after her and she surrendered after a short action. A French account remarks acidly that she surrendered to a frigate of her own size without a fight. All four Royal Navy vessels in Vernon's squadron shared in the prize money. (Vernon had already sent Valentine off with dispatches.) The Royal Navy took Sartine into service as the fifth-rate frigate HMS Sartine.

On 12 August 1782, Coventry, under the command of Captain Andrew Mitchell encountered the French frigate Bellone off Friars Hood, Ceylon. In the ensuing Action of 12 August 1782, Coventry killed the senior staff of Bellone, allowing her to escape her stronger opponent. Coventry suffered 15 men killed and 29 wounded in the engagement.

On 14 September 1782, Captain William Wolseley took command of Coventry. On the night of 12 January 1783, chasing the frigate Fine which he had mistaken for a privateer, Wolseley sailed Coventry into Ganjam Roads, where Suffren's Héros, Illustre, Ajax and Brillant were at anchor. Wolseley had no information that French vessels were in the area and so allowed the current to take him towards the vessels, the wind being weak. As Coventry arrived, Suffren, on Héros, was sending a boat over to Illustre, but the boat master was drunk and instead mistakenly came aboard Coventry. The boat's crew was promptly taken prisoners and taken to the orlop deck. At this moment, the French division noticed Coventry, and Illustre, Ajax and Brillant opened fire. Interrogating his prisoners, Wolseley learnt that the ships firing on him were part of Suffren's squadron, at which point his men rushed below. Alone on his quarterdeck, Wolseley had no choice but to surrender.

== French career ==
The French brought Coventry in service under the same name, under Le Carlier d'Herlye. The same day, Coventry captured the East Indiaman Bland-Fort, which had escaped Fine a few days before.

On 20 June 1783, she took part in the Battle of Cuddalore, where she was part of Suffren's frigate screen.

== Fate ==
The French sailed Coventry to Brest, where they decommissioned her in January 1785. She was broken up in 1786.
