= Thomas d'Estienne d'Orves =

French admiral (1727–1782)

- Born: 1727
- Died: 9 February 1782 (aged 54–55)
- Relatives: Estienne Family
- Military career
- Allegiance: Kingdom of France
- Branch: French Navy
- Rank: Chef d'escadre
- Conflicts: Anglo-French War: Battle of Ushant

Jean-Baptiste Barthélémy Thomas, comte d'Orves (1727 — Orient, off Madras, (Note: Present-day Chennai) 9 February 1782 ) was a French Navy officer, who rose to have flag officer rank. (Note: D'Estienne d'Orves had the rank of Captain, but was given the authority of a "Brigadier of the Naval Armies" (rear-Admiral) commanding the Isle de France division.)

== Biography ==
Thomas d'Estienne d'Orves was born to the Estienne Family, a noble house of Provence.

During the Anglo-French War, on 27 July 1778, Estienne d'Orves took part in the Battle of Ushant as captain of the 74-gun Actif.

In late 1778, Estienne d'Orves was in command of the 80-gun Orient. On 28 December he departed Brest to reinforce the French colony of Isle de France. (Note: The present-day Mauritius) When François-Jean-Baptiste l'Ollivier de Tronjoli, commander of the French forces in the Indian Ocean, was recalled to France, he transferred command to Estienne d'Orves.

Estienne d'Orves led his squadron off the Coromandel Coast, with little effect. In April 1781, his health deteriorating, Estienne d'Orves gave command of the division to Tromelin, and that of Orient to First Officer Bolle. Suffren arrived at Isle de France with reinforcements on 25 October 1781, and Estienne d'Orves decided to mount a raid against British interests in India.

On 7 December 1781, Estienne d'Orves departed Isle de France with 11 ships, 3 frigates and 3 corvettes, intending to attack Trincomalee. However, he changed his mind and decided to attack Madras instead. However, in the following days, his failing health deteriorated to the point where he was not fit for duty, and he delegated command to Suffren. He died on 9 February 1782, a few days before the Battle of Sadras.

== Assessment ==
Charles Cunat compares d'Orves to Tronjoli in that they both failed to seize the initiative against the British, and contrasts them to Suffren's skill. Admiral Rémi Monaque called d'Orves a "rather mediocre admiral".

== Sources and references ==
Notes

Bibliography

- Cunat, Charles (1852). Histoire du Bailli de Suffren. Rennes: A. Marteville et Lefas. pp. 447.
- Monaque, Rémi (2017). "Le Bailli Pierre-André de Suffren: A Precursor of Nelson". Naval Leadership in the Atlantic World: The Age of Reform and Revolution, 1700–1850. University of Westminster Press. pp. 85–92. ISBN 9781911534082. JSTOR j.ctv5vddxt.12., CC-BY-NC-ND 4.0
- Roche, Jean-Michel (2005). Dictionnaire des bâtiments de la flotte de guerre française de Colbert à nos jours, 1671 - 1870. Group Retozel-Maury Millau. pp. 325–6. ISBN 978-2-9525917-0-6. OCLC 165892922.
- Troude, Onésime-Joachim (1867). Batailles navales de la France (in French). Vol. 2. Challamel ainé. OCLC 836362484.
