= French corvette Lawriston (1778) =

History

France
- Name: Lawriston
- Builder: Rangoon
- Launched: 1778
- Captured: 16 February 1782

General characteristics
- Class & type: Corvette
- Tons burthen: 1000 tons
- Propulsion: Sails
- Sail plan: Full-rigged ship
- Armament: 22 guns

Lawriston was a 22-gun corvette of the French Navy.

== Career ==
Originally a ship of the French East India Company, Lawriston was brought into service in the French Navy. She took part in the Siege of Pondicherry in 1778.

She was returned to merchant service in June 1781 at Île de France but again requisitioned in December 1781.

HMS Isis captured her on 16 February 1782, during the prelude of the Battle of Sadras. Lawriston was carrying a large part of the field artillery for the French army in the Indian Ocean, as well as two companies of the Légion de Lauzun. Her captain had decided to pray on small merchantmen, and failed to escape in time when the British appeared.
