= French frigate Brisson (1767) =

History

France
- Name: Brisson
- Builder: Lorient
- Launched: 27 September 1767
- Out of service: 1781

General characteristics
- Class & type: Frigate
- Tons burthen: 650 to 700 tons
- Propulsion: Sails
- Sail plan: Full-rigged ship
- Armament: 20, later 24 8-pounders

Brisson was a 22-gun corvette of the French Navy.

== Career ==
Brisson was built as a fluyt for the Mississippi Company. She became property of the Crown on 8 December 1769 with the liquidation of the Company, and commissioned as a light frigate. She was sold to the commerce circa September 1771.

She returned to the service of the Crown when the French requisitioned in July 1778 for the defence of Pondicherry. She was captured by the British at Pondicherry in September 1778.
