= List of ship launches in 1760 =

The list of ship launches in 1760 includes a chronological list of some ships launched in 1760.

Date	Ship	Class	Builder	Location	Country	Notes
January	York	East Indiaman	John Wells	Deptford	Great Britain	For British East India Company.
19 February	Bellona	Bellona-class ship of the line	John Lock	Chatham Dockyard	Great Britain	For Royal Navy.
4 March	Dragon	Bellona-class ship of the line	Adam Hayes	Deptford Dockyard	Great Britain	For Royal Navy.
7 March	Amack			Copenhagen	Denmark-Norway	For Dano-Norwegian Navy.
7 March	Falster	Fifth rate		Copenhagen	Denmark-Norway	For Dano-Norwegian Navy.
7 March	Jutland			Copenhagen	Denmark-Norway	For Dano-Norwegian Navy.
19 March	Thunderer	Hercules-class ship of the line	William Pownall	Woolwich Dockyard	Great Britain	For Royal Navy.
23 March	Altier	Lion-class ship of the line	Joseph-Marie-Blaise Coulomb	Toulon	Kingdom of France	For French Navy.
22 May	Protecteur	Souverain-class ship of the line	Noel Pomet	Toulon	Kingdom of France	For French Navy
6 July	Onondaga	Sloop of war		Fort Niagara, New York	Thirteen Colonies	For Royal Navy.
14 July	Quebec	Niger-class frigate	John Barnard	Harwich	Great Britain	For Royal Navy.
28 August	Essex	Essex-class ship of the line	Wells and Stanton	Rotherhithe	Great Britain	For Royal Navy.
6 September	Gamla	Unrated poyama		Stralsund	(Sweden) Swedish Pomerania	For Royal Swedish Navy.
27 October	Superb	Bellona-class ship of the line	Adam Hayes	Deptford Dockyard	Great Britain	For Royal Navy.
6 December	Ferret	Sloop of war	Wells Stanton	Chatham Dockyard	Great Britain	For Royal Navy.
24 December	Senegal	Beaver-class sloop	Henry Bird	Rotherhithe	Great Britain	For Royal Navy.
Unknown date	Earl of Elgin	East Indiaman	John Perry	Blackwall Yard	Great Britain	For British East India Company.
Unknown date	Friendship	Cutter			Great Britain	For private owner.
Unknown date	Jylland	Third rate			Denmark-Norway	For Dano-Norwegian Navy.
Unknown date	Danae	Légère-class gunboat		Havre de Grâce	Kingdom of France	For French Navy.
Unknown date	Légère	Légère-class gunboat		Havre de Grâce	Kingdom of France	For French Navy.
Unknown date	Victoire	Légère-class gunboat		Havre de Grâce	Kingdom of France	For French Navy.
Unknown date	Le Bertin	Bertin-class East Indiaman	Chevallier Antoine Groignard	Lorient	Kingdom of France	For Compagnie des Indes.
Unknown date	Le Jason	Privateer			Kingdom of France	For private owner.
Unknown date	L'Entreprenant	Privateer			Kingdom of France	For private owner.
Unknown date	Mercury	Schooner		Oswego, New York	Thirteen Colonies	For Royal Navy.
Unknown date	Mississisauga	Sloop of war		Oswego, New York	Thirteen Colonies	For Royal Navy.
Unknown date	Nassau Weilburg	Fourth rate	John May	Amsterdam	Dutch Republic	For Dutch Navy.
Unknown date	Plassey	East Indiaman			Great Britain	For British East India Company.
Unknown date	Tılsım-ı Bahri	Fifth rate		Rhodes	Ottoman Greece	For Ottoman Navy.
Unknown date	Valkyrien	Fourth rate			Denmark-Norway	For Dano-Norwegian Navy.
Unknown date	Victorioso	Principe-class ship of the line	Juan Donesteve	Guarnizo	Spain	For Spanish Navy.
Unknown date	Zephir	Unrated full-rigged ship	L van Zwijndrecht	Rotterdam	Dutch Republic	For Dutch Navy.
