= HMS Bellona (1760) =

Ship of the line of the Royal Navy

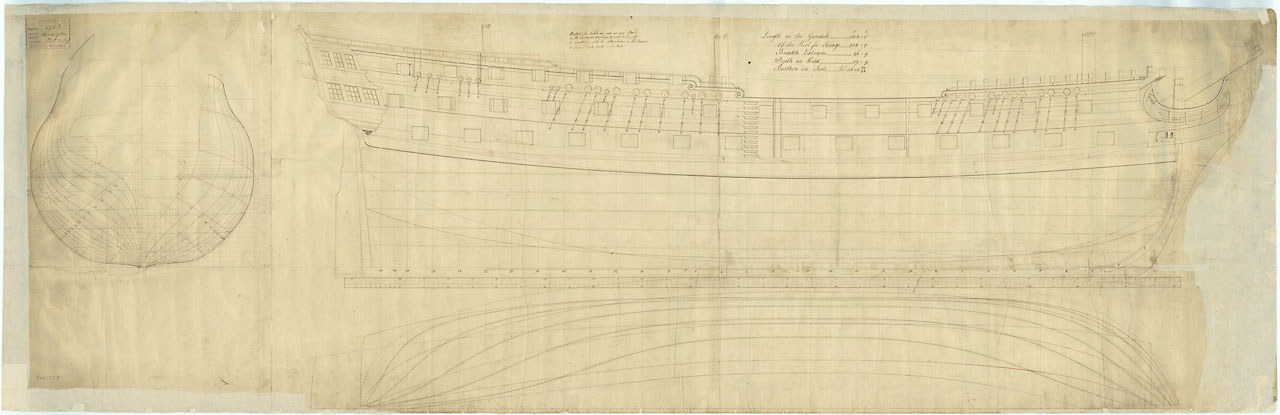
- Bellona

History

Great Britain
- Name: HMS Bellona
- Ordered: 28 December 1757
- Builder: Chatham Dockyard
- Laid down: 10 May 1758
- Launched: 19 February 1760
- Commissioned: 22 February 1760
- Honours and awards: Battle of Copenhagen
- Fate: Broken up, 1814

General characteristics
- Class & type: Bellona-class 74-gun ship of the line
- Tons burthen: 1615 bm
- Length: 168 ft (51 m) (gundeck); 138 ft (42 m) (keel)
- Beam: 46 ft 11 in (14.30 m)
- Draught: 21 ft 6 in (6.55 m)
- Depth of hold: 19 ft 9 in (6.02 m)
- Propulsion: Sails
- Sail plan: Full-rigged ship
- Complement: 650 officers and men
- Armament: Lower gundeck: 28 × 32-pounder guns; Upper gundeck: 28 × 18-pounder guns; QD: 14 × 9-pounder guns; Fc: 4 × 9-pounder guns

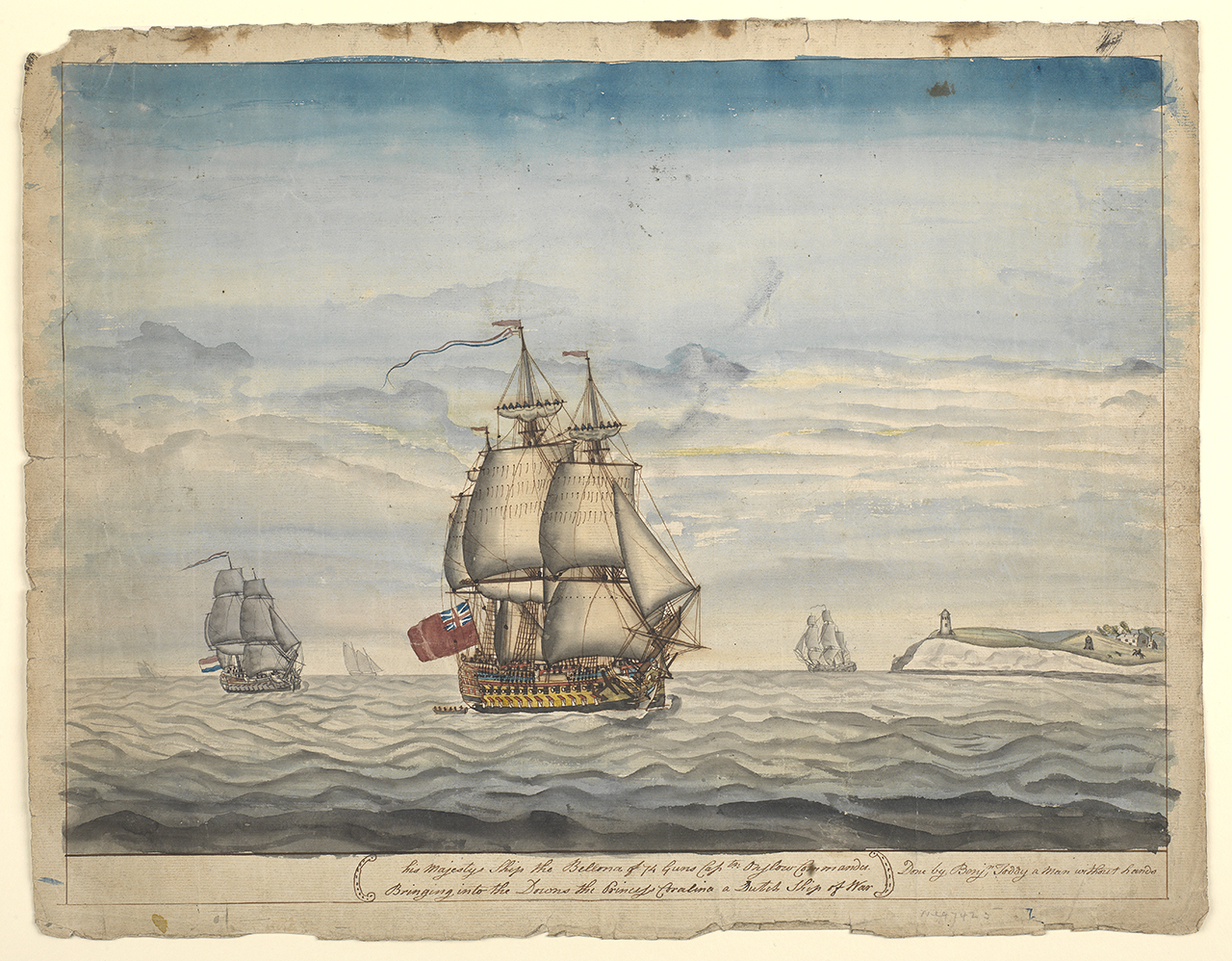
Bellona in the English Channel with the Dutch prize Princes Carolina

HMS Bellona was a 74-gun Bellona-class third-rate ship of the line of the Royal Navy. Designed by Sir Thomas Slade, she was one of three ships ordered on 28 December 1757 to be built to Slade's design - the Bellona at Chatham by Master Shipwright John Lock and the other two, HMS Dragon and HMS Superb, at Deptford Dockyard. She was a prototype for the iconic 74-gun ships of the latter part of the 18th century. "The design of the Bellona class was never repeated precisely, but Slade experimented slightly with the lines, and the Arrogant, Ramillies, Egmont, and Elizabeth classes were almost identical in size, layout, and structure, and had only slight variations in the shape of the underwater hull. The Culloden-class ship of the line was also similar, but slightly larger. Thus over forty ships were near-sisters of the Bellona."

The ship was named after the Roman goddess of war, Bellona.

Bellona was built at Chatham Dockyard, given her name on 1 February 1758, had her keel laid down on 10 May 1758, and was launched on 19 February 1760, and commissioned three days later, although she was not finally completed until 6 April. She was the second ship of the Royal Navy to bear the name, and saw service in the Seven Years' War, American Revolutionary War and the Napoleonic Wars.

She was captained from 1760 to 1762 by Robert (Bob) Faulknor the elder (father of the naval hero Robert Faulknor the younger).

Bellona left to join the squadron blockading Brest (this being the Seven Years' War) on 8 April 1760. She was later detached to patrol off the Tagus River in Spain, and on 13 August, while sailing with the frigate Brilliant, she sighted the French 74-gun ship Courageux in company with two frigates. The British ships pursued, and after 14 hours, caught up with the French ships and engaged them at the Battle of Cape Finisterre (1761), the Brilliant attacking the frigates, and Bellona taking on the Courageux. The frigates eventually got away, but the Courageux struck her colours, and was later repaired and taken into the Royal Navy.

In 1762, Bellona was paid off and did not see action again until 1780, when on 30 December, under command of Captain Richard Onslow, along with Captain Taylor Penny on HMS Marlborough they captured the 54-gun Dutch ship Princess Carolina. She then from 1781 saw action during the American Revolutionary War. She was coppered at this time, one of the first British ships to receive the hull-protecting layer. Until 1783 she cruised in the North Sea and the West Indies, and participated in reliefs of Gibraltar.

Bellona was once again paid off, recommissioned briefly in 1789 in expectation of war with Russia, but did not get into action again until 1793, when she went to the West Indies.

On 10 January 1797, Bellona and Babet drove a small French privateer schooner ashore on Deseada. They tried to use the privateer Legere, of six guns and 48 men, which Bellona had captured three days earlier, to retrieve the schooner that was on shore. In the effort, both French privateers were destroyed. Then Babet chased a brig, which had been a prize to the schooner, ashore. The British were unable to get her off so they destroyed her. Babet and Bellona were paid Prize money in 1828, more than 30 years later.

Bellona took part in the action of 18 June 1799, securing the surrender of the frigates Junon and Alceste, and helping HMS Centaur in capturing Courageuse.

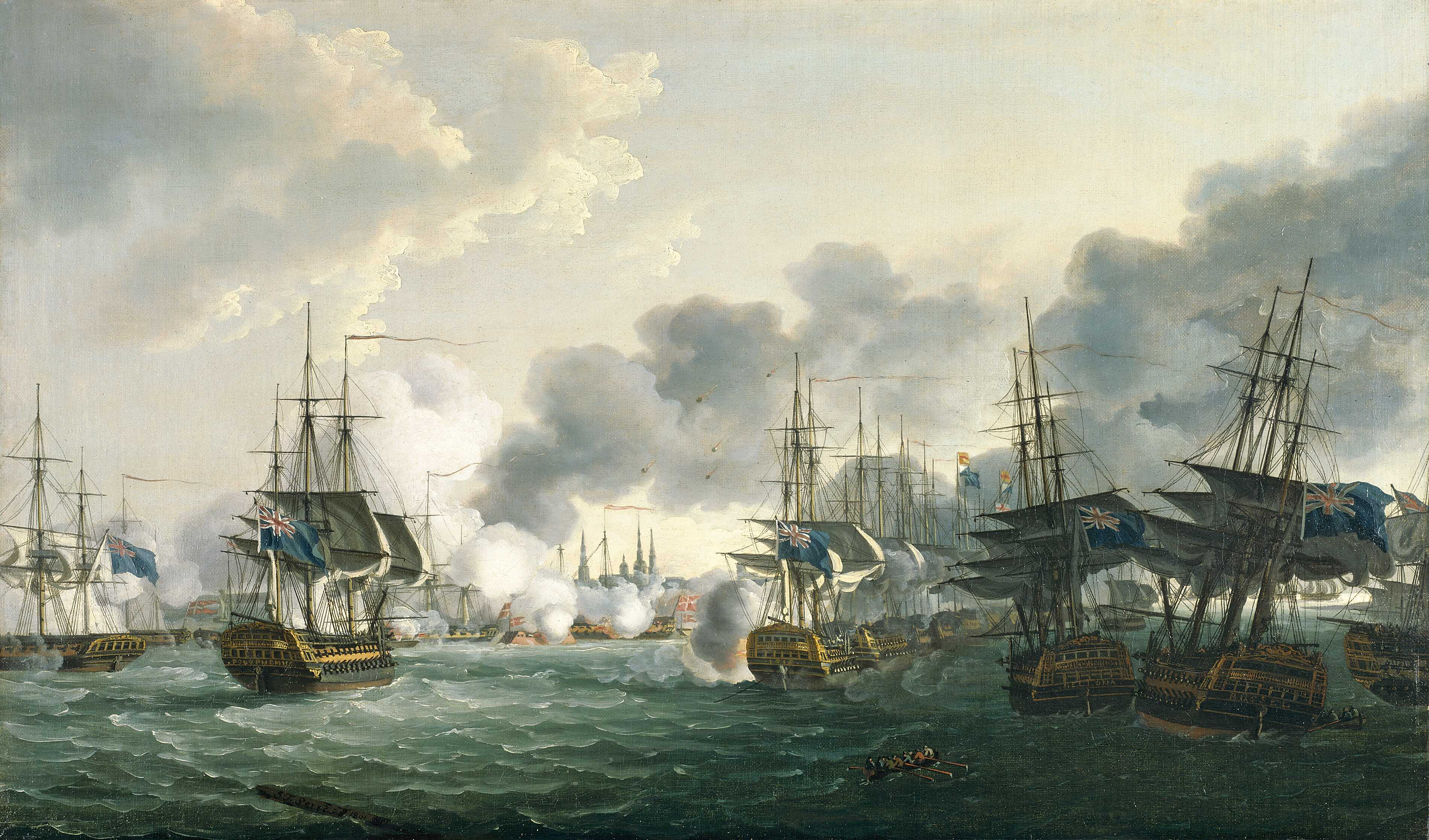
Bellona at Copenhagen, 1801

In 1801, she was in the Battle of Copenhagen, participating despite having grounded on a shoal. She continued to serve in the North Sea and Bay of Biscay until 1814, when she paid off for the last time and was broken up, having served in the navy for over 50 years, an unusually long time for one of the old wooden ships.

== Bellona in fiction ==
Bellona appears in the Patrick O'Brian novels The Commodore and The Yellow Admiral as the pennant ship of a squadron led by the character Jack Aubrey.
