= Adam Hayes =

18th-century English shipwright

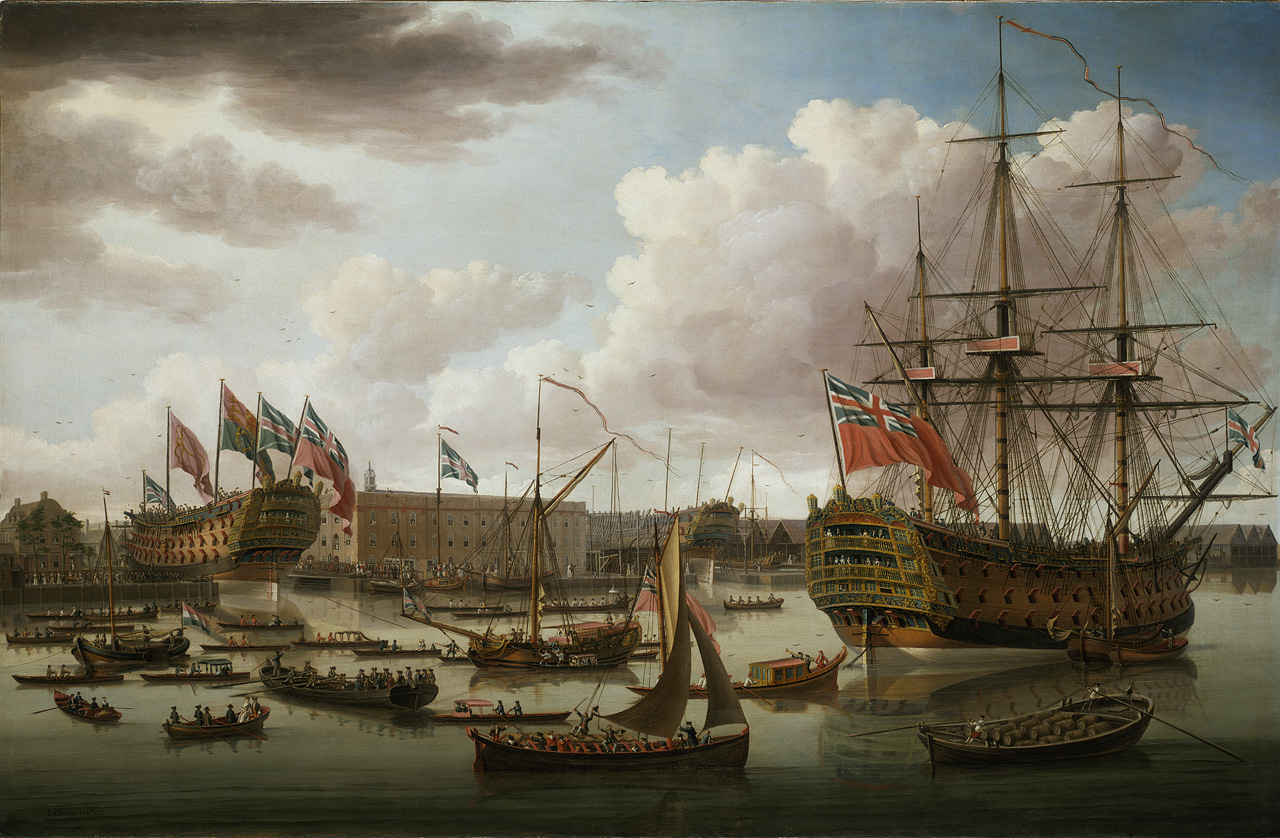
The launch of HMS Cambridge (left) at Deptford Dockyard in 1755

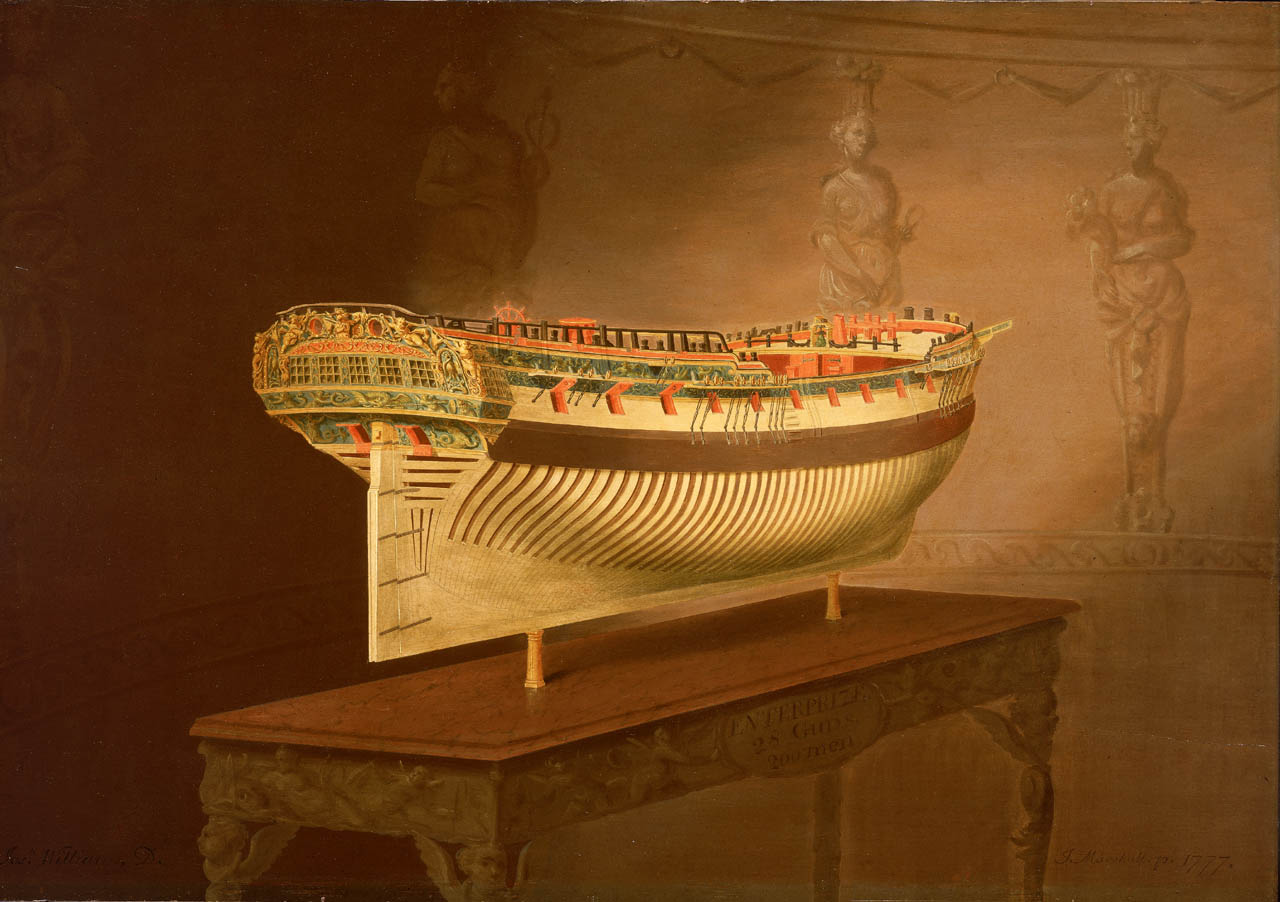
Model of HMS Enterprise by Hayes

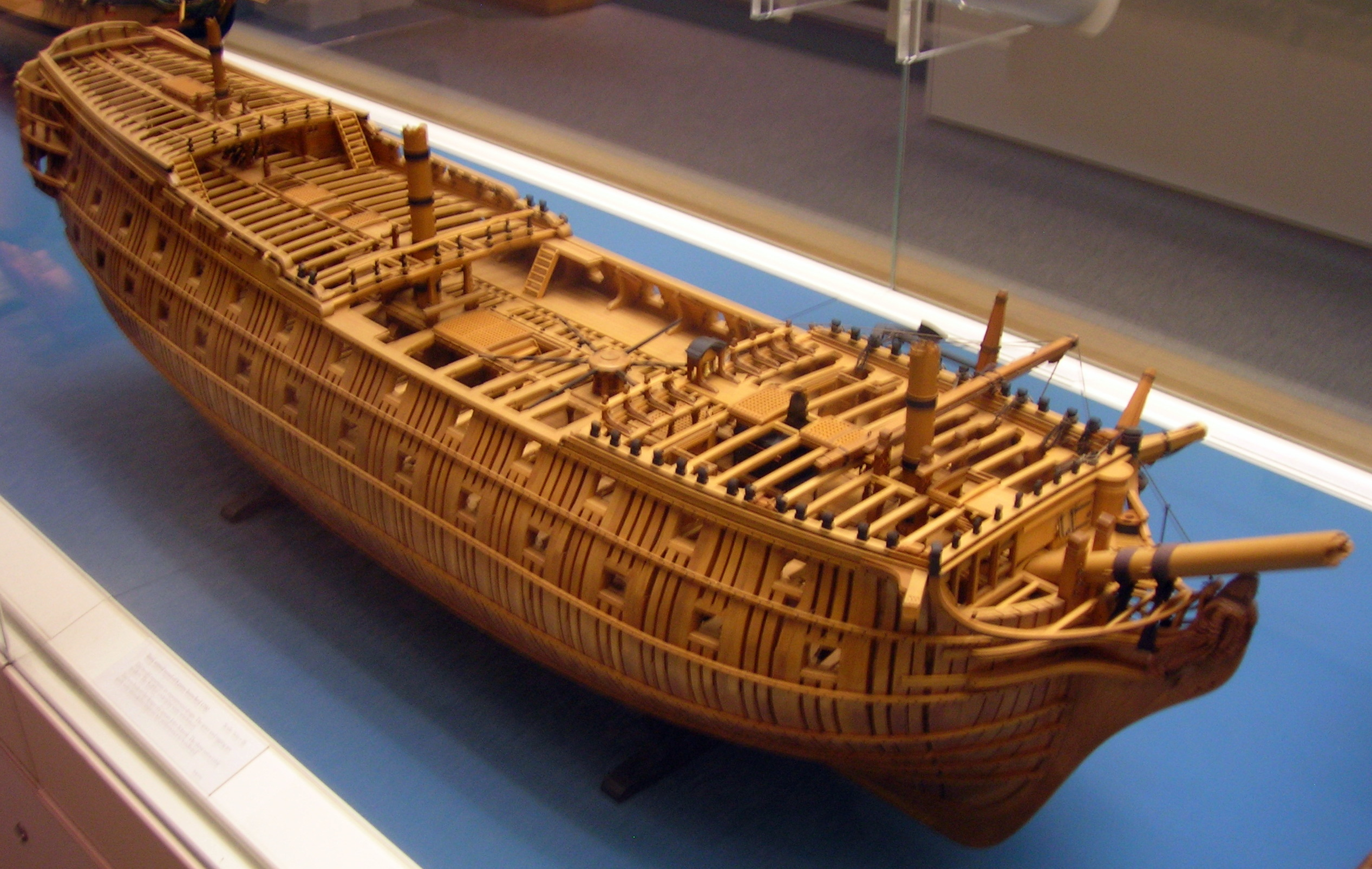
Model of HMS Egremont at National Maritime Museum by Hayes

Adam Hayes (1710 – 20 December 1785) was an English shipwright who worked for the Royal Navy. A great number of his models survive. He was responsible for the selection of the ship the Earl of Pembroke and was the wright who converted it into HMS Endeavour in 1768 for use by Captain Cook.

== Life ==
He was born in the parish of St Botolph's, Aldgate in east London, the son of Adam Hayes and his wife, Sarah Urmstone. His father was a haberdasher. He joined the Royal Navy as a boy, around 1722, and became ship's carpenter.

In 1740 he was part of the crew on HMS Centurion under Captain George Anson as flagship of a part of a special fleet heading first to South America then around Cape Horn in March 1741 and into the Pacific. The overall objective was then to attack the Spanish colony at Manila in the Philippines on the far side of the ocean. The Spanish got wind of this and sent their own fleet to intercept. As part of the actions the Centurion captured and plundered the Spanish galleon Nuestra Senora de Covadonga in 1743. By tradition, the crew all shared part of the treasure gained. They returned to England in June 1744. Hayes transferred to work on HMS Kent: it is unclear if this was to break the old HMS Kent at Chatham (the ship was over 60 years old) or to build the new HMS Kent at Deptford, but it appears to have been a dock-based employment either way. The latter is more likely, and appears to have led both to recognition of his skills and permanent shore-based employment. He was therefore in Deptford 1744 to 1746 – until the launch of HMS Kent.

The process of shipbuilding in those days (and still) involves first making a scale model of the ship, and this would be part of the master shipwright's duties: a great number of Hayes' models survive.

From 1746 to 1748 he was assistant master shipwright at Gibraltar Docks and in 1748 returned to England as master mastmaker at Chatham Dockyard from April 1748 to May 1749. From May 1749 to November 1750 he was assistant master shipwright at Plymouth Dockyard. He was then at Woolwich Dockyard for 8 months before being promoted to master shipwright at Sheerness Dockyard, where he spent 11 months before returning the Woolwich as master shipwright in June 1752, from which point the Royal Navy lists his projects.

From March 1753 to August 1755 he was master shipwright at Chatham before moving permanently to a settled position at Deptford. In Deptford, over the next 30 years, he produced a very large number of ships, including a dozen ships of the line.

He died in Deptford on 20 December 1785. He is buried in St Mary's Church in Newington (Kennington).

== Captain Cook connection ==
In 1768 it was Hayes who was chosen by the Admiralty and Royal Society to select a vessel suitable for exploration of the southern hemisphere and to convert said ship (before Cook was chosen as captain). For various reasons it was not possible to select an existing Royal Navy vessel nor to commission on that basis.

Hayes selected the Earl of Pembroke, privately owned and moored at Shadwell. She had been built at Whitby in 1764. Hayes oversaw the refitting at Deptford and relaunched the ship under the name HMS Endeavour. The refit took only around three months. She was delivered to him on 5 April and relaunched on 21 July 1768. As the ship was designed originally to carry coal, a large amount of ballast had to be added to get the ship to handle as intended.

She was registered as a Royal Navy ship as a "bark" (barque) of 368 tons under the name HMS Endeavour. The choice of name appears to derive from the Middlesex election affair of 1768, where John Wilkes repeatedly used the term "endeavour".

== Ships built ==
- HMS Ranger (1752) an 8-gun sloop at Woolwich
- HMS Wolf (1754) an 8-gun sloop at Chatham
- HMS Cambridge (1755) an 80-gun ship of the line
- HMS Deal Castle (1756) 20-gun
- HMS Bideford (1756) 20-gun
- HMS Preston (1757) 50-gun ship of the line
- HMS Dublin (1757) 74-gun ship of the line
- HMS Shannon (1757) 28-gun frigate
- HMS Norfolk (1757) 74-gun ship of the line
- HMS Sapphire (1758) 32-gun frigate
- HMS Hercules (1759) 74-gun ship of the line
- HMS Dragon (1760) 74-gun ship of the line
- HMS Superb (1760) 74-gun ship of the line
- HMS Kent (1762) 74-gun ship of the line
- HMS Albion (1763) 74-gun ship of the line
- HMS Lurcher (1763) 6-gun cutter
- HMS Kite (1764) 4-gun cutter
- HMS Monarch (1765) 74-gun ship of the line
- HMS Magnificent (1766) 74-gun ship of the line
- HMS Marlborough (1767) 74-gun ship of the line
- HMS Otter (1767) 14-gun sloop
- HMS Egmont (1768) 74-gun ship of the line
- HMS Swallow (1769) 14-gun sloop
- Royal Navy launch Close (1770)
- HMS Resolution (1770) 74-gun ship of the line
- HMS Grafton (1771) 74-gun ship of the line
- Armed Yacht Princess Augusta (1773) 6-gun
- Longboat Storehouse (1774)
- HMS Cumberland (1774) 74-gun ship of the line
- HMS Enterprise (1774) 28-gun frigate
- HMS Galatea (1776) 20-gun ship
- HMS Culloden (1776) 74-gun ship of the line
- HMS America (1777) 64-gun ship of the line
- HMS Alexander (1778) 74-gun ship of the line
- HMS Pegasus (1779) 28-gun frigate
- HMS Alcide (1779) 74-gun ship of the line
- HMS Myrmidon (1779) 22-gun post ship
- HMS Flora (1780) 36-gun frigate
- HMS Magnanime (1780) 64-gun ship of the line
- HMS Myrmidon (1781) 22-gun post ship
- HMS Goliath (1781) 74-gun ship of the line
- HMS Standard (1782) 64-gun ship of the line

== Family ==
He was married to Elizabeth Hayes (1714–1758). They had no children. Hayes was great uncle to Rear Admiral Sir John Hayes.
