= Edward Vernon (Royal Navy officer, born 1723) =

Royal Navy Admiral (1723–1794)

Admiral Sir Edward Vernon
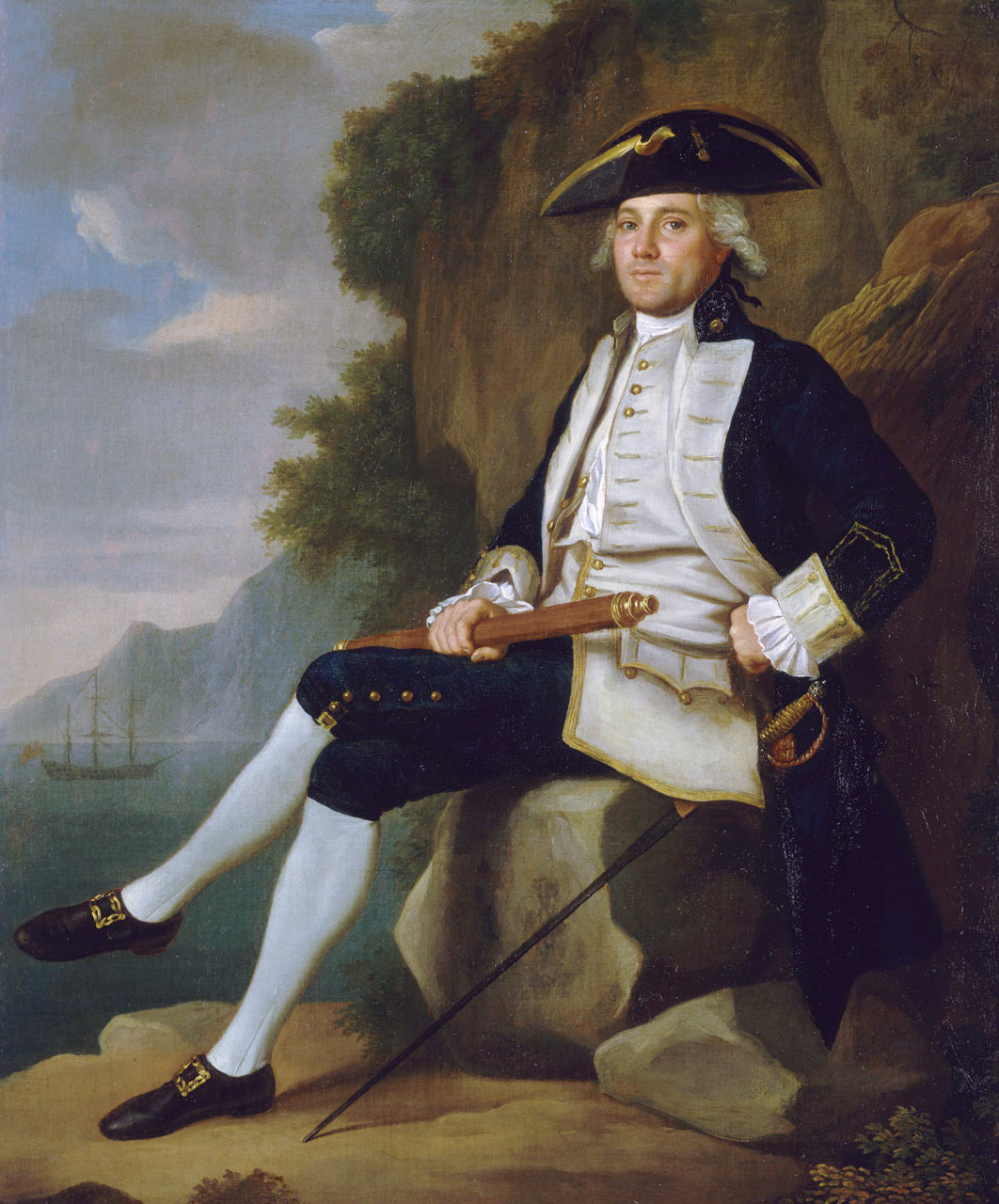
- Captain Edward Vernon (Francis Hayman)
- Born: 30 October 1723
- Died: 16 June 1794 (aged 70)
- Military career
- Allegiance: Kingdom of Great Britain
- Branch: Royal Navy
- Rank: Admiral
- Commands: HMS Baltimore; HMS Mermaid; HMS Lyme; HMS St Albans; HMS Revenge; HMS Kent; HMS Yarmouth; HMS Bellona; HMS Barfleur; HMS Ramillies; Nore Command; East Indies Station
- Conflicts: War of the Austrian Succession; Seven Years' War

Admiral Sir Edward Vernon (30 October 1723 – 16 June 1794) was a Royal Navy officer who became Commander-in-Chief of the East Indies Station.

== Naval career ==
Born the fourth son of Henry Vernon and Penelope Vernon (née Phillips) and educated at the Royal Naval Academy at Portsmouth, Vernon joined the Royal Navy in 1739 when he was appointed a Volunteer-per-order on Portland. He was promoted to lieutenant in 1743 during the War of the Austrian Succession and assigned to the 70-gun Berwick under Captain Edward Hawke. Present at the Battle of Toulon in 1744 against a combined French and Spanish fleet, he and 22 other British seamen were sent by Hawke aboard the disabled enemy vessel Poder in order to secure her as a prize. Poder was heavily damaged, and Vernon and others began jury rigging masts in order to make her ready to sail. They neglected to observe a Spanish counter-attack and were captured.

Vernon was returned to British service as part of a prisoner exchange, and in 1747 was appointed as commander of the sloop HMS Baltimore. In 1753 he was promoted to captain of Mermaid in 1753 and captain of Lyme in 1755. He went on to be captain of St Albans and was present at the destruction of the French Fleet at the Battle of Lagos on 18–19 August 1759. He went on to command successively Revenge, Kent, Yarmouth, Bellona, Britannia and Ramillies. Knighted in June 1773, he became Commander-in-Chief, The Nore in 1775 and Commander-in-Chief of the East Indies Station in 1776 and took part in an indecisive action off Pondicherry on 10 August 1778 which at least forced the French fleet to retire to Mauritius, much booty and plunder having been seized by the British. Promoted to rear-admiral in March 1779, he returned to England in 1781. He was promoted to vice-admiral in 1787 and admiral in 1794. A monument to Vernon was placed in All Saints Church, at Binfield in Berkshire.

Military offices
Preceded by Edward Hughes	Commander-in-Chief, East Indies Station; 1776–1780	Succeeded by Edward Hughes
