= HMS Kent (1762) =

18th century 74-gun third rate ship of the line of the Royal Navy

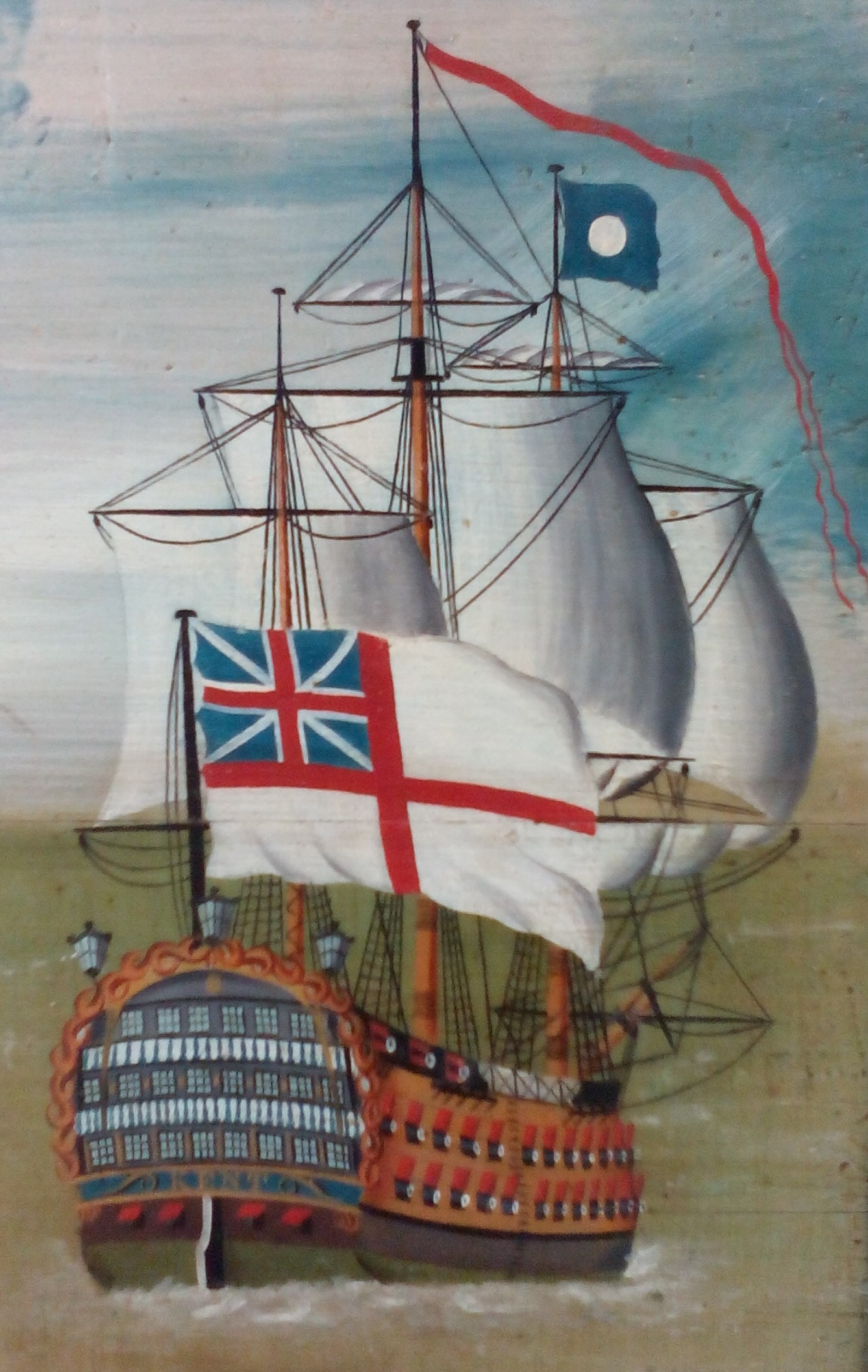
- HMS Kent flying the White Ensign (including the pre-1801 Union Flag), from 'The Fleet Offshore' (1780–1790), a piece of anonymous folk art now at Compton Verney Art Gallery.

History

Great Britain
- Name: HMS Kent
- Ordered: 20 March 1759
- Builder: Deptford Dockyard
- Launched: 23 March 1762
- Fate: Sold out of the service, 1784

General characteristics
- Class & type: Bellona-class ship of the line
- Tons burthen: 1,61725/94 (bm)
- Length: 168 ft (51 m) (gundeck)
- Beam: 46 ft 9 in (14.25 m)
- Draught: 21 ft 6 in (6.55 m)
- Depth of hold: 19 ft 9 in (6.02 m)
- Propulsion: Sails
- Sail plan: Full-rigged ship
- Armament: 74 guns: Gundeck: 28 × 32 pdrs; Upper gundeck: 28 × 18 pdrs; Quarterdeck: 14 × 9 pdrs; Forecastle: 4 × 9 pdrs

HMS Kent was a 74-gun Bellona-class third-rate ship of the line of the Royal Navy, designed by Sir Thomas Slade and built by Adam Hayes at Deptford Dockyard and launched on 23 March 1762 .

== Service history ==
She was launched at a cost of £40,000.

In 1774, a chest containing perhaps as much as 400 lb (180 kg) of gunpowder exploded during saluting, killing eleven and injuring 34, and causing the marine drummer sitting on the chest to be blown overboard. The marine reportedly suffered no injuries as a result. In 1775 Kent was briefly under the command of John Jervis.

She was sold out of the service at Plymouth in 1784 for £600.

== Notable Commanders ==
- Captain Robert Faulknor 1762/3
- Captain Edward Vernon briefly in 1763
- Captain Charles Fielding 1772 to 1775
- Captain John Jervis briefly in 1775
- Captain James Cook 1775

== Bibliography ==
- Lavery, Brian (1983) The Ship of the Line – Volume 1: The development of the battlefleet 1650–1850. Conway Maritime Press. ISBN 0-85177-252-8.
- Michael Phillips. Kent (74) (1762). Michael Phillips' Ships of the Old Navy. Retrieved 15 November 2008.
- Winfield, Rif (2007). British Warships in the Age of Sail, 1714 to 1792. London: Seaforth Publishing. ISBN 9781844157006.
