= Ramillies-class ship of the line =

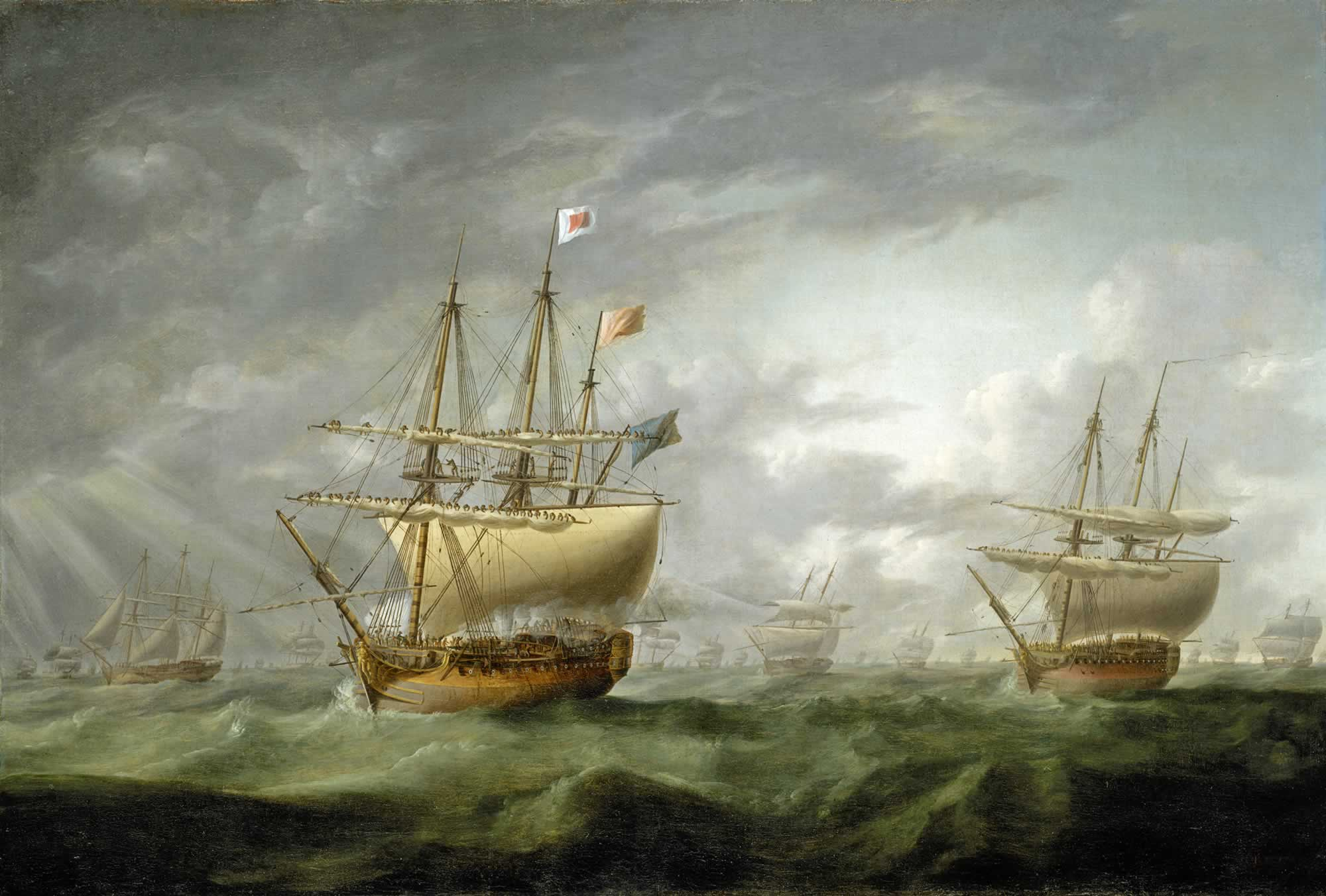
- Loss of HMS Ramillies by Robert Dodd

Class overview
- Name: Ramillies class
- Operators: Royal Navy
- Preceded by: Canada class
- Succeeded by: Albion class
- In service: 4 September 1762 – 1817
- Completed: 9
- Lost: 5

General characteristics (original design, as built)
- Type: Ship of the line
- Tons burthen: 1,60753/94 (bm)
- Length: 168 ft 6 in (51.4 m) (gundeck)
- Beam: 46 ft 9 in (14.2 m)
- Depth of hold: 19 ft 9 in (6.0 m)
- Propulsion: Sails
- Sail plan: Full-rigged ship
- Complement: 550
- Armament: 74 muzzle-loading, smoothbore guns: Lower gundeck: 28 × 32 pdr guns; Upper gundeck: 28 × 18 pdr guns; Forecastle: 4 × 9 pdr guns; Quarter deck: 14 × 9 pdr guns

The Ramillies-class ships of the line were a class of nine 74-gun third rates, designed for the Royal Navy by Sir Thomas Slade.

== Design ==
The draught for the Ramillies class was very similar to that of the Bellona class and subsequent Arrogant class, with the only real differences to be found in the shape of the underwater hull. There were two distinct sub-groups; four ships were built in the Royal Dockyards to the original design, approved on 25 April 1760 – although the name-ship Ramillies had originally been ordered as a Bellona-class unit. Slade subsequently amended his design for the ships which were to be built by commercial contractors – this modified design, with slightly amended dimensions, being approved on 13 January 1761.

== Ships ==
=== First group ===
Dockyard-built ships:

- HMS Ramillies

Builder: Chatham Dockyard
Ordered: 1 December 1759
Laid down: 25 August 1760
Launched: 25 April 1763
Completed: November 1763
Fate: Abandoned and burned off Newfoundland, 21 September 1782.

- HMS Monarch

Builder: Deptford Dockyard
Ordered: 22 November 1760
Laid down: 2 June 1761
Launched: 20 July 1765
Completed: 24 September 1765
Fate: Broken up at Chatham, March 1813

- HMS Magnificent

Builder: Deptford Dockyard
Ordered: 16 December 1761
Laid down: 15 April 1762
Launched: 20 September 1767
Completed: September 1778
Fate: Wrecked off Brest, 25 March 1804.

- HMS Marlborough

Builder: Deptford Dockyard
Ordered: 4 December 1762
Laid down: 3 June 1763
Launched: 26 August 1767
Completed: 1 December 1767
Fate: Wrecked off Belle Île, 4 November 1800

=== Second (modified) group ===
Contract-built ships:

- HMS Terrible

Builder: John Barnard, Harwich
Ordered: 1 January 1761
Laid down: February 1761
Launched: 4 September 1762
Completed: 18 December 1762
Fate: Burned following the Battle of the Chesapeake, 11 September 1781

- HMS Russell

Builder: Thomas West, Deptford
Ordered: 1 January 1761
Laid down: June 1761
Launched: 10 November 1764
Completed: 6 January 1765 at Woolwich Dockyard
Fate: Sold out of the service in the East Indies, 1811

- HMS Invincible

Builder: John and William Wells, Deptford
Ordered: 12 October 1761
Laid down: December 1761
Launched: 9 March 1765
Completed: February 1777 at Chatham Dockyard.
Fate: Wrecked off Yarmouth, 16 March 1801

- HMS Robust

Builder: John Barnard, Harwich
Ordered: 16 December 1761
Laid down: February 1762
Launched: 25 October 1764
Completed: 10 December 1764
Fate: Broken up at Portsmouth, January 1817

- HMS Prince of Wales

Builder: Henry Bird and Roger Fisher, Milford Haven
Ordered: 16 December 1762
Laid down: March 1762
Launched: 4 June 1765
Completed: 22 December 1770 at Plymouth Dockyard
Fate: Broken up at Plymouth, August 1783
