= HMS Excellent (1787) =

74-gun Royal Navy ship of the line

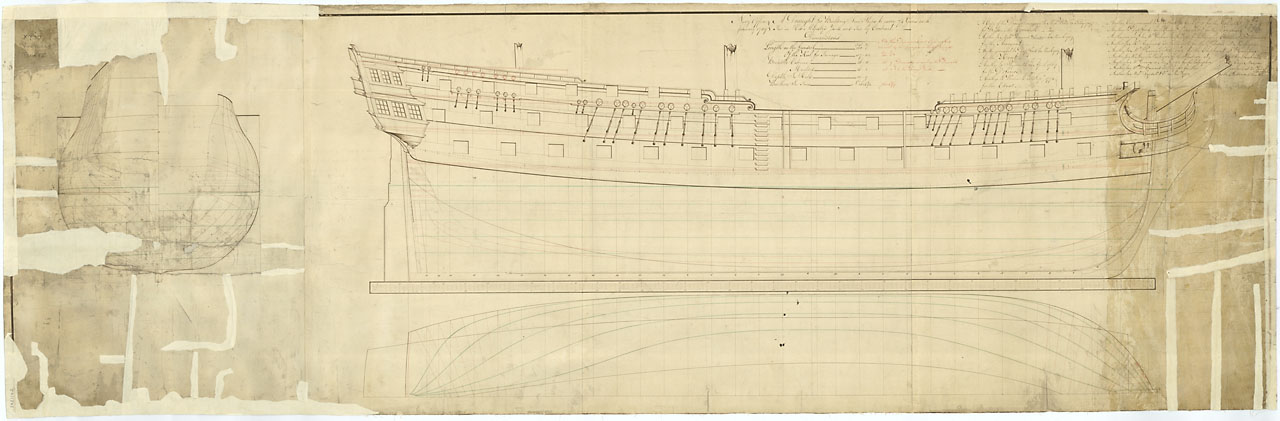
- Excellent

History

Great Britain
- Name: Excellent
- Ordered: 9 August 1781
- Builder: Graham, Harwich
- Laid down: March 1782
- Launched: 27 November 1787
- Honours and awards: Battle of Cape St Vincent
- Fate: Broken up, 1835
- Notes: Reduced to 58-guns in 1820; training ship from 1830

General characteristics
- Class & type: Arrogant-class ship of the line
- Tons burthen: 1,615 71/94 (bm)
- Length: 168 ft (51.2 m) (gundeck)
- Beam: 46 ft 11 in (14.3 m)
- Depth of hold: 19 ft 9 in (6.0 m)
- Propulsion: Sails
- Sail plan: Full-rigged ship
- Complement: 600
- Armament: 74 muzzle-loading, smoothbore guns: Lower gundeck: 28 × 32 pdr guns; Upper gundeck: 28 × 18 pdr guns; Forecastle: 4 × 9 pdr guns; Quarterdeck: 14 × 9 pdr guns

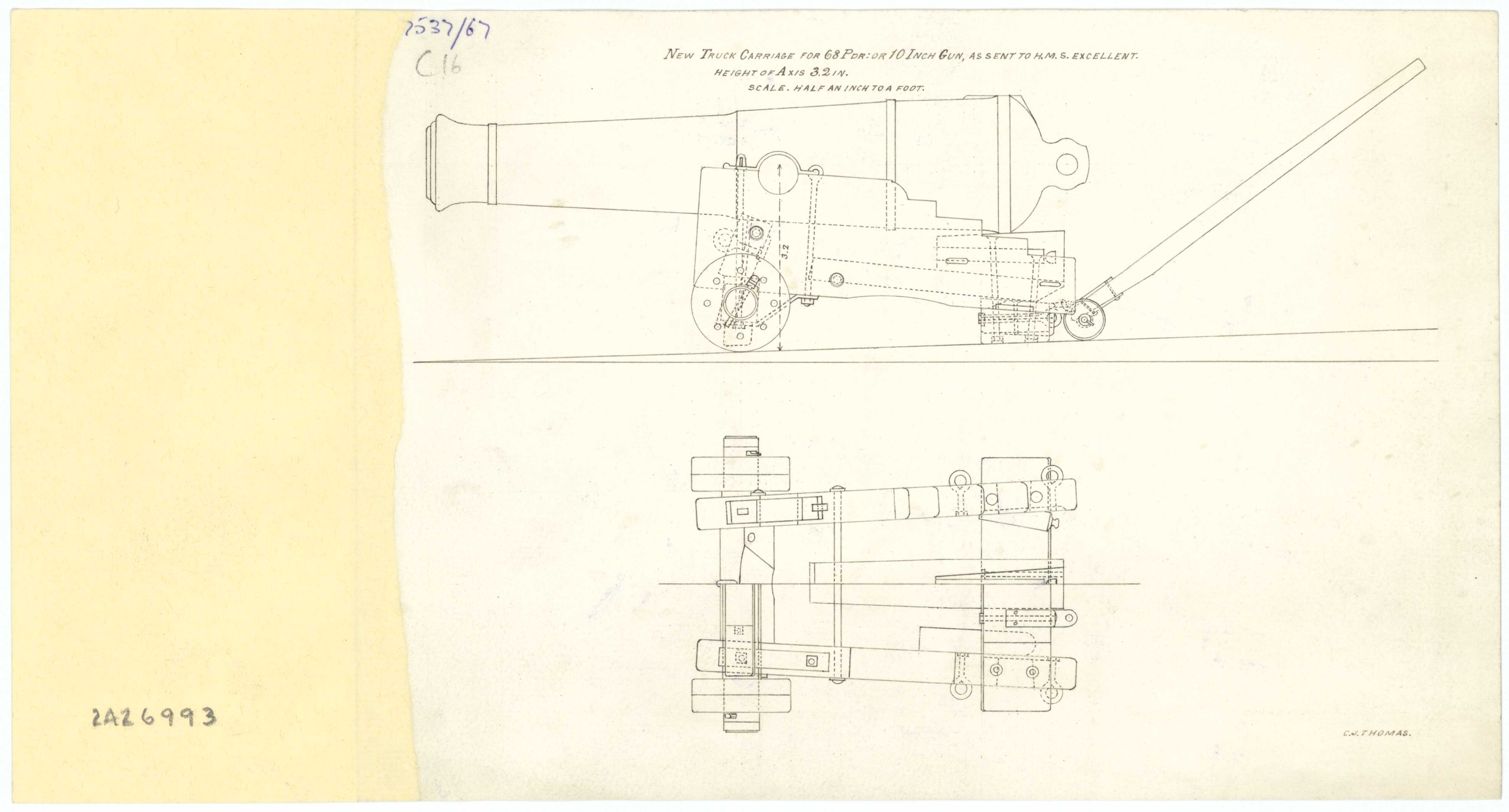
A design for a new truck carriage for a 68-pounder or ten-inch gun sent to HMS Excellent, a 74-gun third rate, two-decker, possible after she was cut down to a 56-gun frigate.

HMS Excellent was a 74-gun third rate Arrogant-class ship of the line built for the Royal Navy during the 1780s. Completed in 1787, she played a minor role in the French Revolutionary Wars and the Napoleonic Wars. She was under repair from 1812 to 1814 and was placed in ordinary upon their completion. The ship was ordered to be razeed into a 58-gun fourth-rate frigate in 1820, but the work did not begin until 1825 and was never completed. Excellent served as a receiving ship from 1825 to 1830 when she was hulked as a gunnery training ship. The ship was broken up in 1835.

== Description ==
The Arrogant-class ship of the line was designed by Sir Thomas Slade, co-Surveyor of the Navy. It was one of the "common" type of 74 with lighter guns than those of the "large" classes. Excellent was one of the slightly modified second batch of Arrogants. She measured 168 feet (51.2 m) on the gundeck and 138 feet (42.1 m) on the keel. She had a beam of 46 feet 11 inches (14.3 m), a depth of hold of 19 feet 9 inches (6.0 m) and had a tonnage of 1,615 71/94 tons burthen. The ships' crew numbered 600 officers and ratings. They were fitted with three masts and were ship-rigged.

The ships were armed with 74 muzzle-loading, smoothbore guns that consisted of twenty-eight 32-pounder guns on their lower gundeck and twenty-eight 18-pounder guns on their upper deck. Their forecastle mounted four 9-pounder guns. On their quarterdeck they carried fourteen 9-pounder guns.

== Construction and career ==
Excellent was the first ship of her name to serve in the Royal Navy. She was ordered on 9 August 1781 and was laid down by Joseph Graham at his shipyard in Harwich on March 1782. The ship was launched on 27 November 1787, completed at Chatham Dockyard in December and placed in ordinary. Excellent was commissioned by Captain John Gell in July 1790.

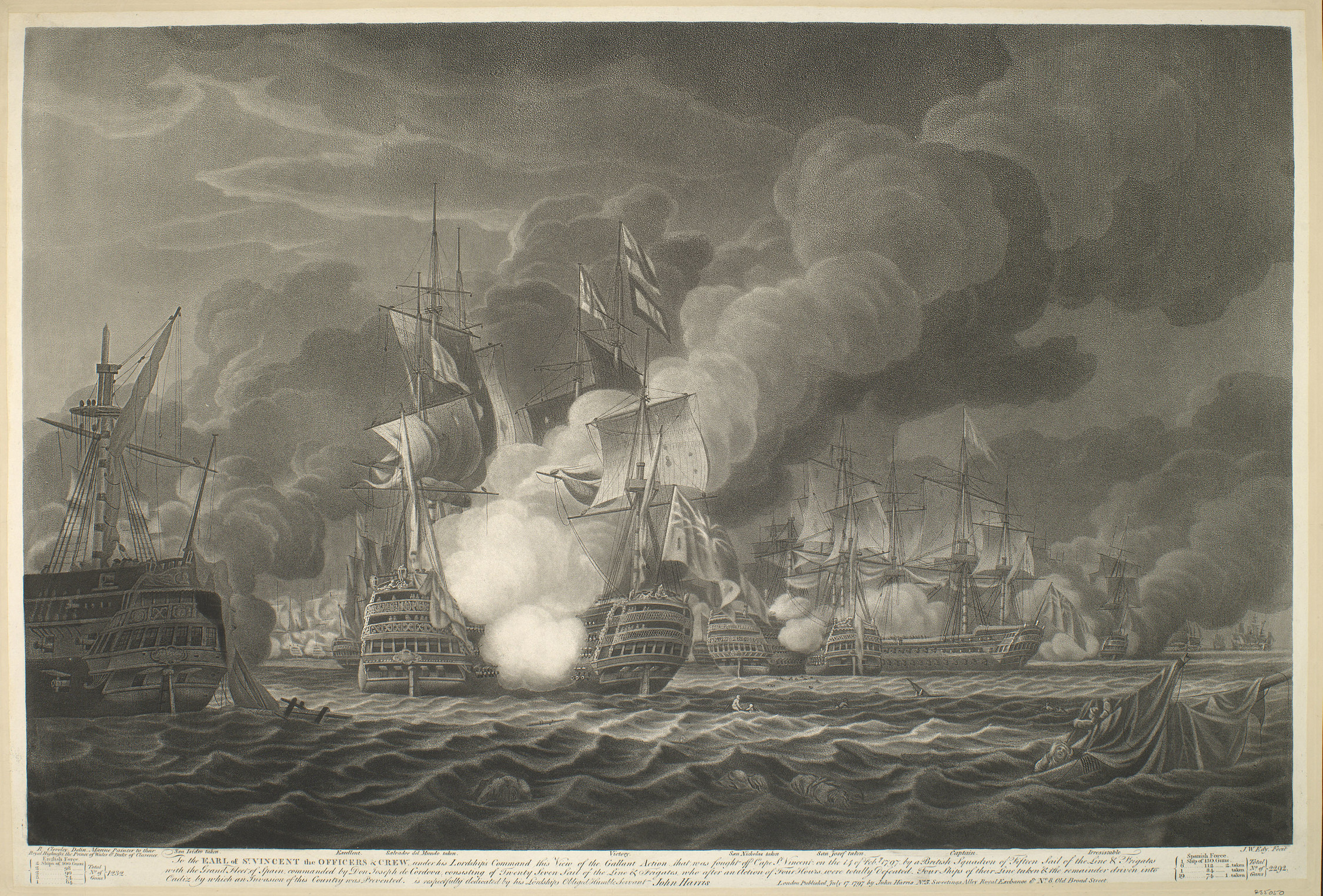
Shows Excellent at Cape St Vincent, 1797

Excellent was at Plymouth on 20 January 1795 and so shared in the proceeds of the detention of the Dutch naval vessels, East Indiamen, and other merchant vessels that were in port on the outbreak of war between Britain and the Netherlands.

Excellent took part in the Battle of Cape St Vincent in 1797.

On 9 October 1799, Excellent chased the 18-gun Aréthuse. Aréthuse attempted to flee but part of her rigging broke during the night, and Excellent caught her. After a brief fight, Aréthuse struck her colours. She was recommissioned in the Royal Navy as HMS Raven.

On 9 April 1802, the 8th West India Regiment revolted in Dominica. They killed three officers, imprisoned the others and took over Fort Shirley. On the following day, Magnificent, which was anchored in Prince Rupert's Bay, sent a party of marines ashore to restore order. The mutineers fired upon the Magnificent with no effect. Excellent, the frigate Severn, and the sloop Gaiete assisted Magnificent, also supplying marines.

On 12 April, Governor Cochrane entered Fort Shirley with the Royal Scots Regiment and the 68th Regiment of Foot. The rebels were drawn up on the Upper Battery of Fort Shirley with three of their officers as prisoners and presented arms to the other troops. They obeyed Cochrane's command to ground their arms but refused his order to step forward. The mutineers picked up their arms and fired a volley. Shots were returned, followed by a bayonet charge that broke their ranks and a close range fire fight ensued. Those mutineers who tried to escape over the precipice to the sea were exposed to grape-shot and canister fire from Magnificent.

The ship was under repair at Portsmouth from January 1812 to January 1814 and was placed in ordinary when completed. On 11 May 1820, Excellent was ordered to be cut down into a 58-gun ship, but work did not begin until December 1825 and appears to have never been completed. She served as a receiving ship at Portsmouth from June 1825 until the ship became a gunnery training hulk in 1830. She was broken up at Deptford Dockyard in October 1835.

== Bibliography ==
- Colledge, J. J.; Warlow, Ben & Bush, Steve (2020). Ships of the Royal Navy: The Complete Record of all Fighting Ships of the Royal Navy from the 15th Century to the Present (5th revised and updated ed.). Seaforth Publishing. ISBN 978-1-5267-9327-0.
- Lavery, Brian (1984). The Ship of the Line. Vol. 1: The Development of the Battlefleet 1650-1850. Naval Institute Press. ISBN 0-85177-252-8.
- Winfield, Rif (2007). British Warships in the Age of Sail 1714–1792: Design, Construction, Careers and Fates. Seaforth Publishing. ISBN 978-1-84415-700-6.
