= HMS Prince of Wales (1765) =

Ship of the line of the Royal Navy

History

Great Britain
- Name: HMS Prince of Wales
- Ordered: 7 January 1762
- Builder: Bird and Fisher, New Milford (now renamed Neyland) Milford Haven, pembrokeshire
- Launched: 4 June 1765
- Fate: Broken up, 1783

General characteristics
- Class & type: Ramillies-class ship of the line
- Tons burthen: 1623 (bm)
- Length: 168 ft 6 in (51.36 m) (gundeck)
- Beam: 46 ft 11 in (14.30 m)
- Depth of hold: 19 ft 9 in (6.02 m)
- Propulsion: Sails
- Sail plan: Full-rigged ship
- Armament: Gundeck: 28 × 32-pounder guns; Upper gundeck: 28 × 18-pounder guns; QD: 14 × 9-pounder guns; Fc: 4 × 9-pounder guns

In action at St Lucia in December 1778. Barrington's flagship 'Prince of Wales', is last in the line, in stern view on the left

HMS Prince of Wales was a 74-gun third rate ship of the line of the Royal Navy, launched on 4 June 1765 at Neyland. She was part of the Ramillies class of ships of the line designed by Sir Thomas Slade.

== Service ==
American Revolution: On 29 June 1777 captured American ship "Lord Camden" near Cape Finisterre, Spain. On 25 May 1778, under command of Captain Benjamin Hill, she captured American schooner "Duc de Choiseul" at (44°59′N 10°31′W). The next day she captured American brig "Gardoqui" at (43°15′N 11°00′W).

She was broken up in 1783.
