= Albion-class ship of the line (1763) =

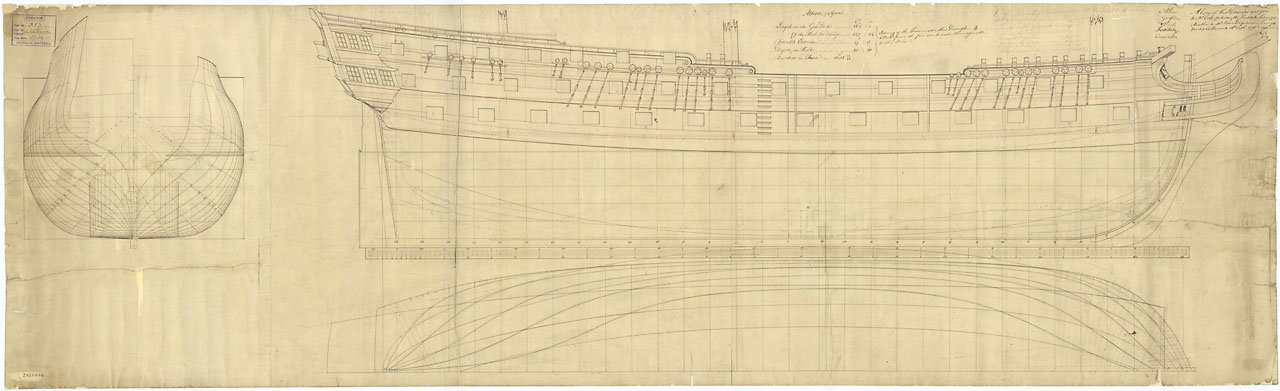
- The body plan, sheer lines, and longitudinal half-breadth for Albion

Class overview
- Name: Albion class
- Operators: Royal Navy
- Preceded by: Ramillies class
- Succeeded by: Elizabeth class
- In service: 1763–1820
- Completed: 5
- Lost: 1
- Retired: 4

General characteristics
- Type: Ship of the line
- Length: 168 ft (51.2 m) (gundeck); 139 ft 3/4 in (42.4 m) (keel)
- Armament: 74 guns: Gundeck: 28 × 32-pounders; Upper gundeck: 28 × 18-pounders; Quarterdeck: 14 × 9-pounders; Forecastle: 4 × 9-pounders

The Albion-class ship of the line were a class of five 74-gun third-rate ships of the line, designed for the Royal Navy by Sir Thomas Slade.

== Design ==
Slade based the design of the Albion class on the lines of the 90-gun ship Neptune.

== Ships ==
- HMS Albion

Builder: Deptford Dockyard
Ordered: 1 December 1759
Launched: 16 May 1763
Fate: Wrecked, 1797

- HMS Grafton

Builder: Deptford Dockyard
Ordered: 22 October 1767
Launched: 26 September 1771
Fate: Broken up, 1816

- HMS Alcide

Builder: Deptford Dockyard
Ordered: 21 August 1774
Launched: 30 July 1779
Fate: Broken up, 1817

- HMS Fortitude

Builder: Randall, Rotherhithe
Ordered: 2 February 1778
Launched: 23 March 1780
Fate: Broken up, 1820

- HMS Irresistible

Builder: Barnard, Harwich
Ordered: 8 July 1778
Launched: 6 December 1782
Fate: Broken up, 1806
