= HMS Sherborne (1763) =

Cutter of the Royal Navy

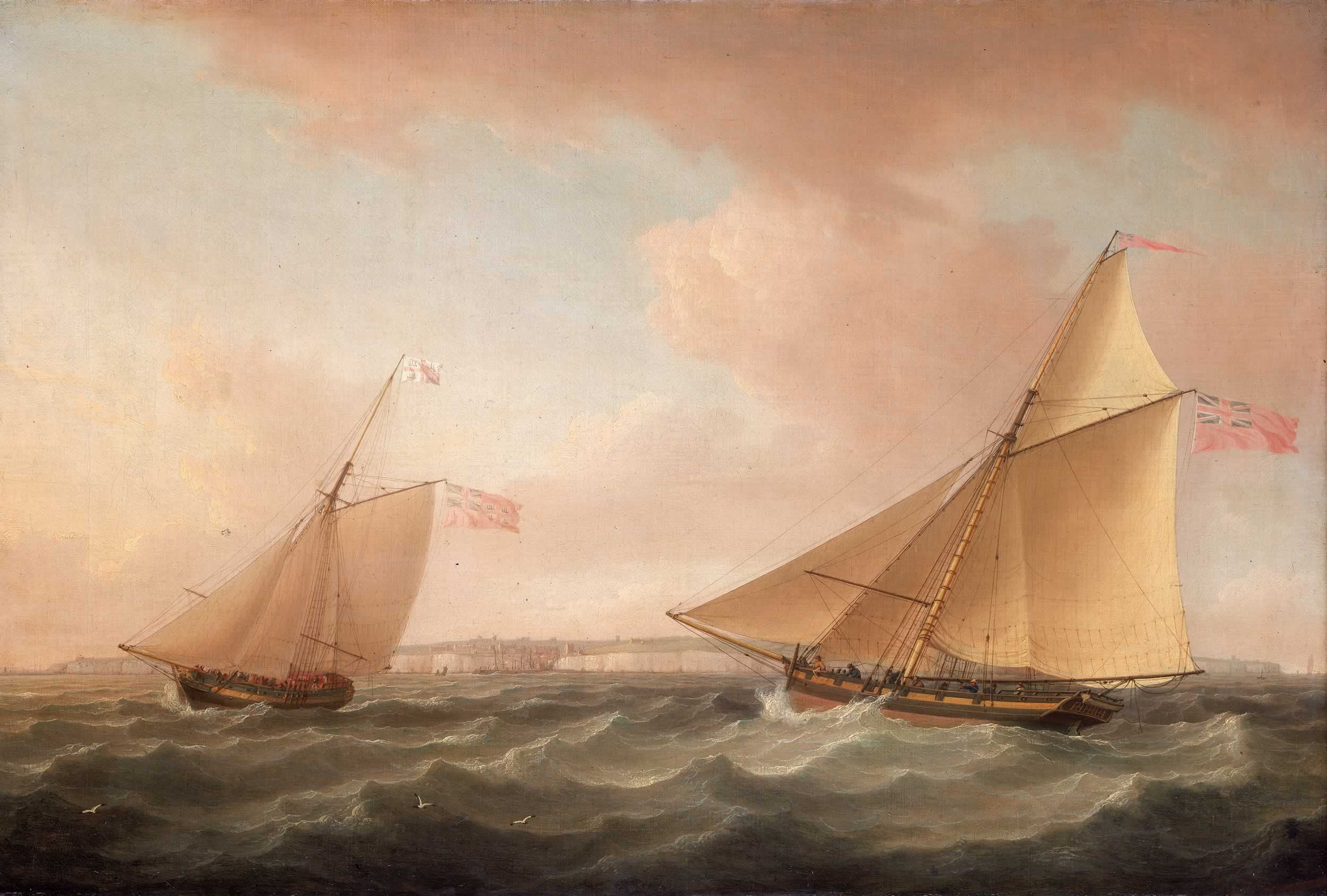
- A Trinity House Yacht and a Revenue Cutter off Ramsgate. Painting by Thomas Whitcombe of vessels of the period.

History

Great Britain
- Name: HMS Sherborne
- Ordered: 30 April 1763
- Builder: Woolwich Dockyard
- Laid down: 27 June 1763
- Launched: 3 December 1763
- Completed: By 16 March 1764
- Fate: Sold on 1 July 1784

General characteristics
- Class & type: 10-gun cutter
- Tons burthen: 8572/94 bm
- Length: 54 ft 7 in (16.6 m) (overall); 44 ft 8 in (13.6 m) (keel)
- Beam: 19 ft (5.8 m)
- Depth of hold: 8 ft 4 in (2.54 m)
- Propulsion: Sails
- Sail plan: Cutter
- Complement: 30
- Armament: 6 x 3-pounder guns + 8 swivel guns

HMS Sherborne (also HM cutter Sherborne, HMS Sherbourne) was a 10-gun cutter of the Royal Navy. She served in the English Channel for her entire career, operating against smugglers. She was sold in 1784.

== Design and construction ==
Sherborne was built at Woolwich Dockyard under the supervision of Master Shipwright Joseph Harris, to a design by Sir Thomas Slade, and was launched on 3 December 1763, having cost £1,581.8.9d to build and fit.

== Service ==
Sherborne was commissioned under Lieutenant John Cartwright, later to become a prominent parliamentary reformer, and was assigned to support the work of the Board of Customs by operating against smugglers in the English Channel. Cartwright commanded Sherborne from 7 December 1763 to 14 May 1766. His area of responsibility was the South Coast of England, including Dorsetshire and Devon. His brother George, when at loose ends, went with him in Sherborne on a cruise out of Plymouth to chase smugglers.

Lieutenant Christopher Raper succeeded Cartwright in 1766 as Sherborne's commander for the next three years. Between 1769 and 1777 the cutter was commanded successively by Lieutenants Stephen Rains, Thomas Rayment and Thomas Gaborian, all the while remaining based in the Channel. Her final commanders were Lieutenant Arthur Twyman, from September 1777 until May 1778, and then Lieutenant Arthur Hayne until September 1779. She was then laid up.

In 1783 Sherborne participated in William Tracey's unsuccessful attempt to raise HMS Royal George, which had sunk in Spithead in 1782. Although the dockyard rated Sherborne as unfitted for service, Tracey conducted some repairs and she was of some use.

== Fate ==
Sherborne was finally sold at Portsmouth on 1 July 1784.
