= HMS Zealous (1785) =

74-gun Royal Navy ship of the line

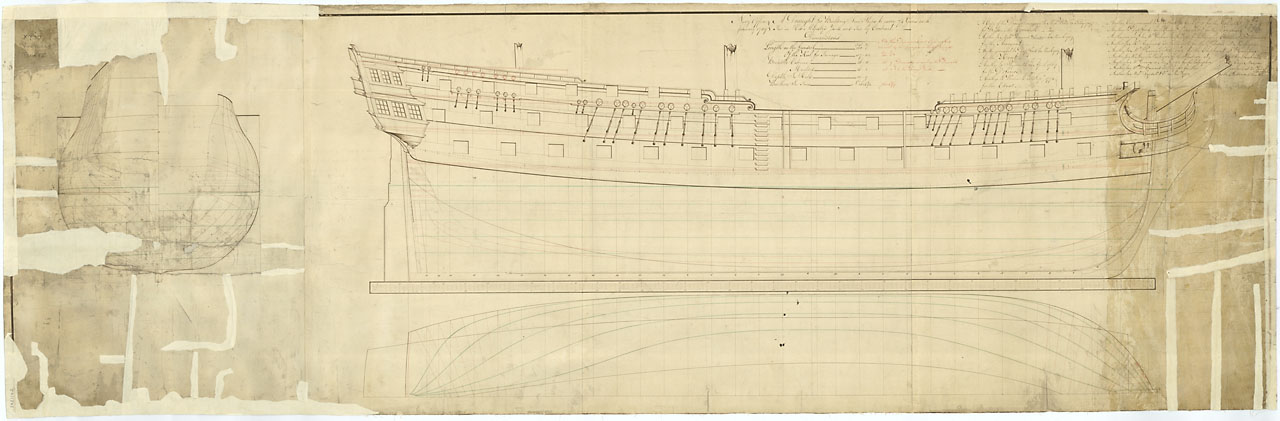
- Zealous

History

Great Britain
- Name: HMS Zealous
- Ordered: 19 June 1782
- Builder: Barnard, Deptford
- Laid down: December 1782
- Launched: 25 June 1785
- Fate: Broken up, December 1816
- Notes: Participated in: Battle of the Nile

General characteristics
- Class & type: Arrogant-class ship of the line
- Tons burthen: 1607 (bm)
- Length: 168 ft (51 m) (gundeck)
- Beam: 46 ft 9 in (14.25 m)
- Depth of hold: 19 ft 9 in (6.02 m)
- Propulsion: Sails
- Sail plan: Full-rigged ship
- Armament: Gundeck: 28 × 32-pounder guns; Upper gundeck: 28 × 18-pounder guns; Quarterdeck: 14 × 9-pounder guns; Forecastle: 4 × 9-pounder guns

HMS Zealous was a 74-gun third-rate ship of the line of the Royal Navy, built by Barnard of Deptford and launched on 25 June 1785.

She served in a number of battles of the French Revolutionary Wars and the Napoleonic Wars, notably the Battle of the Nile, where she engaged the French ship Guerrier, helping to force her surrender. She was later cruising off Cádiz in 1801. She missed out on the Battle of Trafalgar, having been dispatched to Gibraltar for resupply.

After Trafalgar, Zealous continued in the blockade of Cádiz. On 25 November 1805, Thunderer detained the Ragusan ship Nemesis, which was sailing from Isle de France to Leghorn, Italy, with a cargo of spice, indigo dye, and other goods. Zealous shared the prize money with ten other British warships.

Zealous was later assigned to convoy duty in the Mediterranean.

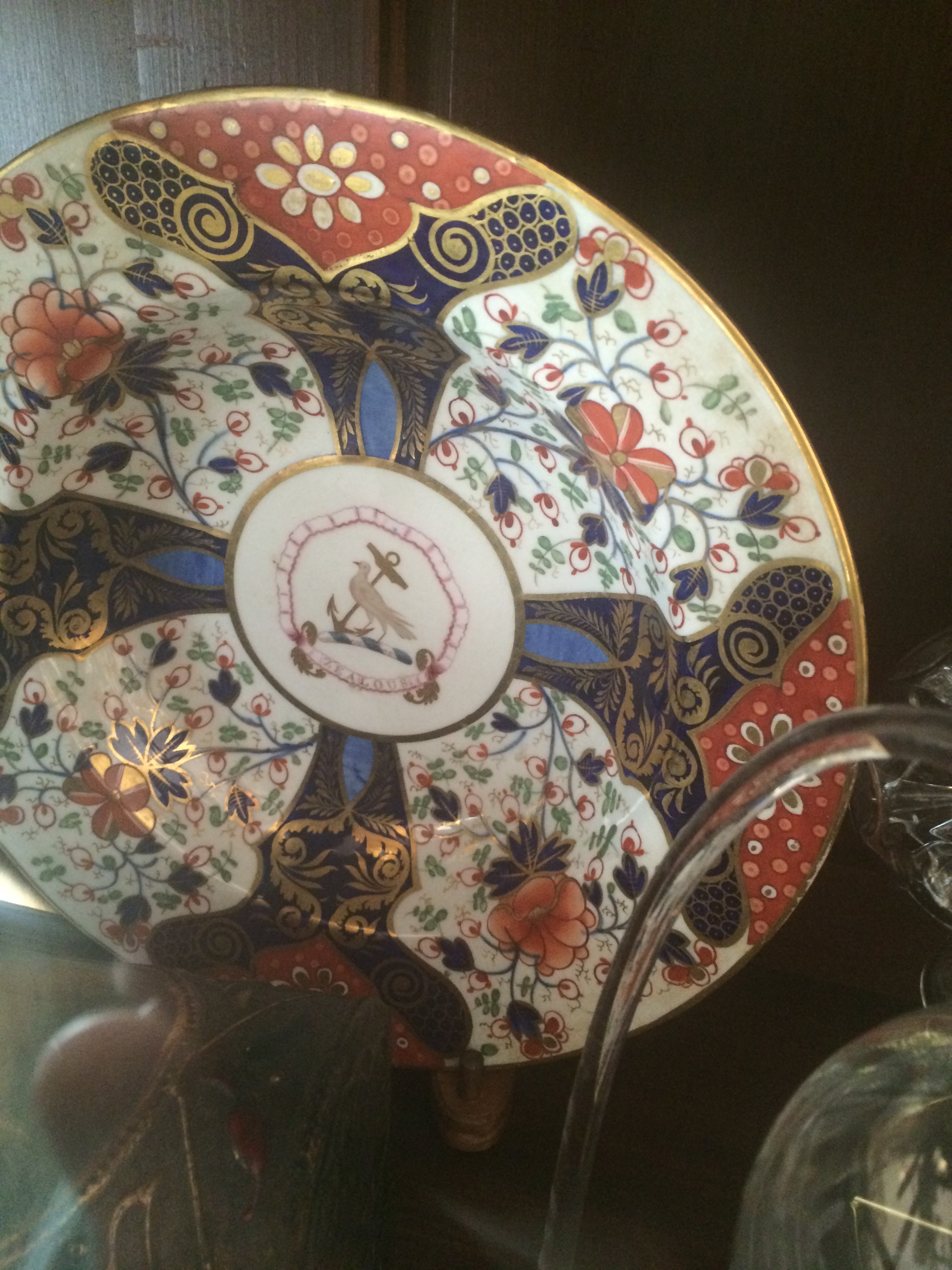
Formal dining china from HMS Zealous

== Fate ==
After 31 years of service, she was broken up in December 1816.
