= HMS Superb (1760) =

Ship of the line of the Royal Navy

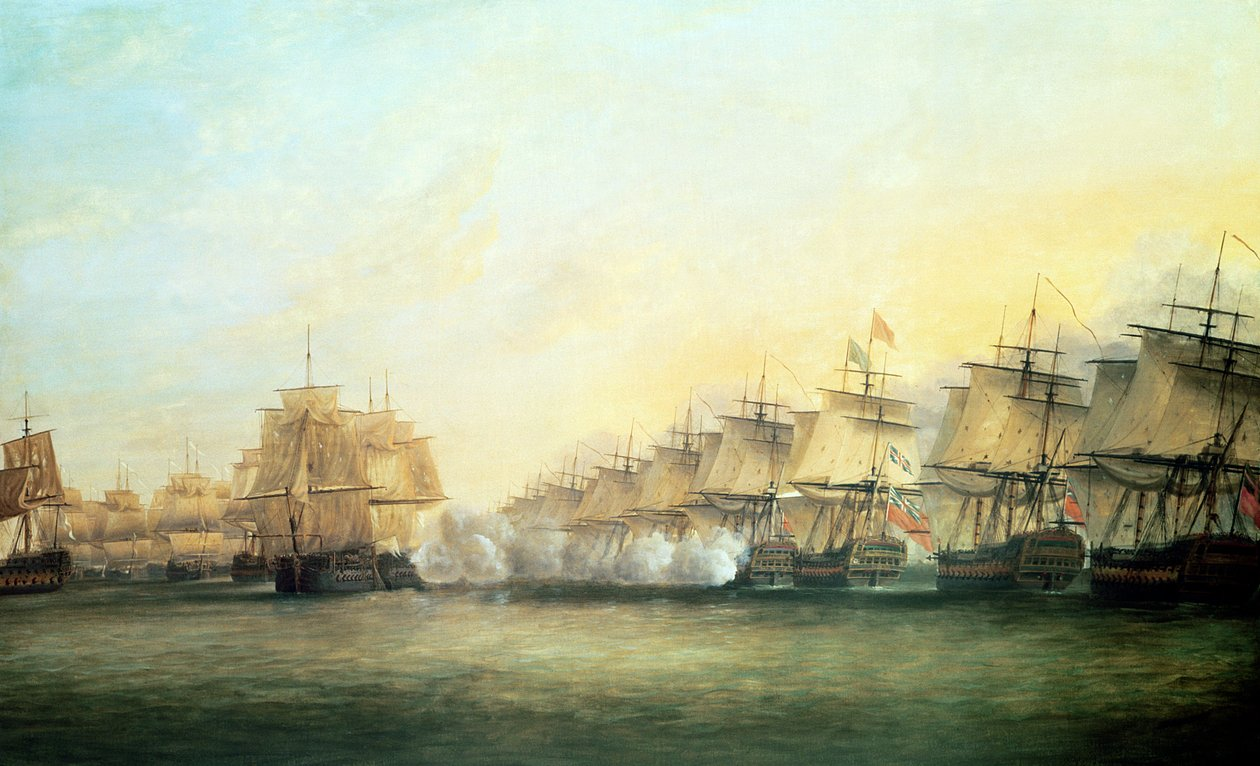
- The Battle of Trincomalee, which Superb fought in

History

Great Britain
- Name: HMS Superb
- Ordered: 28 December 1757
- Builder: Deptford Dockyard
- Laid down: 12 April 1758
- Launched: 27 October 1760
- Commissioned: November 1760
- Fate: Sank, 7 November 1783

General characteristics
- Class & type: Bellona-class ship of the line
- Tons burthen: 1,61214/94 (bm)
- Length: 168 ft (51 m) (gundeck); 137 ft 11.25 in (42.0434 m) (keel)
- Beam: 46 ft 10.5 in (14.288 m)
- Draught: 21 ft 6 in (6.55 m)
- Depth of hold: 19 ft 9 in (6.02 m)
- Sail plan: Full-rigged ship
- Armament: 74 guns: Lower gundeck: 28 × 32 pdrs; Upper gundeck: 28 × 18 pdrs; Quarterdeck: 14 × 9 pdrs; Forecastle: 4 × 9 pdrs

HMS Superb was a 74-gun Bellona-class third-rate ship of the line of the Royal Navy, designed by Sir Thomas Slade and built by Adam Hayes at Deptford Dockyard, launched on 27 October 1760 as a sister ship to HMS Dragon.

== Service history ==
In June 1762 during the Seven Years' War Superb and two other ships saved a convoy from a French squadron commanded by Commodore de Ternay.

In 1764 she carried troops to North America as part of the ongoing colonial conflict.

In January 1768 she hit a rock in Cork harbour off the coast of Ireland and had to return to Portsmouth for repair.

She sailed to the East Indies and in December 1780 she destroyed shipping at Mangalore. On 17 February 1782 she was part of the Battle of Sadras and on 12 April was in the Battle of Providien. On 6 July 1782 she was in the Second Battle of Negapatam and on the 3 September the Battle of Trincomalee.

The Superb was Admiral Edward Hughes's flagship in India in 1782 during a notable series of engagements with the French under Suffren.

On 20 June 1783 the Superb took part in the Battle of Cuddalore before returning to Bombay for copper sheathing along her hull. On 7 November she developed a severe leak through the sheathing into the bilge, and sank in Tellicherry Roads off the Bombay coast, with the loss of her commander, Captain Dunbar Maclellan and her crew of 550 men.
