= HMS Magnificent (1766) =

Ship of the line of the Royal Navy

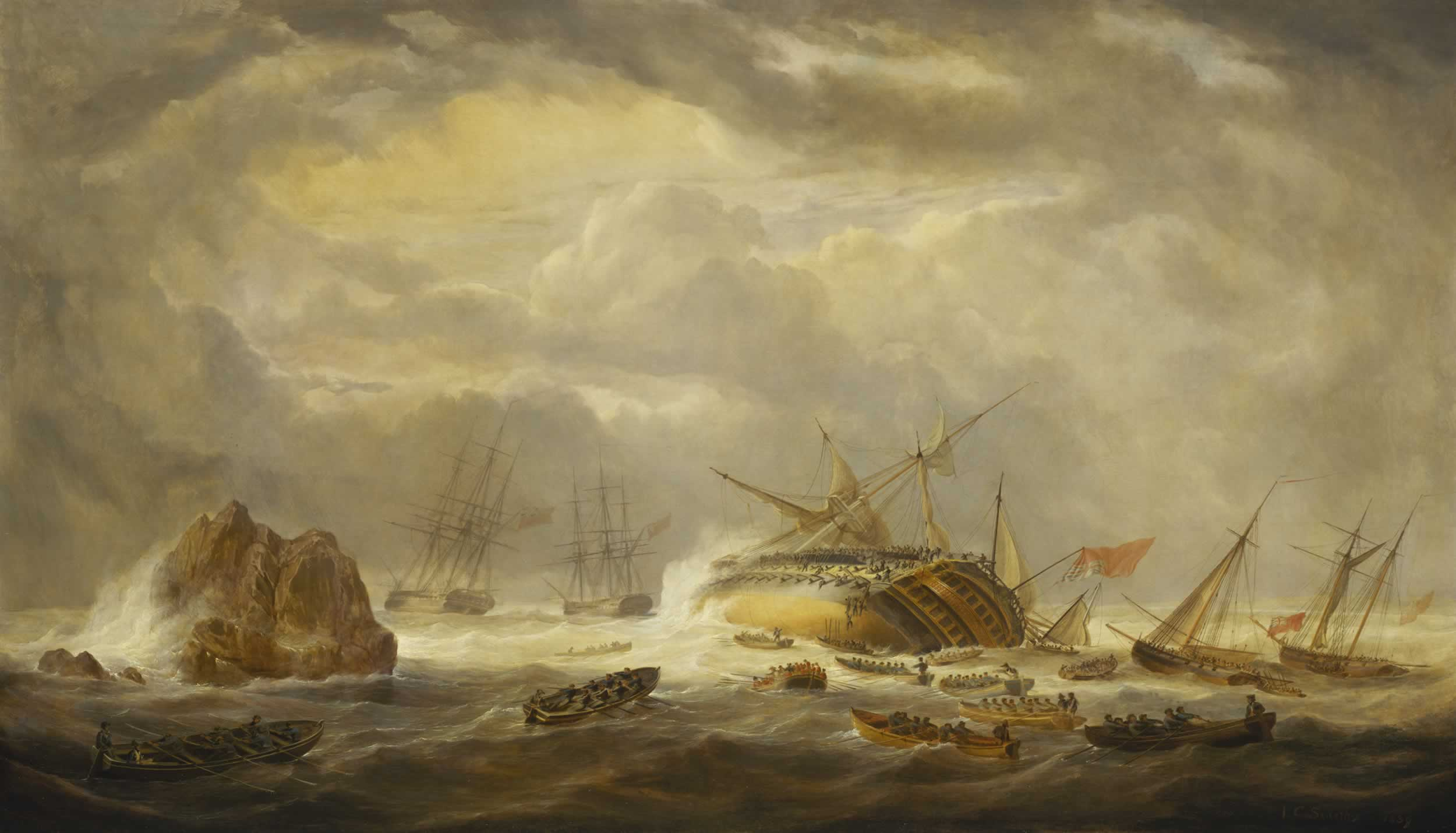
- Loss of the Magnificent by John Christian Schetky

History

Great Britain
- Name: HMS Magnificent
- Ordered: 16 December 1761
- Builder: Deptford Dockyard
- Laid down: 15 April 1762
- Launched: 20 September 1766
- Commissioned: July 1778
- Fate: Wrecked off Brest, 25 March 1804
- Notes: Participated in: Battle of Grenada; Battle of Martinique; Battle of the Saintes

General characteristics
- Class & type: Ramillies-class ship of the line
- Tons burthen: 161264/94 (bm)
- Length: 168 ft 6 in (51.36 m) (gundeck)
- Beam: 46 ft 9 in (14.25 m)
- Depth of hold: 19 ft 9 in (6.02 m)
- Propulsion: Sails
- Sail plan: Full-rigged ship
- Armament: Gundeck: 28 × 32-pounder guns; Upper gundeck: 28 × 18-pounder guns; QD: 14 × 9-pounder guns; Fc: 4 × 9-pounder guns

HMS Magnificent was a 74-gun third-rate ship of the line of the Royal Navy, built by Adam Hayes launched on 20 September 1766 at Deptford Dockyard. She was one of the Ramillies-class built to update the Navy and replace ships lost following the Seven Years' War. She served through two wars before her loss during blockade duty off the French coast.

On 21 December 1779, HMS Magnificent with the 74-gun ships HMS Suffolk and HMS Vengeance, and the 64-gun HMS Stirling Castle under Rear-Admiral Joshua Rowley, fell in with the 32-gun French frigates Fortunee and Blanche and the 28-gun Elise, when off Guadeloupe. The French ships were in bad order; their crews were excessively weak; and thus they could not escape the vastly superior British force. The Blanche was overtaken and captured on the evening of the 21st; the Fortunes, by throwing her quarterdeck guns overboard, kept away a little longer, but was captured at last in the early morning of 22 December, an hour before the Elise.

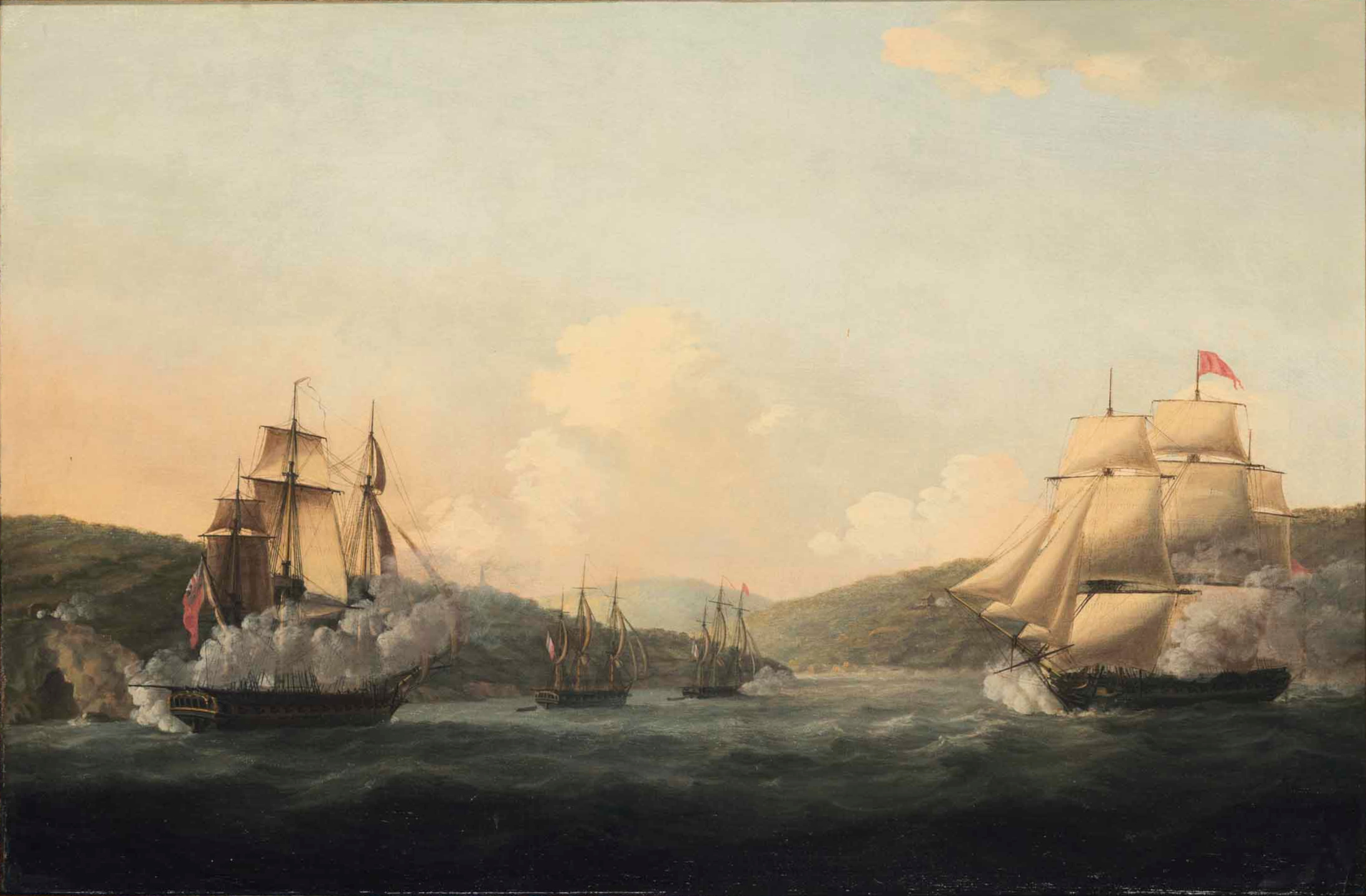
The capture of the 32-gun French frigate Amiable and the corvette Ceres after their encounter with Sir Samuel Hood in the Barfleur, with the Valiant and the Magnificent, in the Mona Passage, 19 April 1782

Her war service in the American War of Independence was conducted with Rodney's fleet in the Caribbean, where she served in the battles off Grenada in 1779, Martinique in 1780 and the Saintes in 1782. Her duties during the Napoleonic Wars mainly consisted of blockade duties off the French coast, but between 1798 and 1800, the ship had received a complete overhaul designed to extend her service life and improve her ability at performing the close blockade.

Magnificent came under the command of Captain John Giffard on 23 February 1801 upon his transfer from HMS Active. On 9 April 1802, the 8th West India Regiment revolted in Dominica. They killed three officers, imprisoned the others and took over Fort Shirley. On the following day, HMS Magnificent, which was anchored in Prince Rupert's Bay under Captain John Giffard's command sent a party of marines ashore to restore order. The mutineers fired upon the Magnificent with no effect. On 12 April, Governor Cochrane entered Fort Shirley with the Royal Scots Regiment and the 68th Regiment of Foot. The rebels were drawn up on the Upper Battery of Fort Shirley with three of their officers as prisoners and presented arms to the other troops. They obeyed Cochrane's command to ground their arms but refused his order to step forward. The mutineers picked up their arms and fired a volley. Shots were returned, followed by a bayonet charge that broke their ranks and a close range fire fight ensued. Those mutineers who tried to escape over the precipice to the sea were exposed to grape-shot and canister fire from Magnificent. The 74-gun Excellent, the frigate Severn, and the sloop Gaiete assisted Magnificent, also supplying marines.

On the morning of 25 March 1804, during her duties blockading the French port of Brest, she struck an uncharted reef close to the Black Rocks that bordered the port and rapidly began to founder. The remaining ships of the blockading squadron closed in and removed most of the crew, the remainder of whom took to boats as the ship sank at 10.30am, just an hour and a half after she struck the reef. Although all her crew survived, a boat carrying 86 men became diverted from the main group and was washed ashore on the French coast, where the men remained in captivity for ten years. The captain, William Jervis, was later reported to have lost £1500 in lost property on board the wreck.
