= HMS St Albans (1747) =

Ship of the line of the Royal Navy

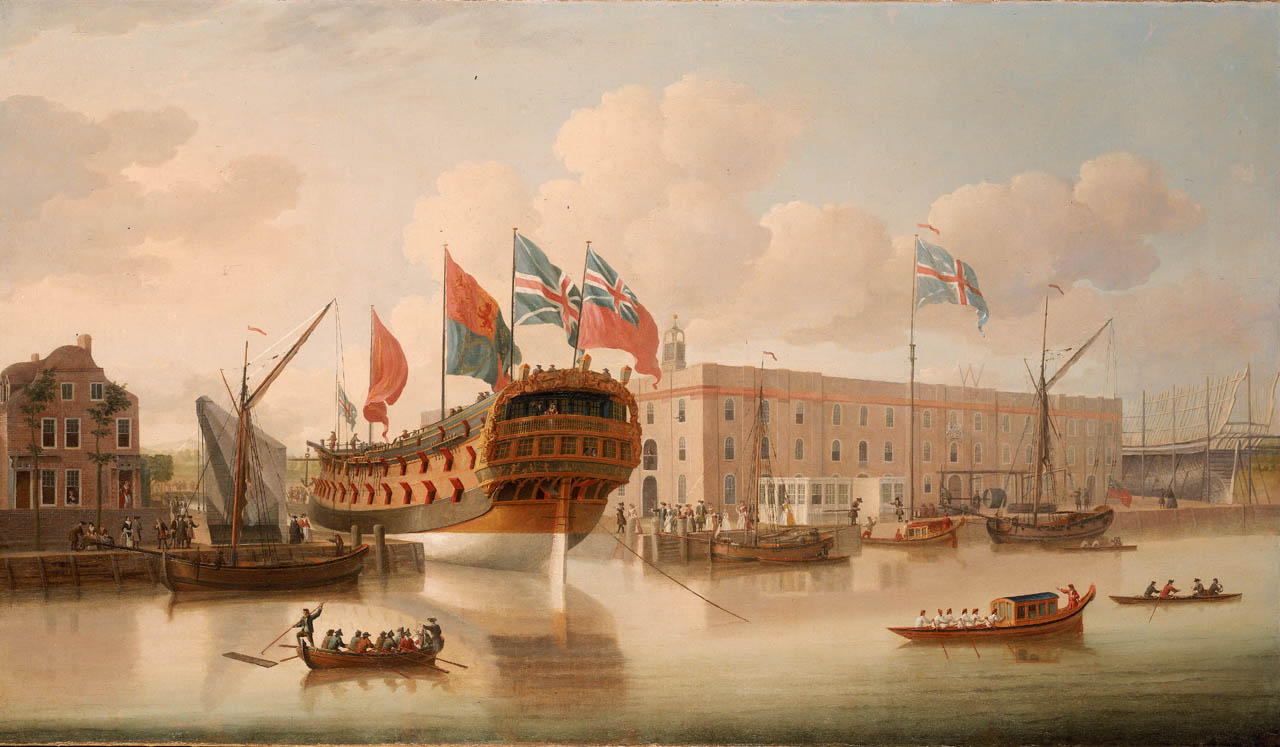
- 'St Albans' Floated out at Deptford, 1747 by John Cleveley the Elder

History

Great Britain
- Name: HMS St Albans
- Ordered: 6 August 1745
- Builder: Thomas West, Deptford Dockyard
- Laid down: September 1745
- Launched: 23 December 1747
- Commissioned: December 1747
- In service: 1747-1754; 1755-1760
- Fate: Sold at Chatham Dockyard, 1765

General characteristics
- Class & type: 1745 Establishment 60-gun fourth rate ship of the line
- Tons burthen: 1,207 32/94 (bm)
- Length: 149 ft 10 in (45.7 m) (gundeck); 121 ft 4 in (37.0 m) (keel)
- Beam: 43 ft 3 in (13.2 m)
- Depth of hold: 18 ft 6 in (5.6 m)
- Sail plan: Full-rigged ship
- Complement: 420
- Armament: 60 guns: Gundeck: 24 × 24 pdrs; Upper deck: 26 × 18 pdrs; Quarterdeck: 8 × 6 pdrs; Forecastle: 2 × 6 pdrs

HMS St Albans was a 60-gun fourth rate ship of the line of the Royal Navy, built at Deptford Dockyard to the draught specified by the 1745 Establishment, and launched on 23 December 1747. She saw service against France in the Seven Years' War. On July 1758 she was off the coast of Toulon when she captured a French merchant vessel, the 36-gun Loire carrying a thousand tons of food, wine and flour for France's colony in Quebec. The captured ship and her 300-man crew were conveyed under guard to the British port of Gibraltar.

St Albans served until 1765, when she was sold out of the Navy.
