= Arrogant-class ship of the line =

1761 class of British third-rate ships of the line

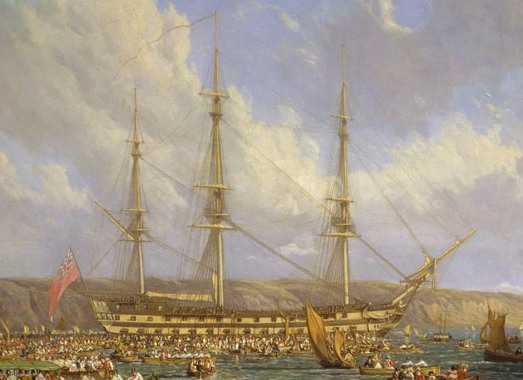
- Scene in Plymouth Sound in August 1815, oil on canvas: HMS Bellerophon anchored in Plymouth Sound, with Napoleon Bonaparte aboard.

Class overview
- Name: Arrogant
- Operators: Royal Navy
- Preceded by: Bellona class
- Succeeded by: Canada class
- In service: 22 January 1761 – 1868
- Completed: 12
- Lost: 2 (burnt or scuttled as unserviceable)

General characteristics
- Type: Ship of the line
- Tons burthen: 1,614 3/94 (bm)
- Length: 168 ft (51.2 m) (gundeck)
- Beam: 46 ft 9 in (14.2 m)
- Depth of hold: 19 ft 9 in (6.0 m)
- Propulsion: Sails
- Sail plan: Full-rigged ship
- Complement: 550 or 600
- Armament: 74 muzzle-loading, smoothbore guns: Lower gundeck: 28 × 32 pdr guns; Upper gundeck: 28 × 18 pdr guns; Forecastle: 4 × 9 pdr guns; Quarter deck: 14 × 9 pdr guns

The Arrogant-class ships of the line were a class of twelve 74-gun third-rate ships that served in the Royal Navy. The ships were built in two batches; the first pair during the 1760s and the others during the 1780s.

== Design and description ==
The Arrogant-class ships were designed as a development of the co-Surveyor of the Navy, Sir Thomas Slade's previous Bellona class, sharing the same basic dimensions. It was one of the "common" type of 74 with lighter guns than those of the "large" classes. Two ships were ordered on 13 December 1758 to this design (at the same time as the fourth and fifth units of the Bellona class), and a further ten ships were built to a slightly modified version of the design from 1773 onwards.

The design measured 168 feet (51.2 m) on the gundeck and 138 feet 10 inches (42.3 m) on the keel. It had a beam of 46 feet 9 inches (14.2 m), a depth of hold of 19 feet 9 inches (6.0 m) and had a tonnage of 1,614 3/94 tons burthen. The ships' crew numbered 550, for the first batch, or 600, for the second batch, officers and ratings. They were fitted with three masts and were ship-rigged.

The ships were armed with 74 muzzle-loading, smoothbore guns that consisted of twenty-eight 32-pounder guns on their lower gundeck and twenty-eight 18-pounder guns on their upper deck. Their forecastle mounted four 9-pounder guns. On their quarterdeck they carried fourteen 9-pounder guns.

== Ships ==
Ship name	Builder	Ordered	Laid down	Launched	Completed	Fate
HMS Arrogant	John Barnard, Harwich	13 December 1758	March 1759	22 January 1761	28 April 1761	Sold at Bombay to be broken up, 1810
HMS Cornwall	William Wells, Deptford	13 December 1758	19 February 1759	19 May 1761	16 September 1761	Burnt or scuttled as unserviceable at St Lucia, 30 June 1780
HMS Edgar	Woolwich Dockyard	25 August 1774	-Nul	30 June 1779		Broken up, 1835
HMS Goliath	Deptford Dockyard	21 February 1778		19 October 1781		Broken up, 1815
HMS Zealous	Barnard, Deptford	19 June 1782		25 June 1785		Broken up, 1816
HMS Audacious	Randall, Rotherhithe			23 July 1785		Broken up, 1815
HMS Elephant	Parsons, Bursledon	27 December 1781		24 August 1786		Broken up, 1830
HMS Bellerophon	Graves, Frindsbury	11 January 1782		6 October 1786		Sold out of the service, 1836
HMS Saturn	Raymond, Northam	22 December 1781		22 November 1786		Broken up, 1868
HMS Vanguard	Deptford Dockyard	9 December 1779		6 March 1787		Broken up, 1821
HMS Excellent	Graham, Harwich	9 August 1781		27 November 1787		Broken up, 1835
HMS Illustrious	Henry Adams, Bucklers Hard	31 December 1781		7 July 1789		Grounded in gale near Livorno (Leghorn) and burnt, 28 March 1795
