= HMS Marlborough (1767) =

Ship of the line of the Royal Navy

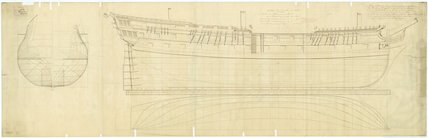
- Marlborough

History

Great Britain
- Name: HMS Marlborough
- Ordered: 4 December 1760
- Builder: Deptford dockyard
- Laid down: 3 June 1763
- Launched: 26 August 1767
- Commissioned: January 1771
- Fate: Wrecked 3 November 1800
- Notes: Participated in: Battle of Cape St Vincent; Battle of the Saintes; Glorious First of June

General characteristics
- Class & type: Ramillies-class ship of the line
- Tons burthen: 1642 bm
- Length: 168 ft 8.5 in (51.422 m) (gun deck)
- Beam: 46 ft 11 in (14.30 m)
- Depth of hold: 19 ft 9 in (6.02 m)
- Propulsion: Sails
- Sail plan: Full-rigged ship
- Complement: 600
- Armament: 74 guns: Gundeck: 28 × 32 pdrs; Upper gundeck: 28 × 18 pdrs; Quarterdeck: 14 × 9 pdrs; Forecastle: 4 × 9 pdrs

HMS Marlborough was a 74-gun third-rate ship of the line of the Royal Navy, launched on 26 August 1767 at Deptford and built by the master shipwright Adam Hayes, at a cost of £33,319.

She was one of the Ramillies class built to update the Navy and replace ships lost following the Seven Years' War. She was first commissioned in 1771 under Captain Richard Bickerton as a guard ship for the Medway and saw active service in the American Revolutionary War and on the Glorious First of June (1794).

On 12 April 1782, under the command of Captain Taylor Penny, Marlborough headed the attack on the French fleet during the Battle of the Saintes. During this action three men were killed and 16 wounded. It then sailed to North America attached to Admiral Hugh Pigot's fleet.

At the battle of the First of June Marlborough, under Captain George Cranfield Berkeley, suffered heavy damage after becoming entangled with Impétueux, and then with Mucius. The three entangled ships continued exchanging fire for some time, all suffering heavy casualties with Marlborough losing all three of her masts.

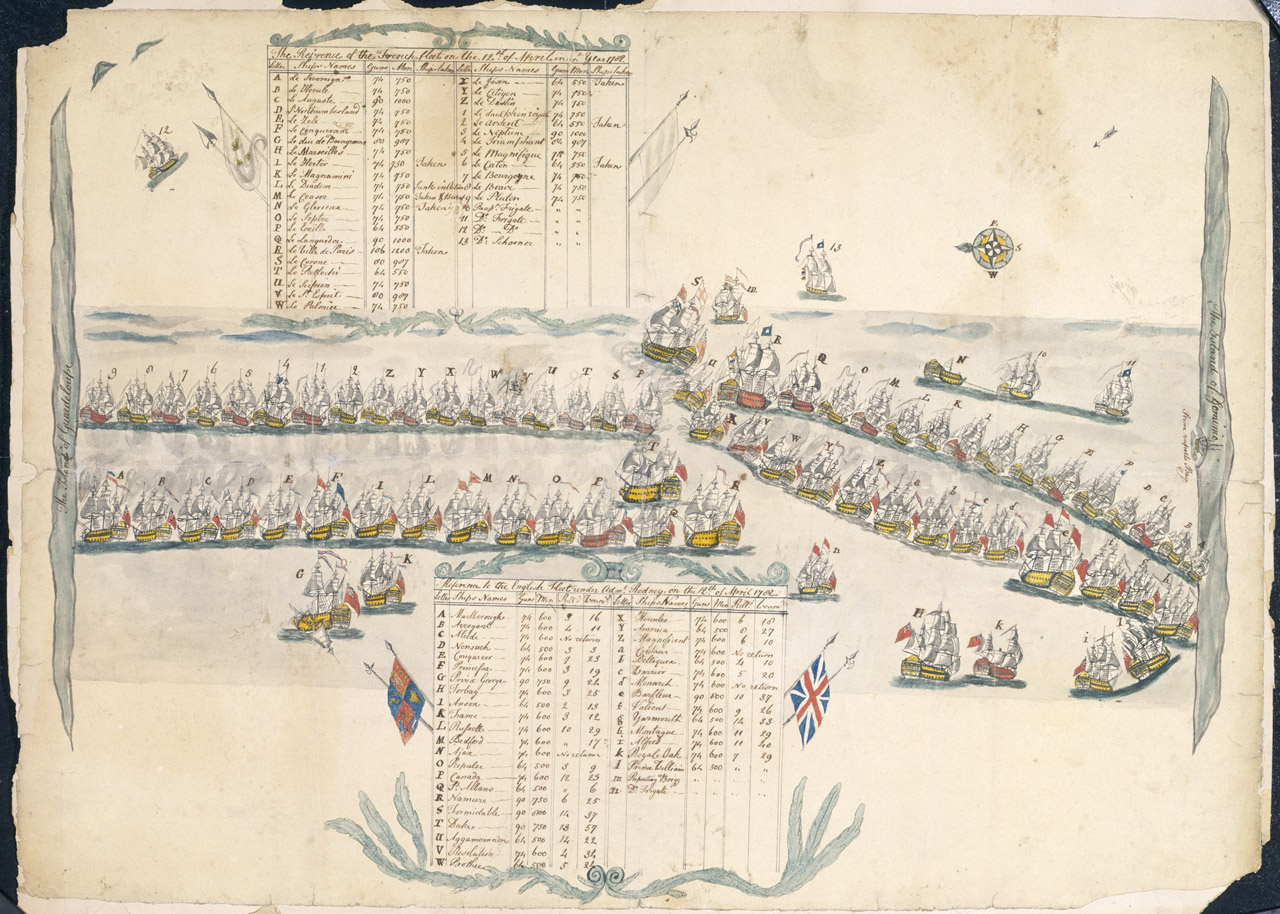
This map shows Marlborough's position between Guadaloupe and Dominica, during the Battle of the Saintes, 12 Apr 1782

In May 1797 a mutiny ejected the commander, Captain Henry Nicholls. He was replaced by Captain John Eaton then Joseph Ellison in August 1797. In May 1798 a second mutiny occurred in Berehaven.

On the evening of 3 November 1800 Marlborough was at sea in a storm off Brittany's Belle Île when strong winds drove her onto a partially submerged ledge of rocks. A substantial breach was opened in her hull and she began to batter against the rocks with each incoming wave. Her commander, Captain Thomas Sotheby, ordered the ship's guns and stores to be thrown overboard to lighten her, but she remained stuck fast.

The storm abated by the following morning, but the ship had settled on the rocks and was awash to her orlop deck as waves flowed in through the hull. A distress signal was raised and answered by HMS Captain which drew close to Marlborough and succeeded in taking off all 600 of her crew. No attempt was made to salvage the ship itself.
