= Bellona-class ship of the line =

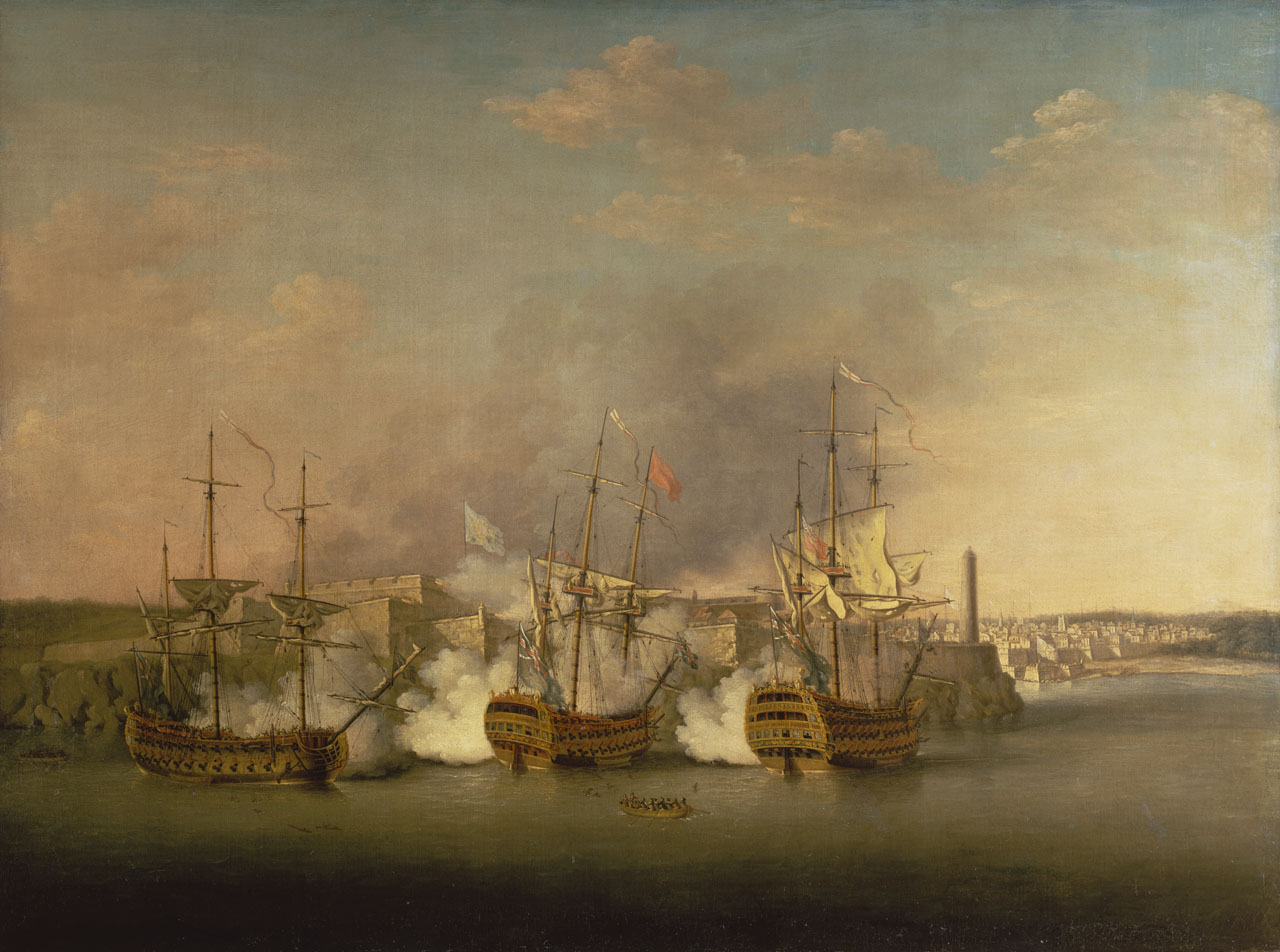
- The bombardment of Morro Castle on Havana - HMS Dragon, centre

Class overview
- Name: Bellona
- Operators: Royal Navy
- Preceded by: Valiant class
- Succeeded by: Arrogant class
- In service: 19 February 1760 – 1814
- Completed: 5
- Lost: 2

General characteristics
- Type: Ship of the line
- Length: 168 ft (51 m) (gundeck); 138 ft (42 m) (keel)
- Beam: 46 ft 9 in (14.25 m)
- Propulsion: Sails
- Armament: 74 guns: Gundeck: 28 × 32-pounders; Upper gundeck: 28 × 18-pounders; Quarterdeck: 14 × 9-pounders; Forecastle: 4 × 9-pounders
- Notes: Ships in class include: Bellona, Dragon, Superb, Kent, Defence

The Bellona-class ships of the line were a class of five 74-gun third rates, whose design for the Royal Navy by Sir Thomas Slade was approved on 31 January 1758. Three ships were ordered on 28 December 1757, with names being assigned on 1 February 1758. Two further ships to this design were ordered on 13 December 1758, at the same time as two ships of a revised design – the Arrogant class.

== Design ==
Slade's Bellona class was the first class of British 74s to have a gun deck length of 168 ft (51 m), and marked the beginning of a stabilisation of the design of this size of ship. Several subsequent classes designed by Slade were almost identical to the Bellona draught, with the main differences restricted to the underwater hull – the most numerous of these being the Arrogant and Elizabeth classes.

== Ships ==
- HMS Bellona

Builder: Chatham Dockyard
Ordered: 28 December 1757.
Laid down: 10 May 1758.
Launched: 19 February 1760.
Completed: 6 April 1760.
Fate: Broken up at Chatham, September 1814.

- HMS Dragon

Builder: Deptford Dockyard
Ordered: 28 December 1757.
Laid down: 28 March 1758.
Launched: 4 March 1760.
Completed: 19 April 1760.
Fate: Sold to be broken up, June 1784.

- HMS Superb

Builder: Deptford Dockyard
Ordered: 28 December 1757.
Laid down: 12 April 1758.
Launched: 27 October 1760.
Completed: 19 December 1760.
Fate: Wrecked at Bombay, 7 November 1783.

- HMS Kent

Builder: Deptford Dockyard
Ordered: 13 December 1758.
Laid down: 24 April 1759.
Launched: 26 March 1762.
Completed: 8 July 1762.
Fate: Sold to be broken up, August 1784.

- HMS Defence

Builder: Plymouth Dockyard
Ordered: 13 December 1758.
Laid down: 14 May 1759.
Launched: 31 March 1763.
Completed: 19 October 1770.
Fate: Wrecked off Jutland, 24 December 1811.
