= HMS Dragon (1760) =

British Royal Navy ship launched in 1760

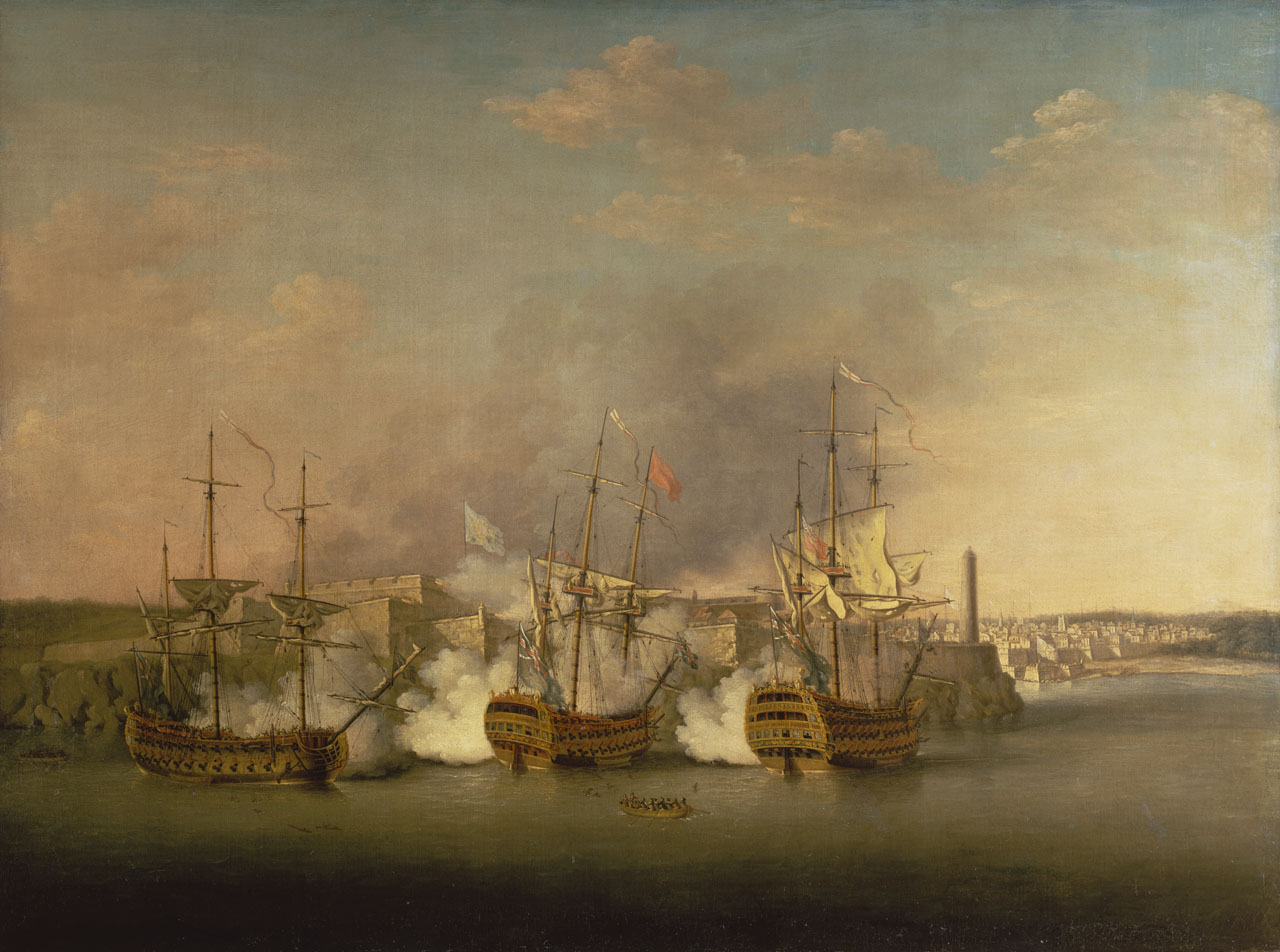
- The bombardment of Morro Castle on Havana - HMS Dragon, centre

History

Great Britain
- Name: HMS Dragon
- Ordered: 28 December 1757
- Builder: Deptford Dockyard to a design by Sir Thomas Slade
- Laid down: 28 March 1758
- Launched: 4 March 1760
- Commissioned: March 1760
- Fate: Sold out of the service, 1784
- Notes: Harbour service from 1781

General characteristics
- Class & type: Bellona-class ship of the line
- Tons burthen: 1,61473/94 (bm)
- Length: 168 ft (51 m) (gundeck); 137 ft 11 in (42.04 m) (keel)
- Beam: 46 ft 11 in (14.30 m)
- Draught: 21 ft 6 in (6.55 m)
- Depth of hold: 19 ft 9 in (6.02 m)
- Sail plan: Full-rigged ship
- Armament: 74 guns: Lower gundeck: 28 × 32 pdrs; Upper gundeck: 28 × 18 pdrs; Quarterdeck: 14 × 9 pdrs; Forecastle: 4 × 9 pdrs

HMS Dragon was a 74-gun Bellona-class third-rate ship of the line of the Royal Navy, launched on 4 March 1760 at Deptford Dockyard.

== Service history ==
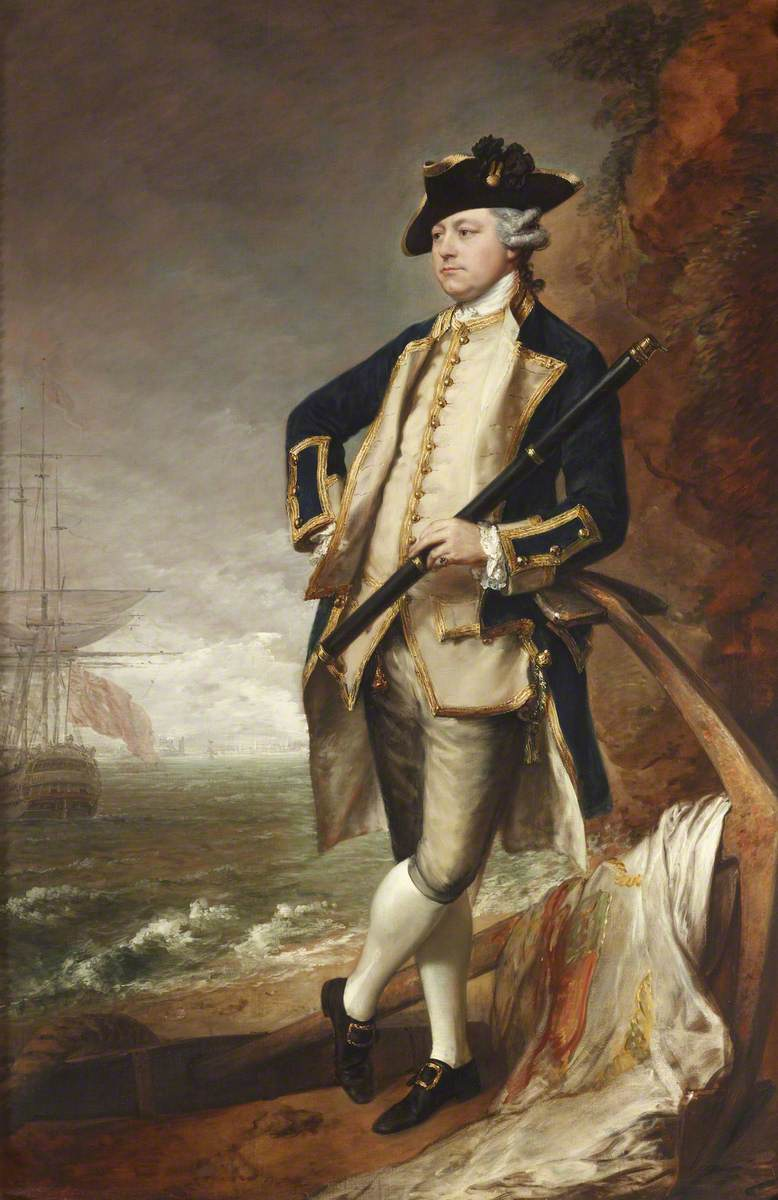
Portrait of Augustus Hervey by Thomas Gainsborough, 1767. The Dragon is shown behind him, commemorating her role in the taking of Havana.

She was commissioned in 1760, under the command of the Hon. Augustus Hervey, as part of the Western Squadron. In October 1761 she sailed for the Leeward Islands, and until March 1763 was engaged in naval operations in the Caribbean, including the Siege of Havana in 1762. as part of the Seven Years' War.

Francis Light, founder of Penang, served on HMS Dragon in 1760.

In March 1763 she was paid off, and recommissioned as a guardship at Portsmouth in May 1763, where she served until once again paid off in 1770. From 1781 she was employed as a receiving ship at Portsmouth, before being finally paid off in April 1783 and sold in Portsmouth in June 1784 for £620.

== Commanders of Note ==
- Captain John Bentinck 1766 to 1769

== Notes ==
This article includes data donated from the National Maritime Museum Warship Histories project
