= Thomas Slade =

English shipwright (1703/4–1771)

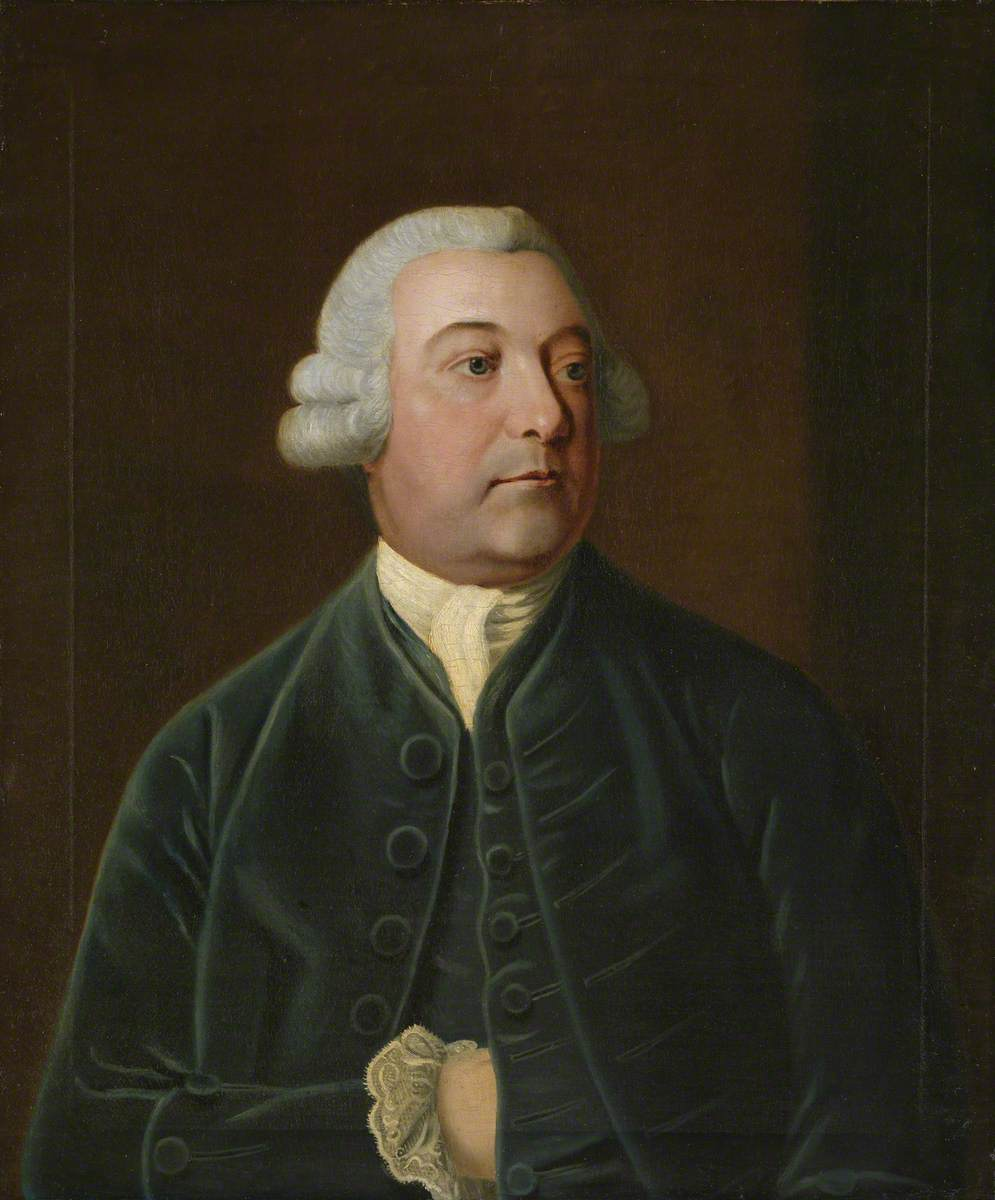
Portrait of Slade

Sir Thomas Slade (1703/4 – 23 February 1771) was an English shipwright best known for designing the ship of the line HMS Victory, which served as Horatio Nelson's flagship at the Battle of Trafalgar in 1805.

== Early life ==
He was the son of Arthur Slade (1682–1746) and his wife Hannah Moore. His paternal uncle was Benjamin Slade, Master Shipwright at Deptford Dockyard.

== Career outline ==
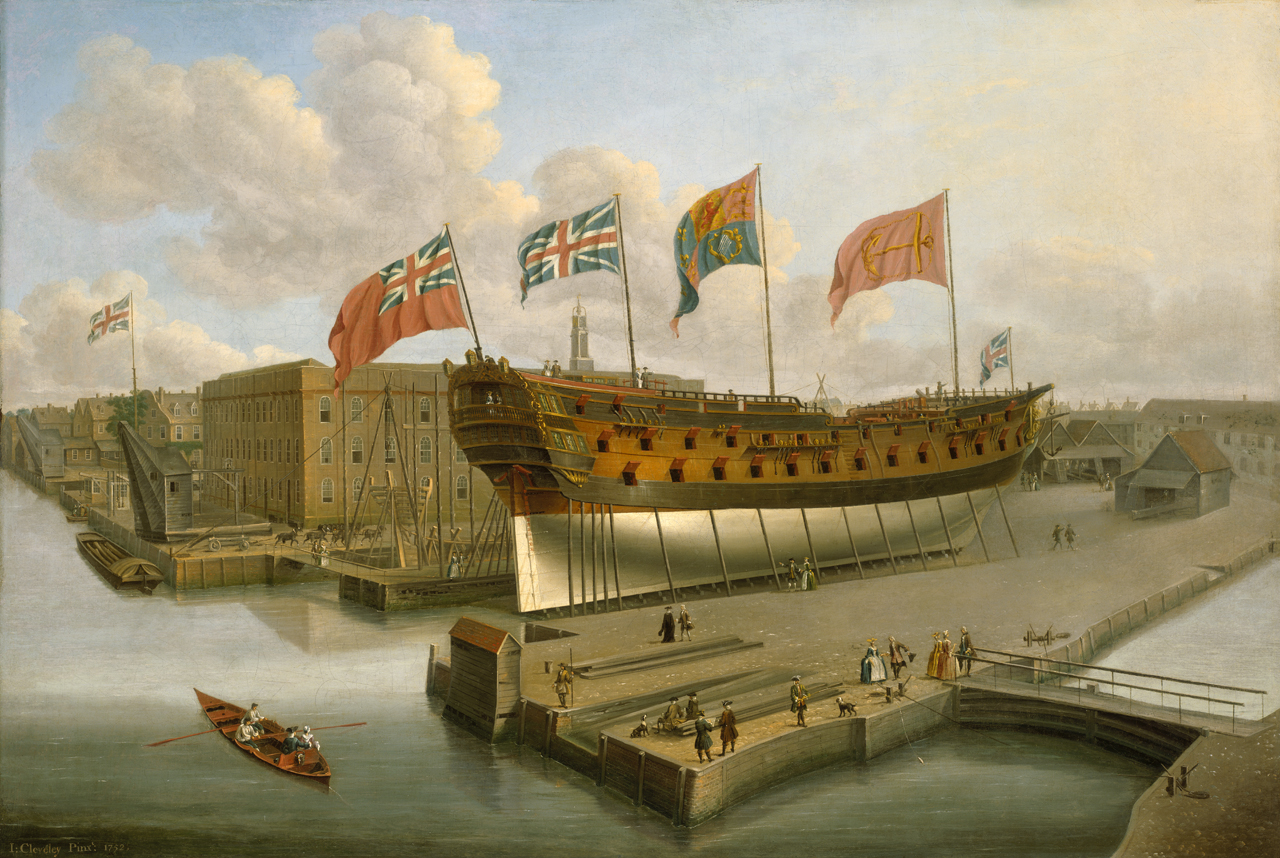
c. 1752 painting of Woolwich Dockyard, where Slade served as master shipwright from 1752 to 1755

Like many who rose to the pinnacle of the design of British sailing warships, Thomas Slade began as a shipwright in the Royal Dockyards. His uncle Benjamin Slade was Master Shipwright at Plymouth Dockyard (a master shipwright was responsible for all ship construction and repair at the dockyard in which he served). In 1744 Thomas became Deputy Master Shipwright at Woolwich Dockyard. On 22 November 1750 he replaced his uncle, who had died that year, as Master Shipwright at Plymouth. On 27 May 1752 he was transferred temporarily back to Woolwich Dockyard as Master Shipwright, and from there to Chatham Dockyard on 17 June 1752 and subsequently on 15 March 1753 to Deptford Dockyard, where he remained until 5 August 1755.

He was appointed Surveyor of the Navy in August 1755 by George Anson, First Lord of the Admiralty, serving until his death in February 1771. For the first decade, he shared the appointment with William Bately, formerly the Deputy Surveyor of the Navy, until the latter's retirement in June 1765. On Bately's retirement, John Williams was appointed to share the post. Nevertheless, Slade was clearly the senior surveyor throughout his tenure. He was knighted on 27 January 1768.

== Achievements ==
According to N. A. M. Rodger:

The ships which [he] designed...were admirably suited to Britain's strategic requirements...By common consent, Slade was the greatest British naval architect of the century...it was generally agreed (even by themselves) that his successors, though competent designers, never matched his genius.

During this tenure, Slade was responsible for several major design changes. He produced a 'generic design' that was used as a template for the Royal Navy's 74-gun ships and frigates. His '74' designs, starting with the Dublin-class, were an evolution of current British ships, built to compete with the new French '74's, some of which had been captured during the War of Austrian Succession in 1747. At least forty-six '74's were built to his designs; the last was launched in 1789.

He also designed HMS Asia, which was the first true 64-gun ship. As a result, the Royal Navy ordered no further 60-gun ships but instead commissioned more 64s. Because these incorporated alterations learned from trials with Asia, subsequent ships were bigger, she was the only ship of her draught (class). The first of these was HMS Ardent, which ushered in the Ardent-class. Slade also designed smaller vessels, such as the 10-gun Board of Customs cutter, HMS Sherborne.

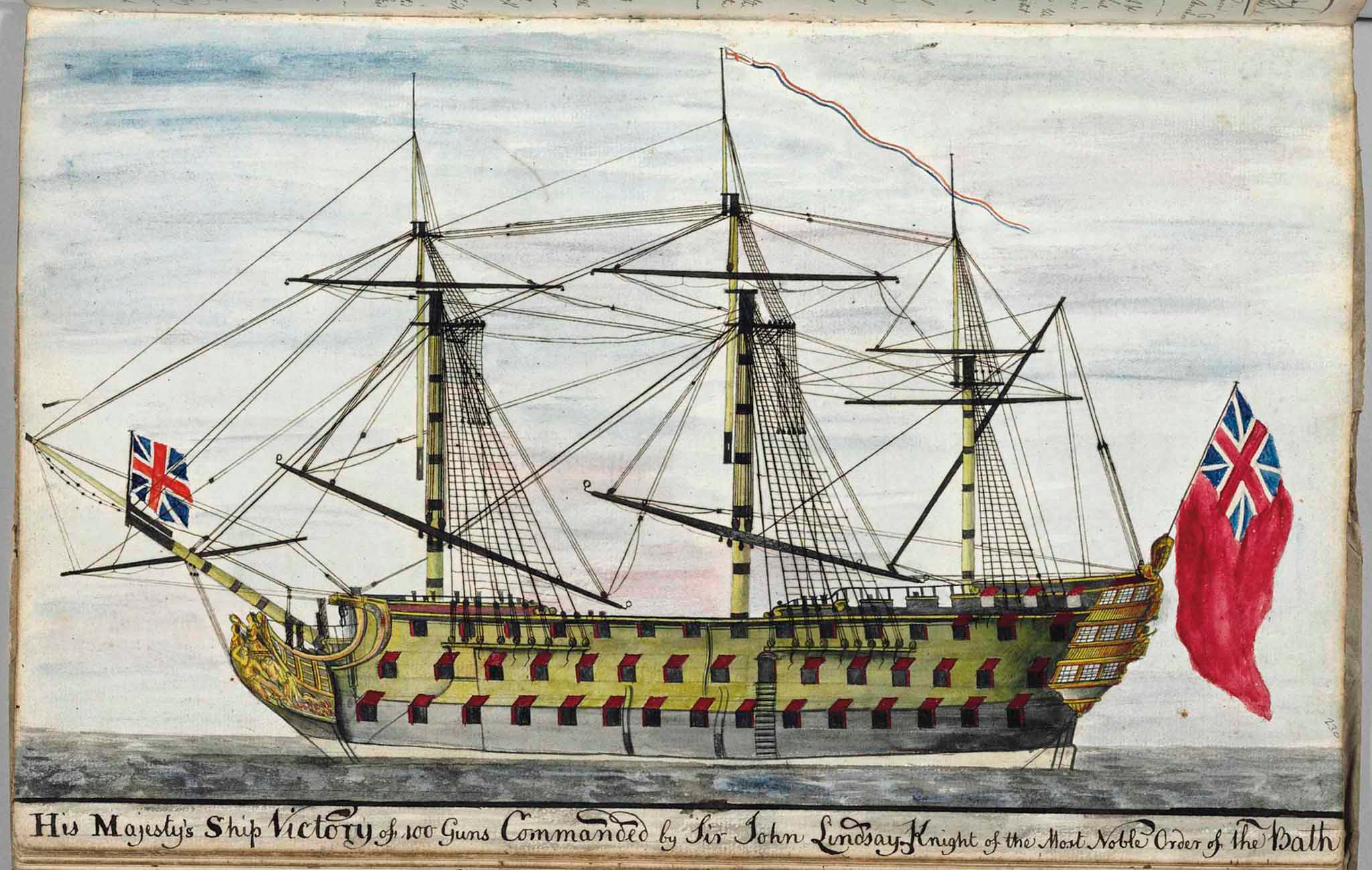
1778 illustration of HMS Victory, the most famous ship Slade designed

Victory was his most famous single vessel. Once commissioned, she became the most successful first-rate ship of the line ever built. On 13 December 1758, the Board of Admiralty in London placed an order for the construction of 12 new ships of the line, including one of 100 guns. The following year the Admiralty chose the name Victory for this vessel, despite the previous holders of the name having been largely unsuccessful. In 1758, Nelson was born, who would die on her decks at Trafalgar.

Out of the 33 ships which were available to Nelson at Trafalgar, eight (Africa, Victory, Agamemnon, Bellerophon, Defiance, Thunderer, Defence, and Prince) were built to Thomas Slade's designs. Two more of his ships (Swiftsure and Berwick) had been captured by the French earlier and fought on the French side. Slade's designs represented 24% of Nelson's ships and 29% of his guns.

=== Designs ===
This table lists ships that were built to designs drawn up by Thomas Slade. Some of them were not ordered until after his death.

| Name | Type | Guns | Built | Laid down | Commissioned | Shipyard | Notes |
|---|---|---|---|---|---|---|---|
| HMS Victory | First rate | 104 | 1 | 1759 | 1778 | Chatham Dockyard | Nelson's flagship at the Battle of Trafalgar. |
| Sandwich class | Second rate | 90 | 3 | | 1759–1761 | Chatham Dockyard, Woolwich Dockyard | |
| London class | Second rate | 90–98 | 4 | | 1766–1790 | Chatham Dockyard, Woolwich Dockyard, Deptford Dockyard | |
| Barfleur class | Second rate | 90 | 4 | | 1768–1777 | Chatham Dockyard, Portsmouth Dockyard | |
| Dublin class | Third rate | 74 | 7 | 1755–1756 | 1757–1759 | Deptford Dockyard; Wells & Company, Deptford; Chatham Dockyard; Woolwich Dockyard; Thomas West, Deptford; Henry Bird, Northam, Southampton; Portsmouth Dockyard | First class of 74-gun ships built for the Royal Navy. |
| HMS Hero | Third rate | 74 | 1 | | 1759 | Plymouth Dockyard | |
| Hercules class | Third rate | 74 | 2 | | 1759–1760 | Deptford Dockyard, Woolwich Dockyard | Developed from the Dublin class, and HMS Hero. |
| Bellona class | Third rate | 74 | 5 | 1757–1758 | 1760–1770 | Chatham Dockyard, Deptford Dockyard, Plymouth Dockyard | |
| Ramillies class | Third rate | 74 | 9 | 1760–1762 | 1762–1778 | Chatham Dockyard; Deptford Dockyard; John Barnard, Harwich; Thomas West, Deptford; John and William Wells, Deptford; Henry Bird and Roger Fisher, Milford Haven; Plymouth Dockyard | Based on the Bellona class. |
| HMS Asia | Third rate | 64 | 1 | 1758 | 1771 | Portsmouth Dockyard | First 64-gun ship built for the Royal Navy. |
| Southampton class | Frigate | 32 | 4 | 1756 | 1757–1759 | Robert Inwood, Rotherhithe; Deptford Dockyard; John Quallet, Rotherhithe; John Barnard & John Turner, Harwich; Robert Batson, Limehouse | First single-deck frigates. Designed with sweep ports (for rowing) along the lower deck. |
| Niger class | Frigate | 32 | 11 | 1757–1763 | 1758–1769 | Thomas Stanton & Company, Rotherhithe; Deptford Dockyard; John Barnard & John Turner, Harwich; Thomas West, Deptford; Sheerness Dockyard; Chatham Dockyard; Hugh Blaydes, Hull; Hugh Blaydes & Thomas Hodgson, Hull | Developed from the Southampton-class frigates. |
| Lowestoffe class | Frigate | 28 | 2 | 1755 | 1756 | John Greaves, Limehouse; John Randall's yard, Nelson Dock, Rotherhithe (both completed at Deptford Dockyard) | Based on the prototype 28-gun frigate Lyme, "with such alterations as may tend to the better stowing of men and carrying for guns". |
| Coventry class | Frigate | 28 | 18 | 1756–1783 | 1757–1787 | Henry Adams, Buckler's Hard; Henry Bird, Rotherhithe; Gorill & Pownall, Liverpool; Thomas Seward, Rochester; Woolwich Dockyard; Chatham Dockyard; Deptford Dockyard; Thomas Stanton & Co, Rotherhithe; Robert Inwood, Rotherhithe; Pleasant Fenn, East Cowes; Portsmouth Dockyard; Moody Janvrin, Bursledon; Richard Chitty, Milford; Sheerness Dockyard | Largely modeled on the Lowestoffe class. Five ships were built in fir instead of oak as an experiment. |
| HMS Sherborne | Cutter | 10 | 1 | 1763 | 1764 | Woolwich Dockyard | |

== Death ==
Sir Thomas Slade died on 23 February 1771 in Bath, and is buried in St Clement's churchyard, Grimwade Street, Ipswich. His will was proven on 19 March 1771 (Prob. 11/965). His wife Hannah and her parents were buried next to the west boundary of the churchyard.

== Legacy ==
His 1745 apprentice John Henslow (later Sir John) also became Chief Surveyor to the Navy in 1784 and was the grandfather of Charles Darwin's mentor John Henslow.

The headland Slade Point (21.0633°S 149.2250°E) on the central Queensland coast was named after him by James Cook on his first voyage of exploration in 1770.
