= Marsouin =

Marsouin or Marsouins (French, 'porpoise') may refer to:

- French submarine Marsouin, the name of two boats
- Marsouin (1788 ship), a French ship
- AS Marsouins, a Réunion football club
- Rivière des Marsouins, a river on the Indian Ocean island of Réunion
- Marsouins, nickname of French Troupes de Marine
