= HMS Experiment (1784) =

Fifth-rate of the Royal Navy

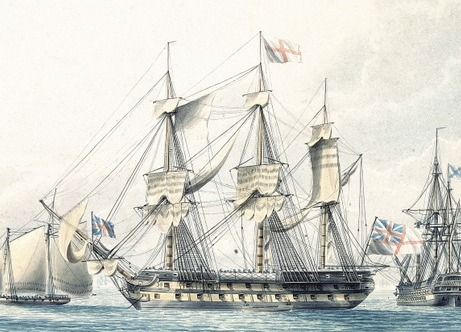
- Experiment's sister ship HMS Argo

History

United Kingdom
- Name: HMS Experiment
- Ordered: 13 July 1780
- Builder: Robert Fabian, East Cowes
- Cost: £17,364
- Laid down: June 1781
- Launched: 27 November 1784
- Completed: 11 January 1785
- Commissioned: January 1793
- Fate: Sold 8 September 1836

General characteristics
- Class & type: Roebuck-class fifth-rate
- Tons burthen: 890 35/94 (bm)
- Length: 140 ft 0 1/2 in (42.7 m) (gundeck); 115 ft 8 in (35.3 m) (keel)
- Beam: 38 ft 0 1/2 in (11.6 m)
- Draught: 9 ft 5 in (2.9 m) (forward); 13 ft 9 in (4.2 m) (aft)
- Depth of hold: 16 ft 4 in (5 m)
- Propulsion: Sails
- Complement: 300 (155 from 1798)
- Armament: 1793; Lower deck: 20 × 18-pounder guns; Upper deck: 22 × 12-pounder guns; Quarterdeck: Nil; Forecastle: 2 × 6-pounder guns; 1798; Lower deck: Nil; Upper deck: 16 × 9-pounder guns; Quarterdeck: 4 × 6-pounder guns; Forecastle: Nil

HMS Experiment was a 44-gun fifth-rate Roebuck-class ship of the Royal Navy launched in 1784. The ship spent her entire career serving as a troop ship, store ship, or lazarette. Initially stationed in the West Indies, Experiment participated in the Battle of Martinique and Invasion of Guadeloupe in 1794. While travelling to Halifax, Nova Scotia, in 1797, the ship captured several high-value Spanish merchant ships, and subsequently returned to Britain. In 1801 she travelled to the Mediterranean Sea where she participated in the Egypt Campaign, with her boats serving as landing craft at the Battle of Abukir.

From 1803 onwards Experiment only served within British waters, initially as a guard ship at Lymington, and then as a harbour store ship at Falmouth. In 1815 the ship was converted into a lazarette, being stationed at Liverpool from 1817 until 1834. The ship was sold two years later.

== Design ==
Experiment was a 44-gun, 18-pounder Roebuck-class ship. The class was a revival of the design used to construct the fifth-rate HMS Roebuck in 1769, by Sir Thomas Slade. The ships, while classified as fifth-rates, were not frigates because they carried two gun decks, of which a frigate would have only one. Roebuck was designed as such to provide the extra firepower a ship of two decks could bring to warfare but with a much lower draught and smaller profile. From 1751 to 1776 only two ships of this type were built for the Royal Navy because it was felt that they were anachronistic, with the lower (and more heavily armed) deck of guns being so low as to be unusable in anything but the calmest of waters. (Note: This problem was demonstrated in a sister ship of Experiment, HMS Argo, which two French frigates captured in 1783 because the weather was so bad she was not able to open her lower gun ports during the battle.) In the 1750s the cruising role of the 44-gun two deck ship was taken over by new 32- and 36-gun frigates, leaving the type almost completely obsolete.

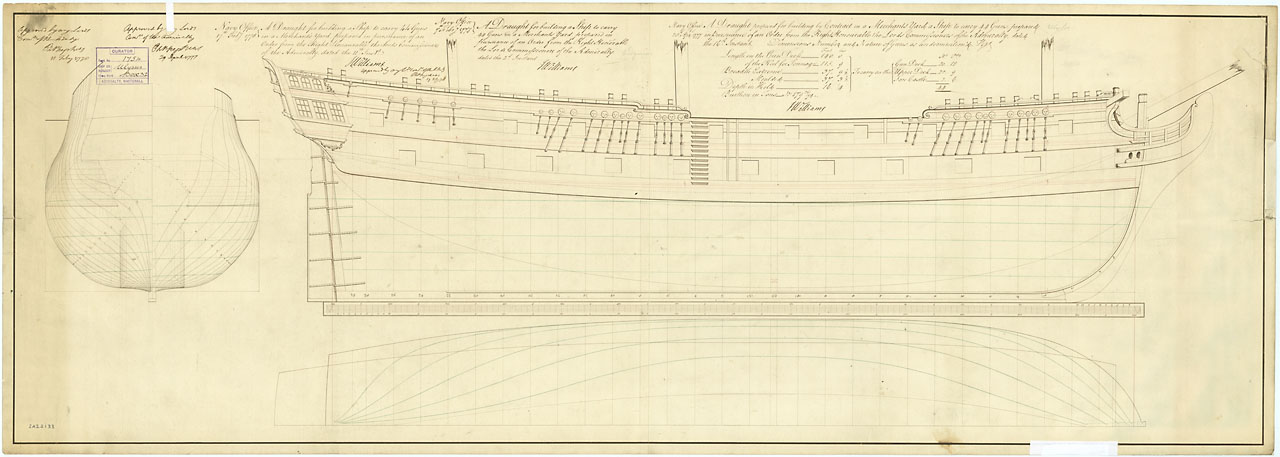
Plan of the Roebuck-class ships

When the American Revolutionary War began in 1775 a need was found for heavily armed ships that could fight in the shallow coastal waters of North America, where two-decked third-rates could not safely sail, and so the Roebuck class of nineteen ships, alongside the similar Adventure class, was ordered to the specifications of the original ships to fill this need. The frigate classes that had overtaken the 44-gun ship as the preferred design for cruisers were at this point still mostly armed with 9- and 12-pounder guns, and it was expected that the class's heavier 18-pounders would provide them with an advantage over these vessels. Frigates with larger armaments would go on to be built by the Royal Navy later on in the American Revolutionary War, but these ships were highly expensive and so Experiment and her brethren continued to be built as a cheaper alternative.

== Construction ==
Ships of the class built after 1782 received an updated armament, replacing small upper deck 9-pounder guns with more modern 12-pounders. All ships laid down after the first four of the class, including Experiment, had the double level of stern windows Roebuck had been designed with removed and replaced with a single level of windows, moving the style of the ships closer to that of a true frigate. (Note: While the earlier ships of the class had two levels of stern windows, there was only ever one level of cabins behind them.)

All but one ship of the class were contracted out to civilian dockyards for construction, and the contract for Experiment was given to Robert Fabian at East Cowes. The ship was ordered on 13 July 1780, laid down in June 1781 and launched on 27 November 1784 with the following dimensions: 140 feet 0 1/2 inch (42.7 m) along the gun deck, 115 feet 8 inches (35.3 m) at the keel, with a beam of 38 feet 0 1/2 inch (11.6 m) and a depth in the hold of 16 feet 4 inches (5 m). Her draught, which made the class so valued in the American Revolutionary War, was 9 feet 5 inches (2.9 m) forward and 13 feet 9 inches (4.2 m) aft. She measured 890 35/94 tons burthen. The fitting out process for Experiment was completed on 11 January 1785 at Portsmouth Dockyard.

Experiment, being one of the later ships of the class, received an armament of twenty 18-pounder long guns on her lower deck, with twenty-two 12-pounders on the upper deck. These were complemented by two 6-pounders on the forecastle; the quarterdeck was unarmed. The ship was to have a crew of 300 men. Her name was a historical one of Royal Navy use, originating in about 1667.

== Service ==
Work on Experiment continued slowly after her completion; she received her copper sheathing in September 1790. The ship was eventually put into commission seven years after her completion. With the wartime necessity of using the obsolete ships as frontline warships now at an end, most ships of Experiment's type were taken out of service. While lacking modern fighting capabilities, the design still provided a fast ship, and so the Comptroller of the Navy, Sir Charles Middleton, pressed them into service as troop ships. She was commissioned as an en flute troop ship under the command of Commander Simon Miller in January 1793. As a troop ship, vessels of the Roebuck class had their crew decreased to 155.

=== West Indies ===
Scene from the Battle of Martinique, in which Experiment participated

Experiment was then fitted as a troop ship at Portsmouth, completed on 12 February. The ship sailed for the Leeward Islands Station on 26 February as part of a convoy. She carried on board 300 members of the Royal Artillery, stopping first at Gibraltar before arriving in the West Indies on 26 November. There she served as an armed store ship. In this role, in 1794 Experiment participated in operations to capture Martinique and Guadeloupe. She continued to transport troops as well, taking soldiers from Guadeloupe to Jamaica on 28 May.

The Guadeloupe expedition was unsuccessful after several months of fighting. As part of the withdrawal, on 19 June Experiment and a transport ship took the greatly depleted British garrison of St Lucia away from the embattled island. The historian William Laird Clowes picks out Lieutenant John Barrett, the commander of Experiment at the time, as one of the naval officers who distinguished themselves during this period. The naval historian Rif Winfield, however, only records Barrett as joining the ship in August the following year. Winfield says that Experiment's next commanding officer was Commander Lancelot Skynner in January 1795, only then followed by Barrett.

On 11 March 1797 Experiment escorted ten vessels carrying 2,348 deported Caribbeans from St Vincent to the Spanish island of Roatan. Arriving thirty-one days later, the small Spanish garrison was attacked and subdued, but one of the ships protected by Experiment was sunk during the engagement. The deportees were then landed on the island. Having finished at Roatan, Experiment sailed for Halifax, Nova Scotia. While en route she came across a Spanish fleet of merchant ships sailing from Cartagena, capturing eight of nine. Barrett unloaded three of these into the other vessels, and took the remaining five on to Halifax. Barrett's share of the prize money for these was estimated to be £800,000. Having reached Halifax by 8 July, Experiment's masts were all condemned and the ship underwent considerable repairs.

=== Troop ship ===
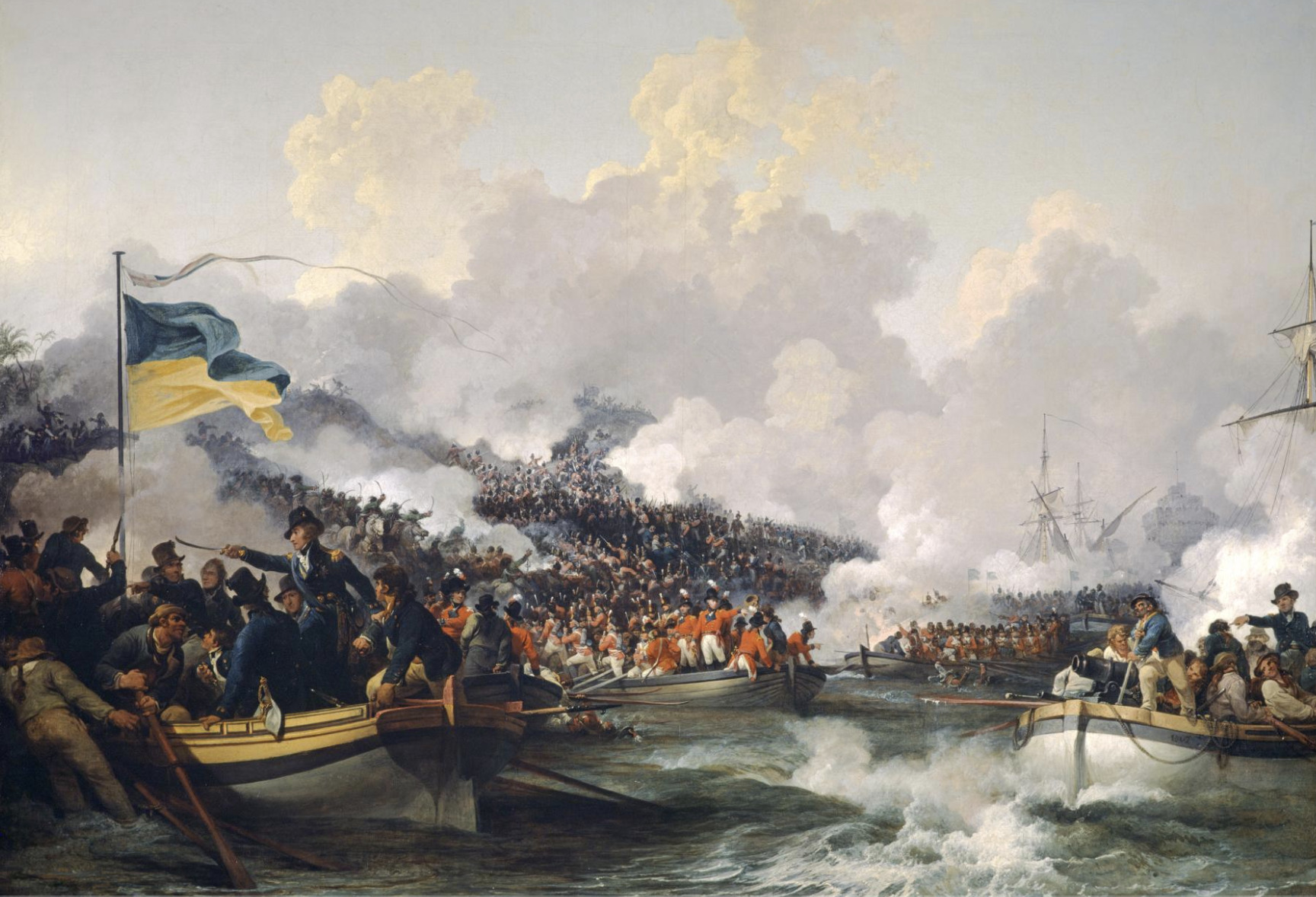
The Landing of British Troops at Aboukir by Philip James de Loutherbourg. Boats from Experiment took part in the landings at the Battle of Abukir.

The ship returned to Britain as escort to a convoy in November, where at Deptford Dockyard she was again refitted as a troop ship. At this time she was also re-armed, receiving instead sixteen 9-pounders on the upper deck and four 6-pounders on the quarterdeck. This work was completed in May 1798, prior to which the ship was recommissioned under the command of Commander John Saville in February. Experiment was one of three troop ships that conveyed the Royal Lancashire Militia from Plymouth to Ireland on 6 September. After the British victory at the Battle of Tory Island, Experiment was then employed in taking 2,000 French prisoners of war from Plymouth to Portsmouth on 31 October. On 21 July the following year the ship was part of a squadron that arrived at Elsinore in preparation to sail to Reval to take on board Russian troops for the Anglo-Russian Invasion of Holland.

Experiment sailed to the Mediterranean Sea in February 1801, where she participated in operations of the Egypt Campaign as part of Admiral Lord Keith's fleet. Experiment carried part of the expeditionary army, but was not one of the ships involved in the initial landings at the Battle of Abukir on 8 March. Several of Experiment's small boats were however used as landing craft for the operation, embarking soldiers from another troop ship. Saville served on land with the army during these operations. Continuing in the Mediterranean, Commander George Mackenzie took over from Saville in January 1802, and in November 1803 sailed Experiment back to Britain.

=== Harbour service ===
From December Experiment served, still en flute, as the guard ship at Lymington. She continued in that role until January 1805. In May Lieutenant Robert Yule assumed command of Experiment, which was then refitted as a harbour store ship between July and October for service at Falmouth. Yule did not staying long with the ship, being replaced by Lieutenant William Stewart in August, before the end of the work.

While serving at Falmouth Experiment underwent several more changes in command, with Lieutenant Bennett Fellowes arriving in November, before being replaced by Lieutenant James Fegen in April the following year. Fegen was the longest serving commander of Experiment, staying with the ship until 1810 when Commander James Slade came on board. Slade commanded Experiment until 1814, when her term at Falmouth ended and she was put in ordinary at Portsmouth. In July the following year the ship underwent another change, being converted into a lazarette. In this new role she was stationed at Liverpool from 1817 until 1834. Finally out of service, Experiment was sold for £1,420 on 8 September 1836.
