= HMS Lutine (1793) =

Fifth-rate frigate of the Royal Navy

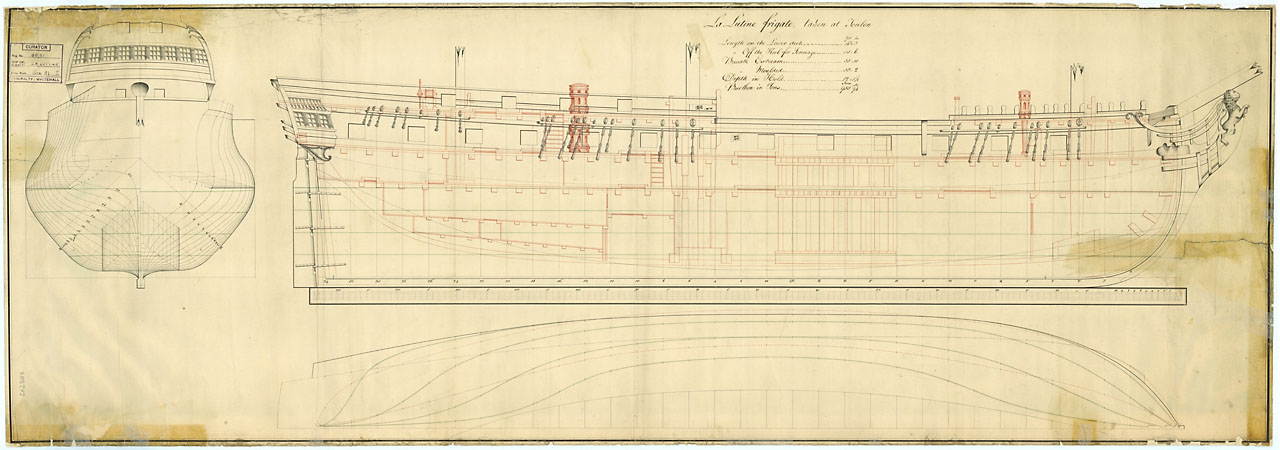
- Ship plan of Lutine

History

France
- Name: Lutine
- Namesake: Lutine is the feminine form of Lutin. (Note: Lutin translates as "the tease" or "tormentress" or more literally "imp". While this is the way the name of the ship is usually translated for English readers, in French, it is the feminine form of lutin which means imp as a noun and impish as an adjective. When the ship was originally named in French, the concept in mind was probably "sprite", though the word carries a range of associations – including foreplay – and derives from Old French netun, ultimately from the Latin, Neptunus.)
- Ordered: 23 October 1778
- Builder: Toulon shipyard
- Laid down: March 1779
- Launched: 11 September 1779
- Commissioned: November 1779
- Captured: August 1793

Great Britain
- Name: HMS Lutine
- Acquired: August 1793
- Fate: Wrecked 9 October 1799

General characteristics
- Class & type: Magicienne-class frigate
- Displacement: 1,100 tonneaux
- Tons burthen: 600 port tonneaux
- Length: 44.2 m (145 ft)
- Beam: 11.2 m (37 ft)
- Draught: 5.2 m (17 ft) (22 French feet)
- Sail plan: Full-rigged ship
- Armament: 26 × 12-pounder long guns; 6 × 6-pounder long guns

Lutine was a frigate which served in both the French Navy and the Royal Navy. She was launched by the French in 1779. The ship passed to British control in 1793 and was taken into service as HMS Lutine. She sank among the West Frisian Islands during a storm in 1799.

She was built as a French Magicienne-class frigate with 32 guns, and was launched at Toulon in 1779. During the French Revolution, Lutine came under French Royalist control. On 18 December 1793, she was one of sixteen ships handed over to a British fleet at the end of the Siege of Toulon, to prevent her being captured by the French Republicans. In 1795, she was rebuilt by the British as a fifth-rate frigate with 38 guns. She served thereafter in the North Sea, where she was part of the blockade of Amsterdam.

Lutine sank during a storm at Vlieland in the West Frisian Islands on 9 October 1799, whilst carrying a large shipment of gold. Shifting sandbanks disrupted salvage attempts, and the majority of the cargo has never been recovered. Lloyd's of London has preserved her salvaged bell – the Lutine Bell – which is now used for ceremonial purposes at their headquarters in London.

== French career ==
In 1780, Lutine was under Cambray, and called the ports of Foilleri, Smyrna and Malta, before returning to Toulon, escorting a convoy. Later that year, she was under Garnier de Saint-Antonin, conducting missions in the Eastern Mediterranean.

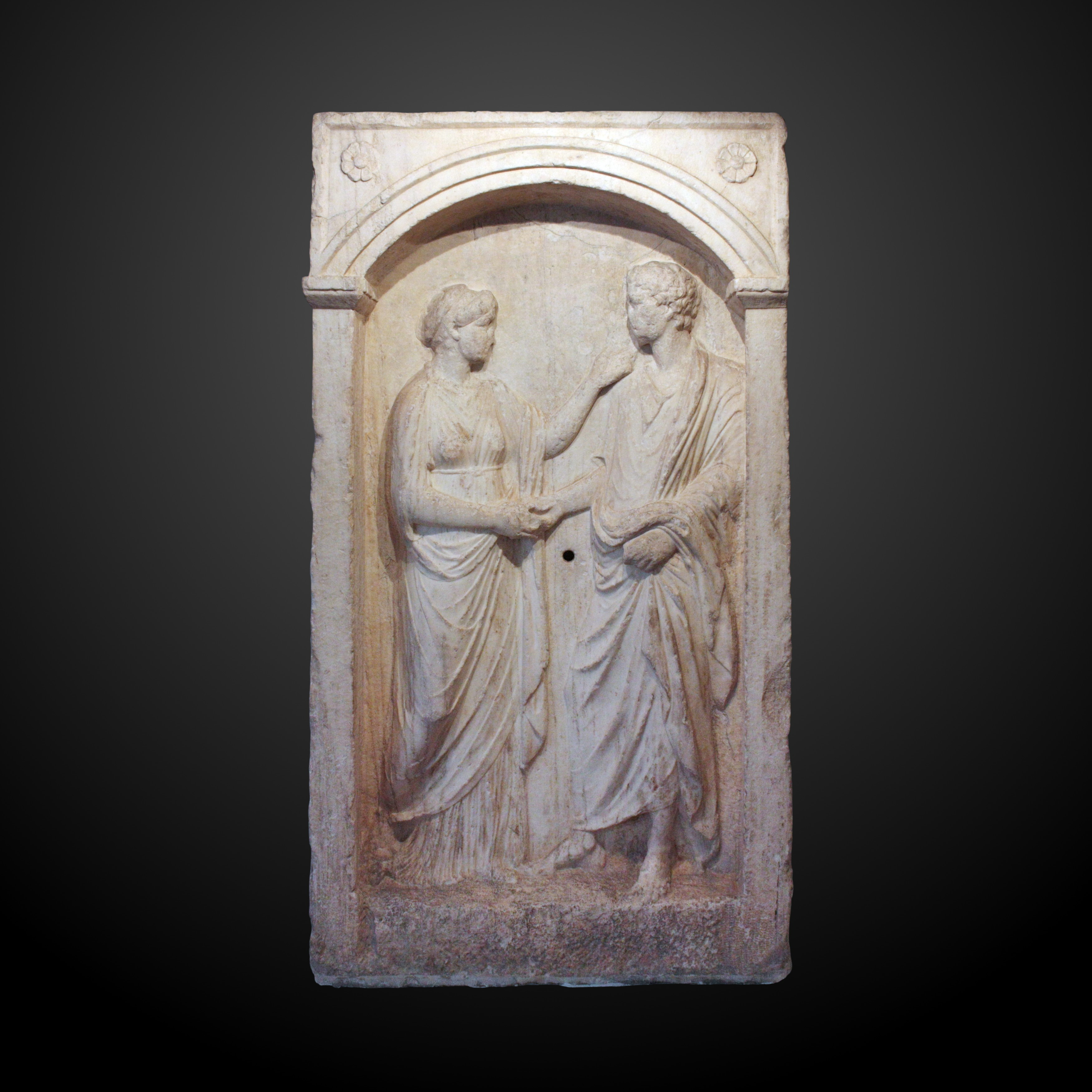
Attic funerary stele brought from Athens by Lutine under Flotte, Museum of Grenoble, Inv. 376.

In 1781, she was under Flotte, also escorting convoys in the Eastern Mediterranean and calling Marseille, Malta, Smyrna and Foilleri. At Athens, Flotte was gifted an antique relief, that he reported to Navy Minister Castries. (Note: The relief in question is now at Museum of Grenoble, Inv. 376.) From 13 July 1782 to 16 July 1783, she continued the same missions under Gineste.

With the outbreak of the War of the First Coalition, Lutine was recommissioned as a bomb ship in 1792.

== British career ==
On 27 September 1793, the royalists in Toulon surrendered the city, naval dockyards, arsenal, and French Mediterranean fleet to a British fleet commanded by Vice Admiral Lord Hood. The French vessels included:

...seventeen ships of the line (one 120, one 80 and fifteen 74s), five frigates and eleven corvettes. In various stages of refitting in the New Basin were four ships of the line (one 120, one 80, and two 74s) and a frigate. Mainly in the Old Basin and, for the most part, awaiting middling or large repair, were eight ships of the line (one 80 and seven 74s), five frigates and two corvettes.

Lutine was one of the ships from the Old Basin. During the siege of Toulon, the British converted Lutine to a bomb vessel that fired mortars at the besieging French artillery batteries, which were under the command of Napoleon Bonaparte. When they abandoned Toulon on 19 December, the British took Lutine with them.

The ship was sent to Portsmouth in December 1793 for a refit and commissioned as HMS Lutine.

The loss of the Lutine occurred during the Second Coalition of the French Revolutionary Wars, in which an Anglo-Russian army landed in the Batavian Republic (now the Netherlands), which had been occupied by the French since 1795. (The French had captured the Dutch fleet the previous year in a cavalry charge over the frozen polders.) Admiral Duncan had heavily defeated the Dutch fleet in 1797 at the Battle of Camperdown and the remainder of the Dutch fleet was captured on 30 August 1799 by the Duke of York.

During this period Lutine served as an escort, guiding transports in and out of the shoal waters around North Holland.

In October 1799 under command of Captain Lancelot Skynner she was employed in carrying about £1.2 million in bullion and coin (equivalent in value to £119 million in 2025), from Yarmouth to Cuxhaven in order to provide Hamburg's banks with funds in order to prevent a stock market crash and, possibly, for paying troops in North Holland. In the evening of 9 October 1799, during a heavy northwesterly gale, the ship under Captain Lancelot Skynner, having made unexpected leeway, was drawn by the tidal stream flowing into the Waddenzee, onto a sandbank in Vlie off the island of Terschelling, in the West Frisian Islands. There, she became a total loss. All but one of her approximately 240 passengers and crew perished in the breaking seas.

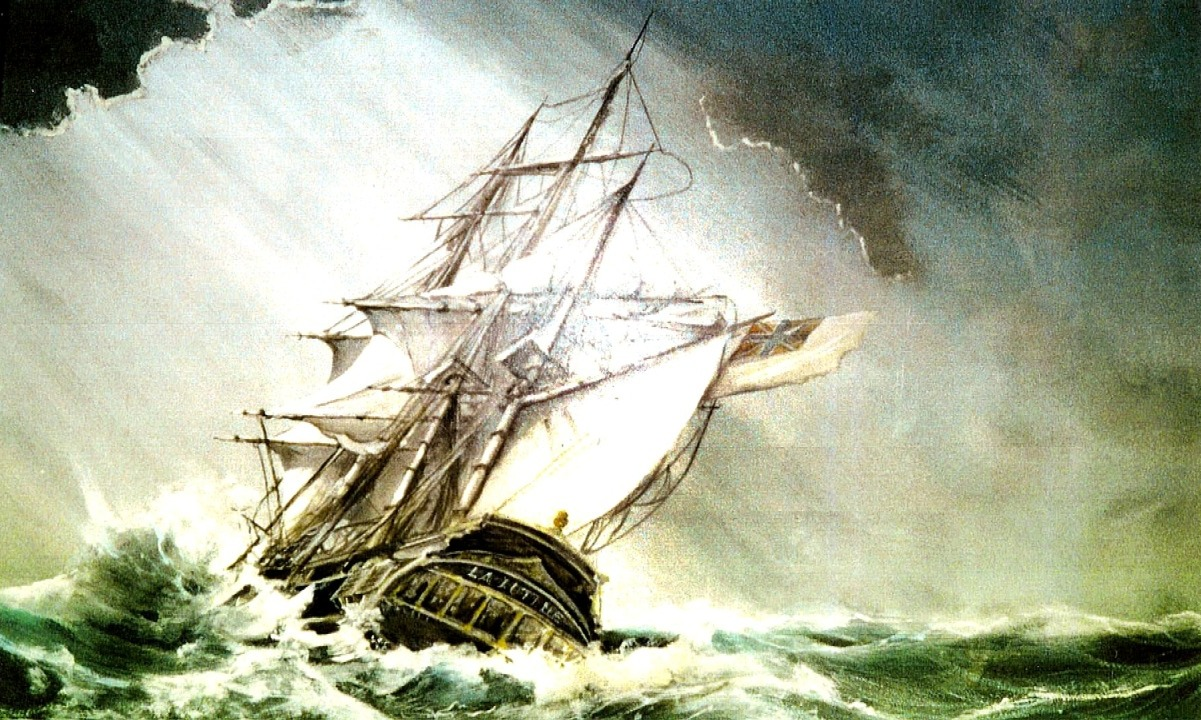
HMS Lutine in distress

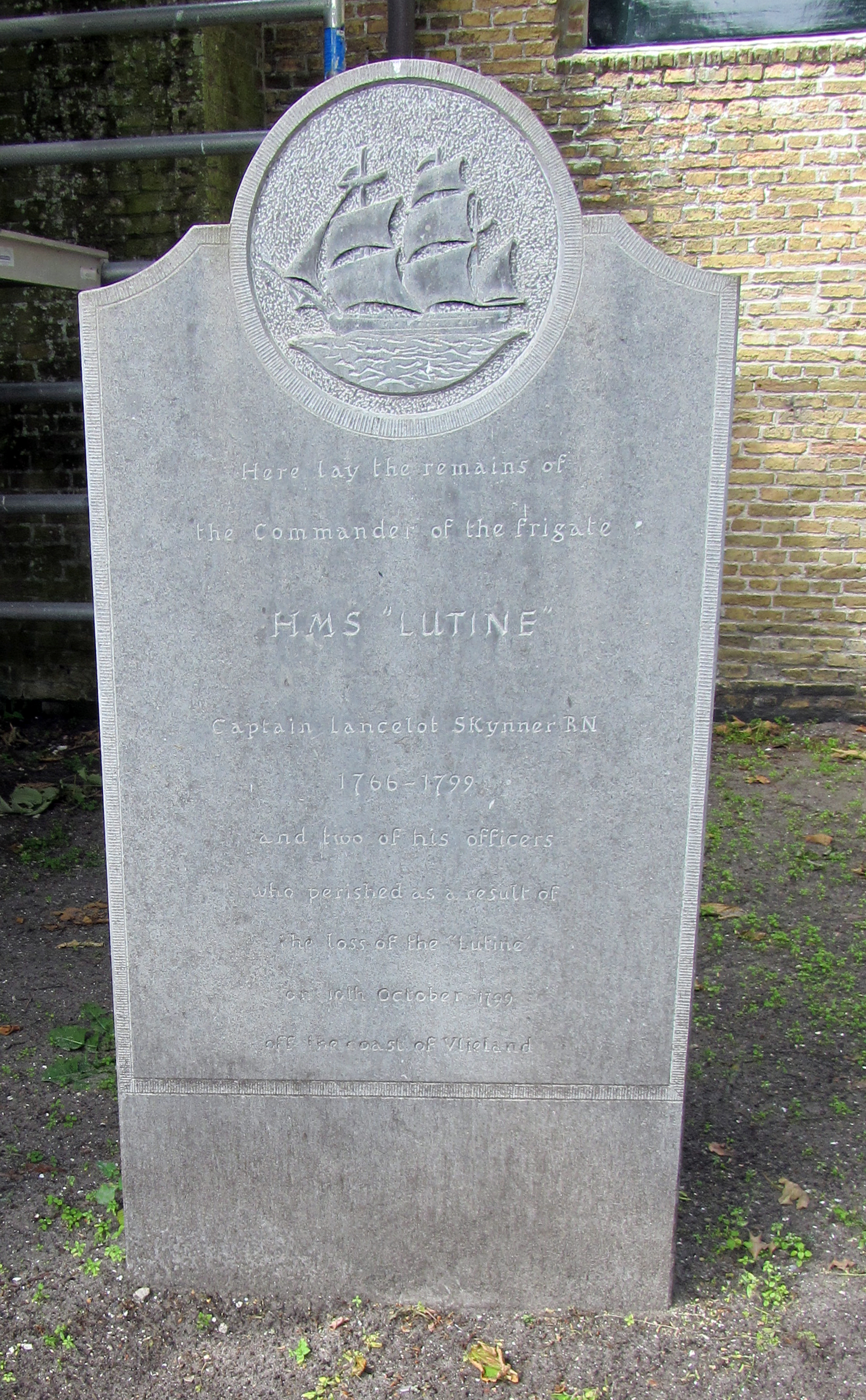
Grave of Captain Lancelot Skynner and two of his officers (Vlieland churchyard)

Captain Portlock, (Note: Captain Portlock commanded the sloop HMS Arrow (28 guns), and HMS Wolverine (12 guns)) commander of the British squadron at Vlieland, reported the loss, writing to the Admiralty in London on 10 October:

Sir, It is with extreme pain that I have to state to you the melancholy fate of H.M.S. Lutine, which ship ran on to the outer bank of the Fly [an anglicisation of 'Vlie'] Island passage on the night of the 9th inst. in a heavy gale of wind from the NNW, and I am much afraid the crew with the exception of one man, who was saved on a part of the wreck, have perished. This man, when taken up, was almost exhausted. He is at present tolerably recovered, and relates that the Lutine left Yarmouth Roads on the morning of the 9th inst. bound for the Texel, and that she had on board a considerable quantity of money.

The wind blowing strong from the NNW, and the lee tide coming on, rendered it impossible with Schowts [probably schuits, local fishing vessels] or other boats to go out to aid her until daylight in the morning, and at that time nothing was to be seen but parts of the wreck.

I shall use every endeavour to save what I can from the wreck, but from the situation she is lying in, I am afraid little will be recovered.

Three officers, including Captain Skynner, were apparently buried in the Vlieland churchyard, and around two hundred others were buried in a mass grave near the Brandaris lighthouse in Terschelling. No memorials mark these graves. (Note: A lake outside Terschelling is known today as the Doodemanskisten (dead men's coffins), allegedly because it is also close to the place from which the wood for the coffins originated; an alternative explanation is that the name is a corruption of d'Earmeskisten, meaning a pauper's grave.)

Captain Lancelot Skynner came from Easton on the Hill, near Stamford, England, where his father was rector for many years. Plaques on the former rectory (known for a time as Lutine House) and in the church commemorate this and Captain Skynner. (Note: Another Captain Lancelot Skynner, a cousin who commanded HMS Bideford, also lost his life at sea in an action in the Bay of Biscay in 1760. A further Skynner (William Walker Skynner) also died at sea. He was the Navigation Officer in HMS Hampshire, which sank after hitting a mine off the north of Scotland while taking Lord Kitchener to Russia in 1916. He is commemorated on the Portsmouth Naval Memorial and the HMS Hampshire Memorial at Winchester Cathedral.)

The failure of the gold to arrive precipitated the very crisis that it had been designed to prevent.

== Legacy ==
=== Site of the wreck ===
The site of the wreck, the Vlie, was notorious for its strong currents and the danger of storms forcing ships onto the shore. The area is composed of sandbanks and shoals, which the currents continuously shift, with channels through them: in 1666, during the Second Anglo-Dutch War, Admiral Holmes had managed to penetrate these shoals and start Holmes's Bonfire, surprising the Dutch who had considered the shoals impassable. The depth of water also constantly changes, and this has caused much of the difficulty in salvage attempts.

Lutine was wrecked in a shallow channel called the IJzergat, which has now completely disappeared, between the islands of Vlieland and Terschelling. Immediately after Lutine sank, the wreck began silting up, forcing an end to salvage attempts by 1804. By chance, it was discovered in 1857 that the wreck was again uncovered, but covered again in 1859. The wreck was probably partially uncovered between 1915 and 1916, although no salvage was attempted because of World War I.

=== The gold ===
Lloyd's archives were destroyed by the fire at Lloyd's headquarters in 1838, and the amount of cargo lost is based on the estimate made by Lloyd's in 1858: £1.2 million, consisting of both silver and gold 60 years after the disaster. Only the general assessment of the cargo and the amount of insurance are known for sure. The gold was insured by Lloyd's of London, which paid the claim in full. The underwriters therefore owned the gold under rights of abandonment and later authorised attempts to salvage it. However, because of the state of war, the Dutch also laid claim to it as a prize of war.

Captain Portlock was instructed by the Admiralty on 29 October 1799 to try to recover the cargo "for the benefit of the persons to whom it belongs"; Lloyd's also sent agents to look over the wreck. The Committee for the Public Properties of Holland instructed the local Receivers of Wrecks to report on the wreck, and F.P. Robbé, the Receiver on Terschelling, was authorised in December 1799 to begin salvage operations. All three parties had drawn attention to the difficulty of salvage due to the unfavourable position of the wreck and lateness of the year. At this point, the wreck was lying in approximately 7.5 metres (25 ft) of water.

In 1821, Robbé's successor as Receiver at Terschelling, Pierre Eschauzier successfully petitioned King William I and by royal decree received the sole right:

to attempt the further salvage of the cargo of the English frigate, the "Lutine", which foundered between Terrschelling and Vlieland in the year 1799, proceeding from London and bound for Hamburg, and having a very considerable capital on board, consisting of gold and silver as well as thousands of Spanish coins, believed to amount in all to 20 million Dutch guilders. (Note: As the complete archive of Lloyds was destroyed by fire in 1838, it is not possible to know how much exactly was on board "Lutine".)

In return, the state would receive half of all recoveries. Eschauzier and his heirs therefore became the owners of the wreck by royal decree and thus are known as the 'Decretal Salvors'.

Eschauzier's attempts spurred Lloyd's to approach the British government to defend their rights to the wreck. In 1823, King William revised by subsequent decree the original decree: everything which "had been reserved to the state from the cargo of the above-mentioned frigate" was ceded to the King of Great Britain as a token "of our friendly sentiments towards the Kingdom of Great Britain, and by no means out of a conviction of England's right to any part of the aforementioned cargo." This share was subsequently ceded back to Lloyd's.

The gold was apparently stored in flimsy casks bound with weak iron hoops and the silver in casks with wooden hoops. Within a year of the wreck, these casks had largely disintegrated, and the sea had started to scatter and cover the wreck.

Lloyd's records were destroyed by fire in 1838, and the actual amount of the gold lost is now unknown. In 1858 Lloyd's estimated the total value at £1.2 million, made up of both silver and gold. Despite extended operations, over 80% remains to be salvaged. An uncorroborated newspaper report in 1869 referred to the Dutch crown jewels being on board.

=== Initial salvage attempts 1799–1938 ===
1799–1801: An 1876 account reports that fishermen-with the sanction of the Dutch government in return for two-thirds of the recovered salvage-for a year and a half prior to 1801 recovered £80,000 of Bullion consisting of 58 bars of gold; 35 bars of silver; 42,000 Spanish silver pistoles; 212 half-pistoles, 179 Spanish gold pistoles; with smaller quantities of quarter; eighth and sixteenth pistoles. A 1911 account reports that, besides the gold, silver and pistoles listed above, there was also recovered 41,697 (not 42,000) Spanish Silver pistoles; 81 double Louis d'or; 138 single Louis d'or and 4 English guineas with an estimated value of £83,000 pounds sterling. The Dutch government's two-thirds share was re-minted into £56,000 worth of Dutch guilders. Sent to England was a packet of silver spoons initialled "W.S" and recognized as belonging to Lutine's captain; likewise, a salvaged sword was identified as belonging to Lt. Charles Gustine Aufrere.

In August 1800 Robbé recovered a cask of seven gold bars, weighing 37 kilograms (82 lb) and a small chest containing 4,606 Spanish piastres. Over 4–5 September, two small casks were recovered, one with its bottom stoved in, yielding twelve gold bars. There were also other, more minor, recoveries, making this year the most successful of all the salvage attempts; however, the expenses of the salvage were still greater than the recoveries by 3,241 guilders.

In 1801, although recoveries were made, conditions were unfavourable and the wreck was already silted up. By 1804 Robbé reported: that the part of the wreck in which one is accustomed to find the precious metals has now been covered by a large piece of the side of the ship (which had previously been found hanging more or less at an angle), thus impeding the salvage work, which was otherwise possible. Salvage attempts appear to have been given up at this point.

In 1814, Pierre Eschauzier was allocated 300 guilders for salvage by the Dutch King and recovered "8 Louis d'or and 7 Spanish piastres fished out of the wreck of the Lutine".

In 1821, Eschauzier put together a syndicate with the intention of using a diving bell manned by amphibicque Englishmen. However, Mr. Rennie, the engineer died that year; in 1822, the diving bell arrived at the end of June, but operations were frustrated by bad weather and silting-up of the wreck; at this stage the wreck was reckoned to be 1 metre (3 ft 3 in) under the sand. Although salvage attempts continued until 1829, little was gained and the diving bell was sold on to the Dutch navy. In 1835, the sandbank covering Lutine shrank and moved southwards, with the depth of water being 9–10 metres (30–33 ft) and desultory attempts at salvage were made. Further attempts to raise capital were largely unsuccessful.

In 1857, it was discovered by chance that "a channel had formed straight across the Goudplaat sandbank, leading over the wreck, so that the latter was not merely clear of sand but had also sunk further below the surface with the channel [...] the bows and stern, together with the decks and sides, had come completely away, leaving only the keel with the keelson above it and some ribs attached to this". Recovery work immediately recommenced, now using helmeted divers (helmduikers) and bell divers (klokduikers), the latter using a bell called the Hollandsche Duiker ('Dutch diver'). However, a large number of unauthorised salvors also displayed an interest, which led the Dutch government to station a gunboat in the area. Over the course of the season approximately 20,000 guilders-worth of specie was recovered.

The 1858 season was hampered by poor weather but yielded 32 gold bars and 66 silver bars. This ship's bell was also discovered in this year (see below). In 1859 it became apparent that the treasure had been stored towards the stern of the ship, and that the stern was lying on its side, with the starboard side uppermost and the port side sunk into the sand. This area, however, only gave up 4 gold bars, 1 silver bar, and over 3,500 piastres.

In 1859 the rudder from the wreck was salvaged. This was transported to Lloyd's and used to make a desk and a chair for Lloyd's of London. These are still kept at Lloyd's and used on special occasions. On the table is a plaque of silver with the text:

H.B.M. Ship La Lutine.

32 Gun Frigate Commanded by Captain Lancelot Skynner, R.N. Sailed from Yarmouth Roads On the morning of the 9th October, 1799 with a large amount of specie on board, And was wrecked off the Island of Vlieland the same night,

When all on board were lost except one man.

The chair has a similar inscription.

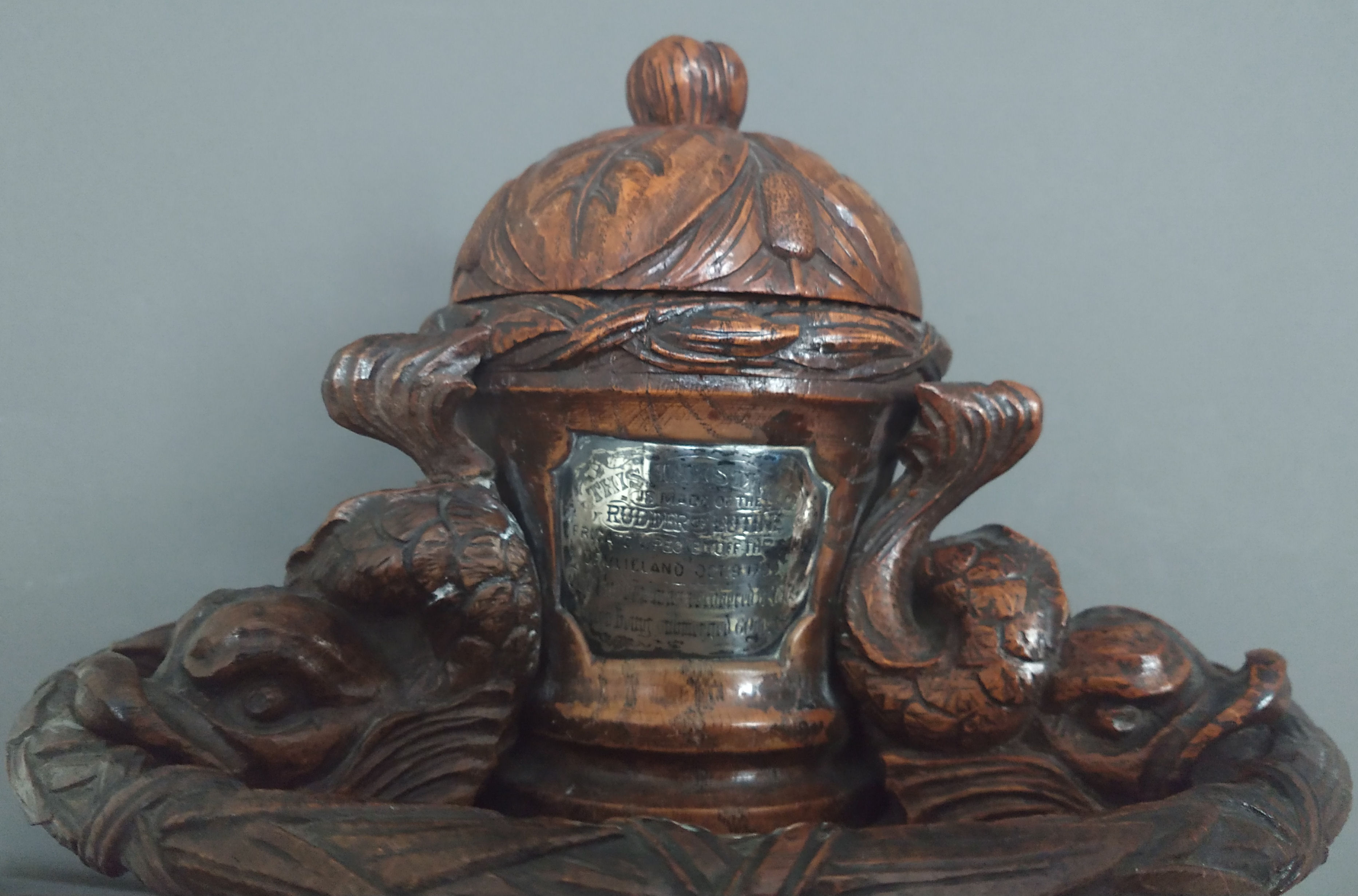
Lutine Ink stand

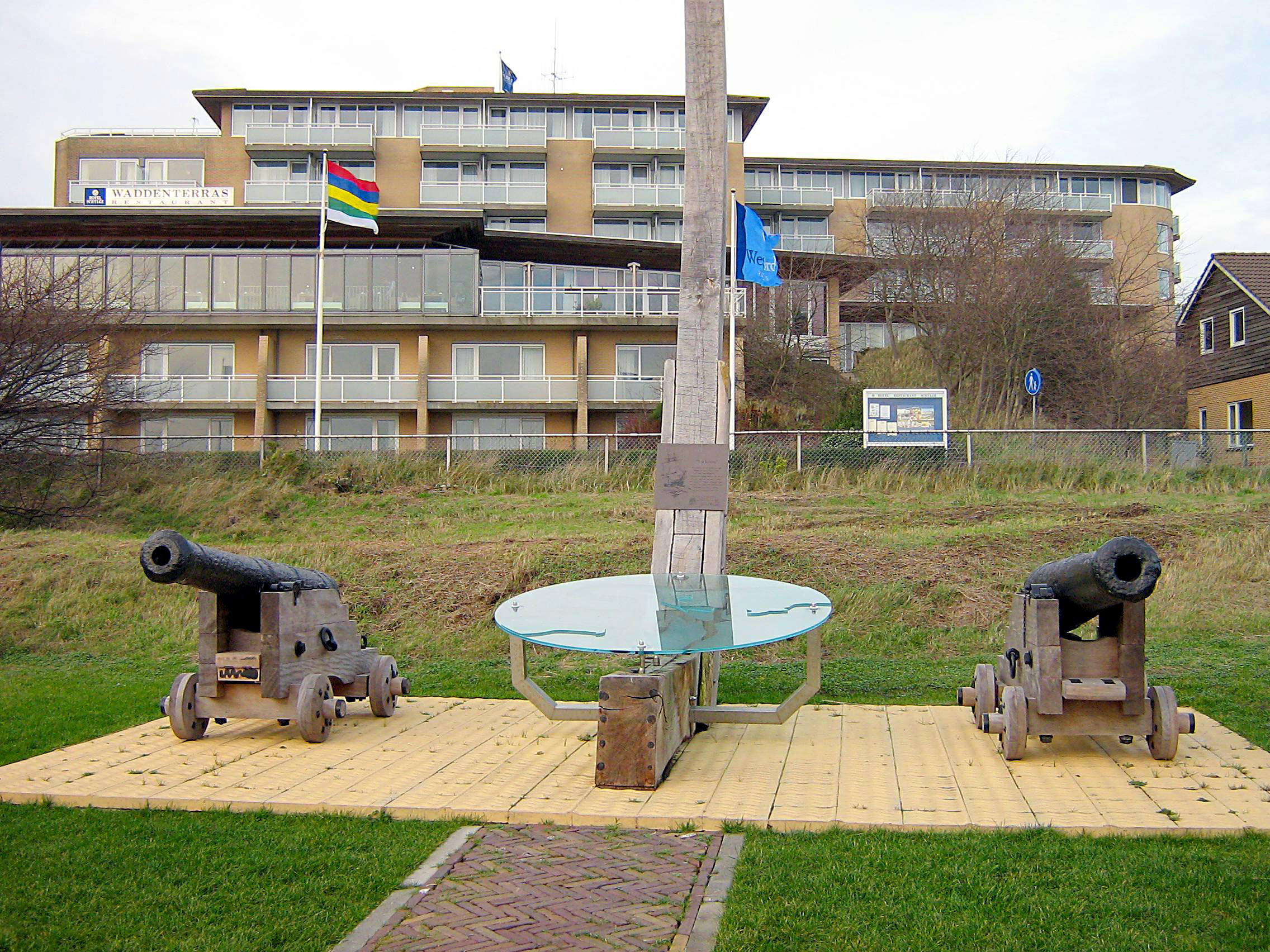
Lutine Monument at Terschelling

Less known is that in addition to the table and chair, two ink sets are also made from the wood of the rudder. These feature lloyd's coat of arms and a silver plaque with the text: Ink set made of lutine rudder with silver plaque THIS INKSTAND is made of the RUDDER of LUTINE Frigate wrecked off the island of Vlieland Oct. 9. 1799. The Rudder was recovered in 1859 after being submerged 60 years

By 1860, the depth of the wreck had reached 14 metres (46 ft) and the quantity of salvage was declining. Nonetheless, over the four years salvage worth half a million guilders had been recovered: 41 gold bars, 64 silver bars, and 15,350 various coins, and the syndicate paid a 136% return; attempts were finally ended in 1863 as the wreck again silted up. (Note: A 1912 account claims the 1858 effort recovered $140,000 bullion in slabs and by 1860 $220,000 in bullion had been recovered.)

After 1860 to 1889 attempts at salvage are reported to have recovered 11,164 coins valued at $4,600.

In 1867, an inventor, Willem Hendrik ter Meulen, proposed using a 'zandboor' ('sand drill'), a device which forced water into the sandy sea bed in order to clear a way for a helmet diver and signed a three-year contract, subsequently extended for another three years and then a further twenty years. The plan was that when the depth of water reached 7 metres (23 ft), the machine would be used to excavate the same depth of sand down onto the wreck. Ter Meulen bought a steel-hulled, paddlewheel-driven 50 h.p. steam tug, Antagonist. The engine was modified such that it could be disconnected from the paddlewheels and used to drive the centrifugal 'whirlpool' pump. The pump was capable of pumping water at a rate of 21.5 cubic metres per minute (760 cu ft/min), but tests showed that 1.5 cubic metres per minute (53 cu ft/min) was sufficient, and the 'zandboor' took only a couple of minutes to penetrate through to the wreck. It was also found that the sand did not collapse once the diver descended through the drilled hole into the cavity excavated by the machine.

Unfortunately, the wreck remained heavily silted up, with the depth of water varying between a high of 2 metres (6 ft 7 in) (in 1873) to a low of 5 metres (16 ft) (in 1868 and again in 1884). However, ter Meulen was responsible for re-establishing the landmarks used for taking transits of the wreck site and for establishing its position: 53°20′35″N 5°01′34″E.

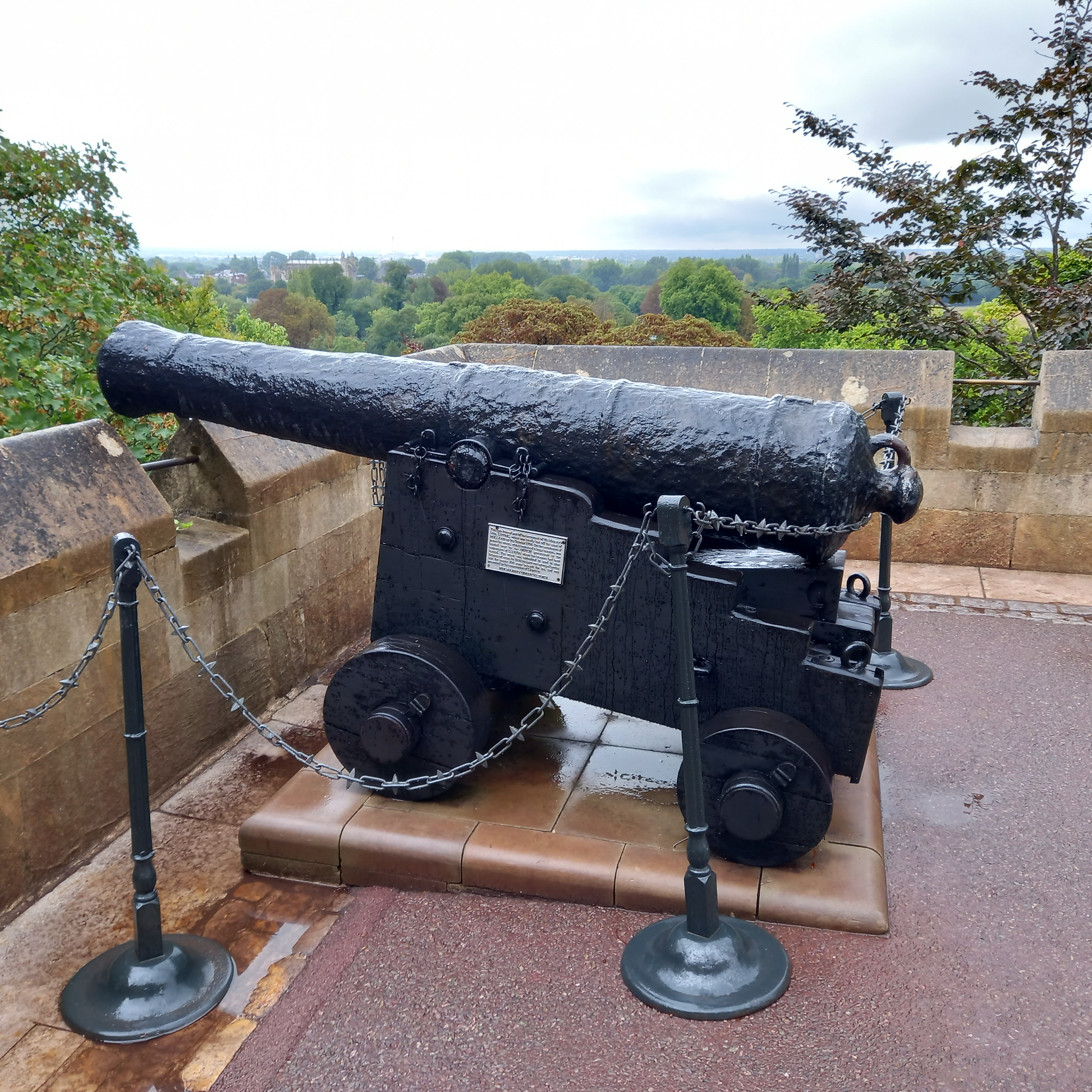
A gun from Lutine, presented by Lloyd's to Queen Victoria in 1886 and now displayed on the North Terrace at Windsor Castle.

In 1886 a cannon was salvaged and presented by Lloyd's to Queen Victoria: it is now on display at Windsor Castle. Another was offered to the City of London Corporation and is on display at the Guildhall, London. A final cannon was passed to the Lloyd's sports club in Essex. More are on display in Amsterdam's Stedelijk Museum, and at least four are in Terschelling. A number of coins and small relics were recovered to the value of £700.

In 1891 a few small coins were found, and in 1896 a cannon was presented to Queen Wilhelmina.

In 1898, 2 long cwt (200 lb or 100 kg) of timber was salvaged. This was donated to the Liverpool Underwriters' Association, whose chairman had it made into a chair. Where this chair is now is unknown.

In 1911 a Salvage Company was organized to salvage the reported treasure. In 1912 this effort is reported to have recovered silver coins, cannon, cannonballs, grapeshot and an anchor but no treasure.

In 1913 the two bower anchors, carried at the ship's bow, each weighing 3,900 kilograms (8,600 lb) were recovered and put on display in Amsterdam. Consideration was given by Lloyd's to setting the anchors up as a monument behind the Royal Exchange in place of a statue to Sir Robert Peel, but this was not carried out and only the wooden stocks, marked Lutine were forwarded to Lloyd's. Reportedly the outbreak of World War I prevented another salvage attempt.

In 1933 an attempt was made to salvage the reported treasure, but was stopped when the salvage bell was wrecked by a World War I naval mine. This was followed by a further unsuccessful attempt in 1934.

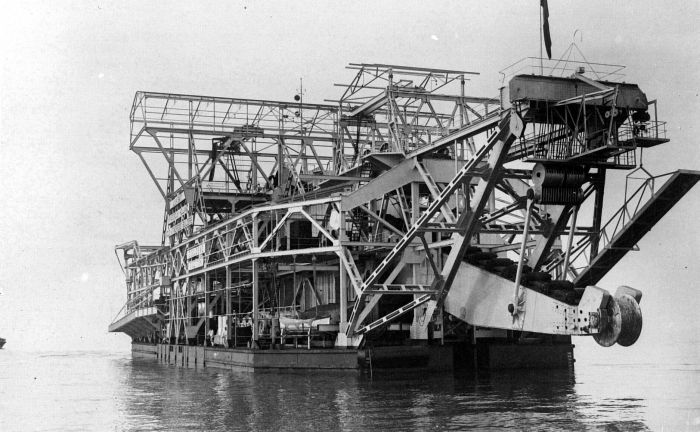
The Doejoengdredge, of the same type as the Karimata, used in 1938 to excavate the site of the sinking of the Lutine.

In 1938, yet another attempt was made to salvage the reported treasure. During this attempt, the largest dredger in the world (75 metres long, 23 metres wide), Karimata, which was operated by the Anglo–Dutch Billiton mining company. Despite these spectacular means, only one gold bar was raised on this occasion, along with 8 gold and 123 silver coins, 13 tons of steel, 3 tons of lead, 18 cubic meters of wreck wood, 5 cannons and some other objects. The expedition, which cost Billiton 442,500 Dutch guilders, brought a return of only 189,035.

In 1956, the Dutch engineer van Wienen proposed the construction of a vast floating pontoon (35 meters in diameter) to explore up to 10 meters deep in the sand while following the path of the shipwrecked ship from its stranding to its dislocation. But funding is not found for this ambitious project of 1.5 million guilders and its "plunging saucer" remains at the project stage 36.

In 1979, at the request of New Zealand underwater treasure hunters Lyle Henry Mortmore and Kelly Tarlton37, a tracking campaign is led by the company Oretech, which locates more than 4,000 objects using the latest information technologies. This makes it possible to establish with precision what was the trajectory of the Lutine in perdition. The following year, an American supply ship, the Yak, equipped with two large turbines to evacuate large quantities of sand by the pressure of the jet, was leased. While this method has proven itself in other cases of sandblasted wrecks, and despite the advanced technology that has been used for spotting, this new yard is another disappointment. The turbines dig wells 25 meters in diameter and eight meters deep in the space of half an hour, but only various debris, anchors and a fragment of pipe lost by a dredge during a previous site are recovered. The fact that these discoveries belonged to the Lutine could not be guaranteed, but they were shipped to New Zealand where Kelly Tarlton exhibited them as coming from the Lutine in her wreck museum in Waitangi.

=== The Lloyd's Act 1871 ===
A brief history of the loss and salvage attempts is given in the preamble to the Lloyd's Act 1871:

And whereas in or about the year 1799 a vessel of war of the Royal Navy, named the Lutine, was wrecked on the coast of Holland with a considerable amount of specie on board, insured by underwriters at Lloyd's, being members of the Society, and others, and Holland being then at war with this country the vessel and cargo were captured, and some years afterwards the King of the Netherlands authorized certain undertakers to attempt the further salvage of the cargo on the conditions (among others) that they should pay all expenses, and that one half of all that should be recovered should belong to them, and that the other half should go to the Government of the Netherlands, and subsequently the King of the Netherlands ceded to King George the Fourth on behalf of the Society of Lloyd's, the share in the cargo which had been so reserved to the Government of the Netherlands:

And whereas from time to time operations of salving from the wreck of the Lutine have been carried on, and a portion of the sum recovered, amounting to about twenty-five thousand pounds, is by virtue of the cession aforesaid in the custody or under the control of the Committee for managing the affairs of Lloyd's: [...]

And whereas it is expedient that the operations of salving from the wreck of the Lutine be continued, and that provision be made for the application in that behalf, as far as may be requisite, of money that may hereafter be received from those operations, and for the application to public or other purposes of the aforesaid sum of twenty-five thousand pounds, and of the unclaimed residue of money to be hereafter received as aforesaid [...]

The ownership of the remaining, unsalved, gold is vested in half shares between the 'decretal salvors' and the Society of Lloyd's, Lloyd's ownership being governed under the terms of the Lloyd's Act 1871, §35:

Salvage operations as to wreck of Lutine The Society may from time to time do or join in doing all such lawful things as they think expedient with a view to further salving from the wreck of the Lutine, and hold, receive, and apply for that purpose so much of the money to be received by means of salving therefrom as they from time to time think fit, and the net money produced thereby, and the said sum of twenty-five thousand pounds, shall be applied for purposes connected with shipping or marine insurance, according to a scheme to be prepared by the Society, and confirmed by Order of Her Majesty in Council, on the recommendation of the Board of Trade, after or subject to such public notice to claimants of any part of the money aforesaid to come in, and such investigation of claims, and any such barring of claims not made or not proved, and such reservation of rights (if any), as the Board of Trade think fit.

=== The Lutine Bell ===
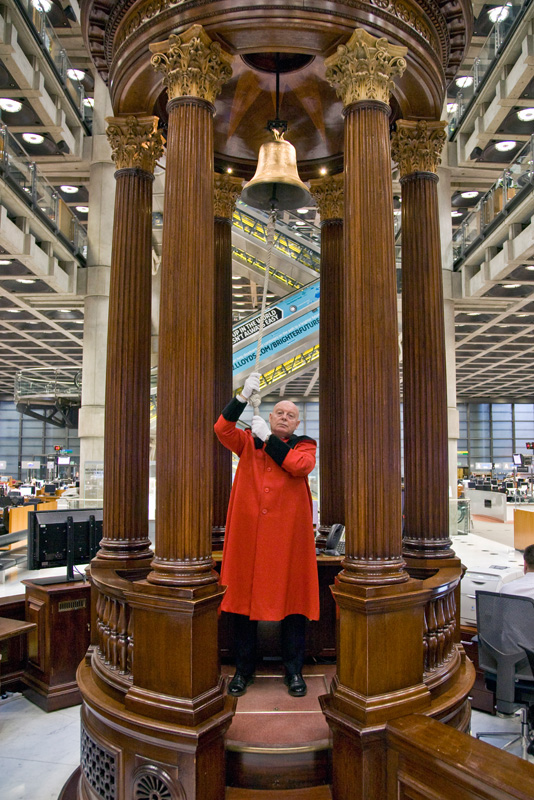
Internal shot of Rostrum at Lloyd's and Lutine Bell

The ship's bell (engraved "ST. JEAN – 1779") was recovered on 17 July 1858. The bell was found entangled in the chains originally running from the ship's wheel to the rudder, and was originally left in this state before being separated and re-hung from the rostrum of the Underwriting Room at Lloyd's. It weighs 48 kilograms (106 lb) and is 46 centimetres (18 in) in diameter. It remains a mystery why the name on the bell does not correspond with that of the ship. The bell was traditionally struck when news of an overdue ship arrived – once for the loss of a ship (i.e. bad news), and twice for her return (i.e. good news). The bell was sounded to stop the transaction of business while all brokers and underwriters were made aware of the news simultaneously. This was because reinsurance on an overdue vessel was often placed (so that an underwriter could close their books on a block of older business), so making the latest information on a ship highly material to a partly placed reinsurance contract. The bell has developed a crack and the traditional practice of ringing news has ended: the last time it was rung to tell of a lost ship was in 1979 and the last time it was rung to herald the return of an overdue ship was in 1989.

During World War II, the Nazi radio propagandist Lord Haw-Haw asserted that the bell was being rung continuously because of Allied shipping losses during the Battle of the Atlantic. In fact, the bell was rung once, with one ring, during the war, when the Bismarck was sunk.

It tolls when a member of the Royal Family dies and was heard after the deaths of Diana, Princess of Wales, His Royal Highness The Prince Philip, Duke of Edinburgh, Queen Elizabeth The Queen Mother, and Queen Elizabeth II. It is now rung for ceremonial purposes to commemorate disasters such as the 9/11 disaster, the Asian tsunami, and the London Bombings, and is always rung at the start and end of the two minutes silence on Armistice Day. It was rung once after the death of Richard Rogers, architect of the present Lloyd's building.

The bell has hung in four successive Lloyd's Underwriting Rooms:

- The Royal Exchange 1859–1928;
- Lloyd's building in Leadenhall Street 1928–1958;
- Lloyd's first Lime Street headquarters 1958–1986;
- The present Lloyd's building in Lime Street since 1986.

There is also a chair and table at Lloyd's made from the frigate's rudder. The rudder was salvaged on 18 September 1858. This furniture was previously in the Lloyd's writing room and was used by the Chairman of Lloyd's at the annual general meeting of members, but is now kept in the Old Library of the Lloyd's building.

== See also ==
- For a frigate's rigging see sail plan
- Blessing of Burntisland
