= Easton on the Hill =

Village in Northamptonshire, England

Coordinates: 52.6286°N 0.5165°W

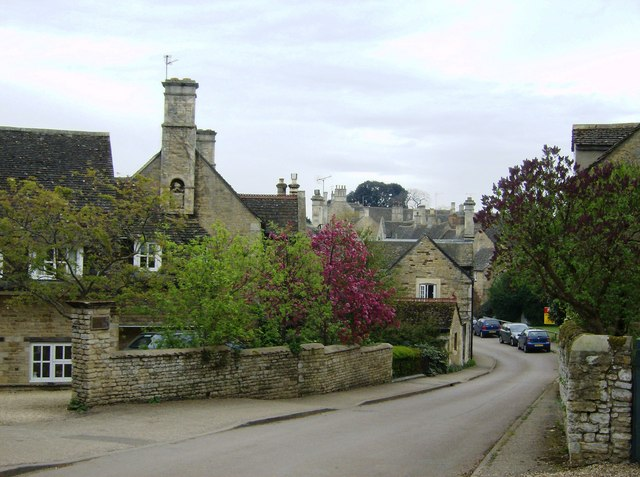
- Easton on the Hill village

- Location within Northamptonshire
- Population: 1,015 (2011)
- OS grid reference: TF0004
- Civil parish: Easton on the Hill
- Unitary authority: North Northamptonshire
- Ceremonial county: Northamptonshire
- Region: East Midlands
- Country: England
- Sovereign state: United Kingdom
- Post town: Stamford
- Postcode district: PE9
- Dialling code: 01780
- Police: Northamptonshire
- Fire: Northamptonshire
- Ambulance: East Midlands
- UK Parliament: Corby and East Northamptonshire

Easton on the Hill is a village and civil parish at the extreme north eastern tip of North Northamptonshire, in the ceremonial county of Northamptonshire, England. The parish had a population at the 2011 census was 1,015. The village, sited on the A43 road, is compact in form, with the older part of the village located north of the High Street. The parish extends from the River Welland in the north to the western end of RAF Wittering. The village is also on the shortest boundary in England with it being in the northernmost part of Northamptonshire between Stamford and Collyweston.

The villages name means 'east farm/settlement' on the hill.

All Saints Church dates from the twelfth century and has been enlarged and altered over the centuries. The church is a Grade I listed building.

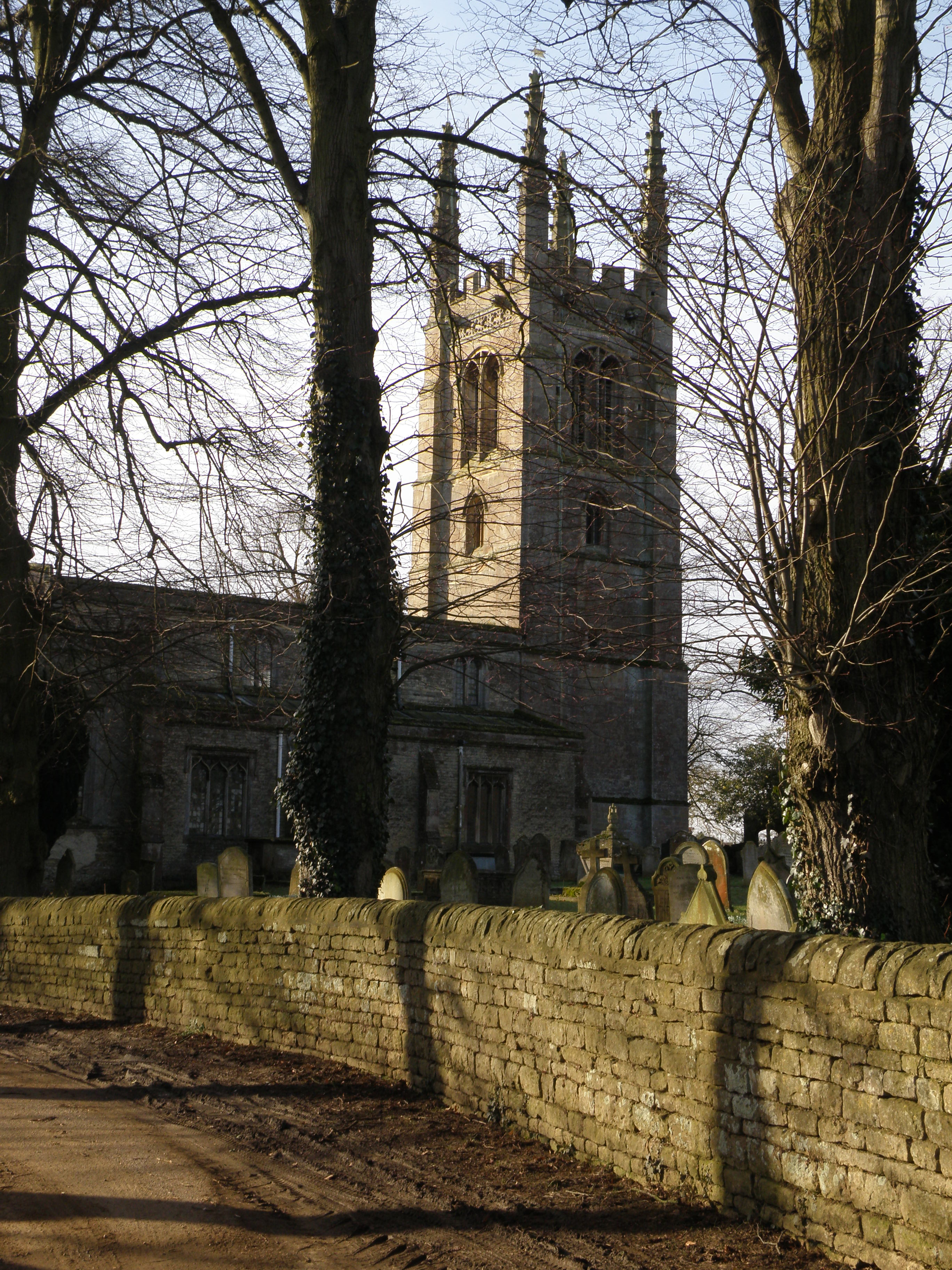
All Saints

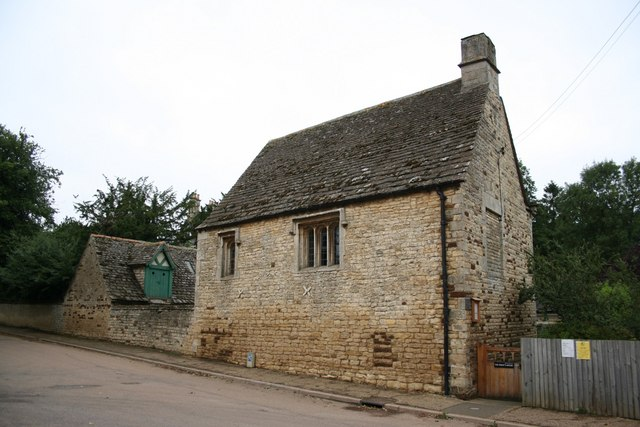
The Priest's House

The village contains the "Priest's House", a late fifteenth-century building restored in 1867 and now owned by the National Trust; it contains a small museum about the area.

The commander of HMS Lutine, Captain Lancelot Skynner, came from Easton, where his father John was the rector for many years. Plaques on the former rectory (now Glebe House but known for a time as Lutine House) and in the church commemorate this and Captain Skynner. (Note: Another Captain Lancelot Skynner, an uncle, who commanded HMS Bideford, also lost his life at sea in an action in the Bay of Biscay in 1760. A further Skynner (William Walker Skynner) also died at sea. He was the navigation officer in HMS Hampshire, which sank after hitting a mine off the north of Scotland while taking Lord Kitchener to Russia in 1916. He is commemorated on the Portsmouth Naval Memorial and the HMS Hampshire Memorial at Winchester Cathedral.) The frigate Lutine sank during a storm in the West Frisian Islands on 9 October 1799, whilst carrying a large shipment of gold. Lloyd's of London has preserved her salvaged bell - the Lutine Bell - which is used for ceremonial purposes at their headquarters in London.

The head office of the Chartered Institute of Procurement & Supply (CIPS) is located at Easton House in the village, close to the church.

Easton on the Hill was in Easton on the Hill Rural District from 1894 to 1935 and Oundle and Thrapston Rural District from 1935 to 1974 and East Northamptonshire non-metropolitan district from 1974 to 2021. The parish has its own parish council and on the county council as part of the Prebendal electoral division. Easton on the Hill is represented in the House of Commons by the Member of Parliament for Corby. At the time of the 2001 census, the parish's population was 956 people.
