= Lancelot Skynner =

English naval officer (1766–1799)

Captain Lancelot Skynner
- Born: 1766
- Died: 9 October 1799 (aged 32–33); At sea, off Vlieland
- Burial place: Vlieland
- Military career
- Allegiance: Kingdom of Great Britain
- Branch: Royal Navy
- Service years: 1779–1799
- Rank: Captain
- Commands: HMS Experiment; HMS Ganges; HMS Beaulieu; HMS Lutine
- Conflicts: American Revolutionary War; French Revolutionary War

Captain Lancelot Skynner (1766 – 9 October 1799) was a Royal Navy officer. He was drowned at the sinking of the infamous HMS Lutine famed for the ship's bell: the Lutine Bell.

== Life ==
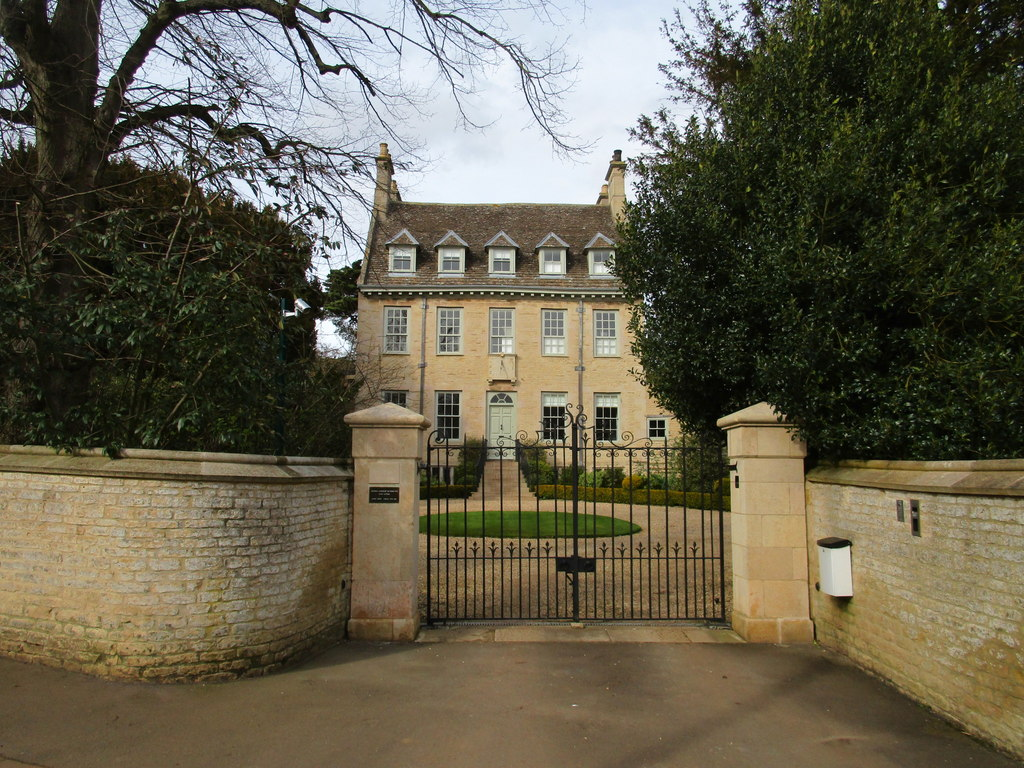
Glebe House, Easton on the Hill

Skynner was born in 1766 at the vicarage (now known as Glebe House) in Easton-on-the-Hill in Northamptonshire the son of the local vicar, Reverend John Skynner (1725-1805), and his wife, Sara Lancaster. He was named after his paternal uncle Captain Lancelot Skynner who had been killed on HMS Bideford on 4 April 1760, fighting a superior force of French frigates.

In 1779 Skynner joined the Royal Navy as a midshipman on the newly launched HMS Brilliant, serving in the English Channel under Captain John Ford. In May 1780 the ship went to the Leeward Islands to protect them from a Spanish fleet. On return to England he transferred still under Ford to HMS Nymphe, a 36-gun frigate newly captured from the French and held at Portsmouth.

He was not promoted to lieutenant until 12 November 1790, then serving under Captain Wyndham Bryer on the 14-gun HMS Cygnet which was based off Jamaica. In February 1793 he was put on HMS Aimable and was briefly on HMS Theseus before joining HMS Boyne under Admiral Sir John Jervis. In April 1794 he transferred to the 18-gun HMS Zebra.

In January 1795 Skynner was given his first ship to command, the 44-gun HMS Experiment which was mainly used as a storage and supply ship in the West Indies. On 16 September he was promoted to post-captain in January 1796 was given command of the 76-gun HMS Ganges. In March he was made captain of HMS Beaulieu and took part in the capture of the island of St Lucia in April/May.

Still on Beaulieu, in August with HMS Mermaid they jointly made a successful attack on the French man-o-war La Vengeance off Basseterre.

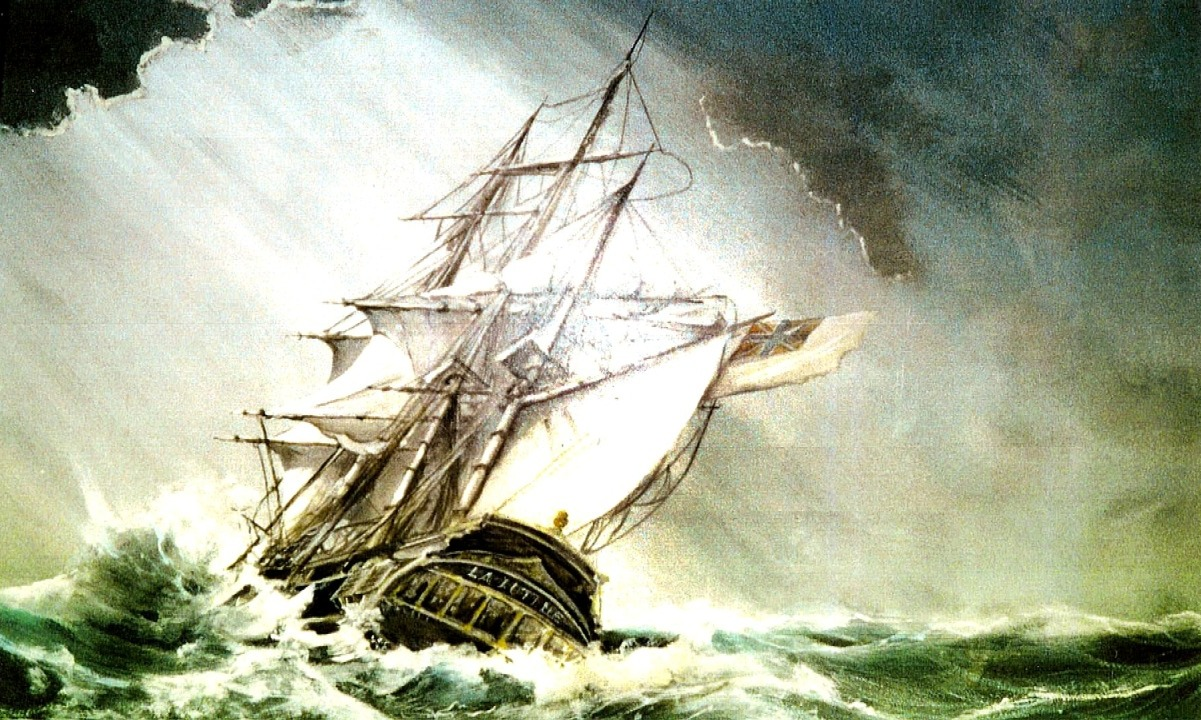
HMS Lutine in the storm

In May 1799 Skynner was given command of HMS Lutine. This 32-gun frigate largely served escort duties in the North Sea. Its fateful voyage related to the conveyance of £1.2 million of gold bullion from England to Germany to support a bank crash there. The ship sank in a storm in the North Sea near Vlieland on 9 October, and Skynner and the crew were drowned. The treasure was never recovered but the ship's bell was found in a search in 1858. Skynner's body washed ashore and was buried in a small cemetery on Vlieland.

== Recognition ==
A plaque to Skynner's memory exists at the entrance to Glebe House in Easton-on-the-Hill.
