= French submarine Marsouin =

Two submarines of the French Navy have been named after the Porpoise, known in France as Marsouin:

- French submarine Marsouin (1924)
- French submarine Marsouin (S632)

== See also ==
- Marsouin (1788 ship)
- Marsouin (disambiguation)
