= HMS Ganges (1782) =

Ship of the line of the Royal Navy

Coordinates: 41°43′N 25°00′W

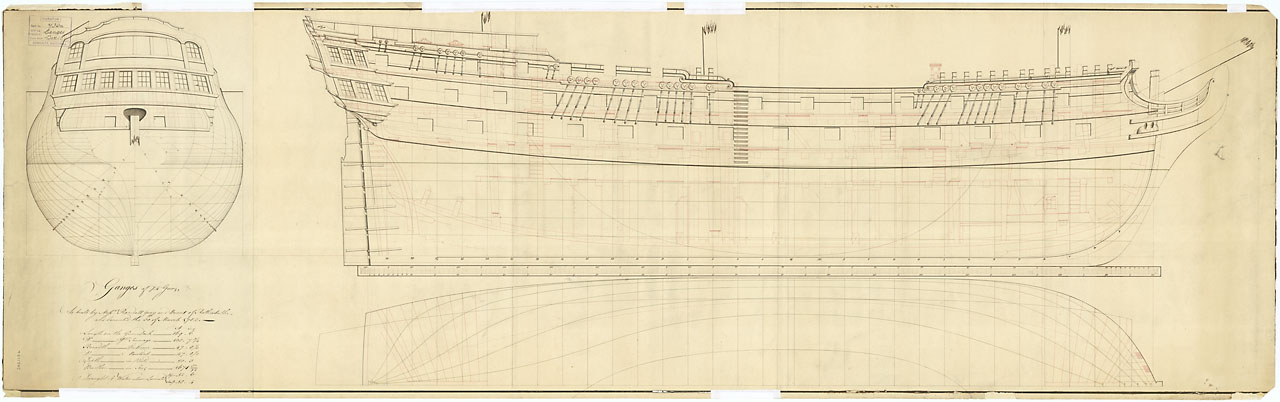
- Ganges

History

Great Britain
- Name: HMS Ganges
- Ordered: 14 July 1779
- Builder: Randall, Rotherhithe
- Laid down: April 1780
- Launched: 30 March 1782
- Fate: Broken up, 1816
- Notes: Participated in: Battle of Cape Spartel; Battle of Copenhagen; Second Battle of Copenhagen

General characteristics
- Class & type: Ganges-class ship of the line
- Tons burthen: 167853/94 or 1679 bm
- Length: 169 ft 6 in (51.7 m) (gundeck)
- Beam: 47 ft 8 1/2 in (14.5 m)
- Depth of hold: 20 ft 3 in (6.2 m)
- Propulsion: Sails
- Sail plan: Full-rigged ship
- Complement: 590 officers and men
- Armament: Gundeck: 28 × 32-pounder guns; Upper gundeck: 28 × 18-pounder guns; QD: 14 × 9-pounder guns; Fc: 4 × 9-pounder guns

HMS Ganges was a 74-gun third-rate ship of the line of the Royal Navy, launched in 1782 at Rotherhithe. She was the first ship of the Navy to bear the name, and was the name ship of her class. She saw active service from 1782 to 1811, in Europe and the West Indies.

== Origins ==
The British East India Company had Randall build a 74-gun ship under the name Bengal. They then presented (donated) her to the Royal Navy, which renamed her HMS Ganges.

The Royal Navy commissioned Ganges in February 1782 under the command of Captain Charles Fielding. She was paid-off in March, but immediately recommissioned under Captain J. Lutterell as a guardship at Portsmouth. Between 1784 and 1787, she was under the command of Captain Sir Roger Curtis. In October 1787 she became the flagship of Rear-Admiral Sir Francis Drake. She was recommissioned in December 1790 under Captain Anthony Molloy.

== French Revolutionary Wars ==
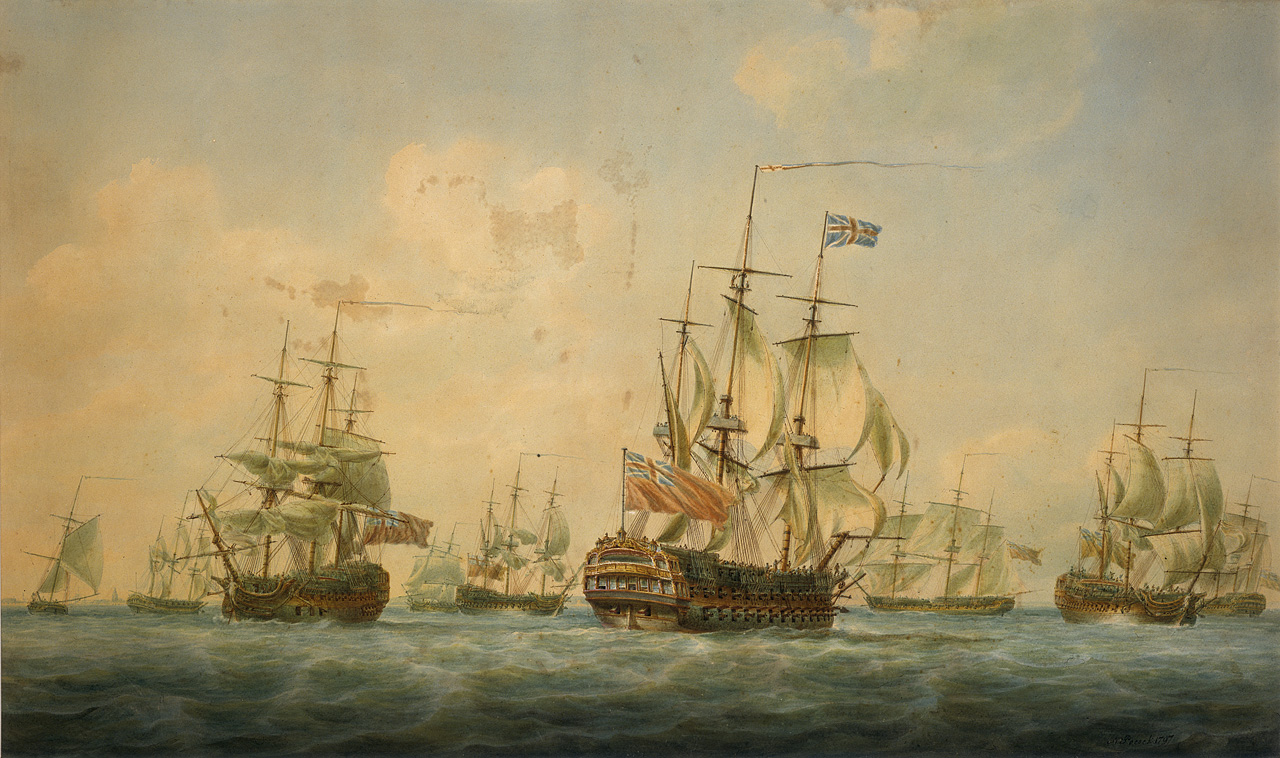
Ganges (fourth from right) in a 1797 Nicholas Pocock painting

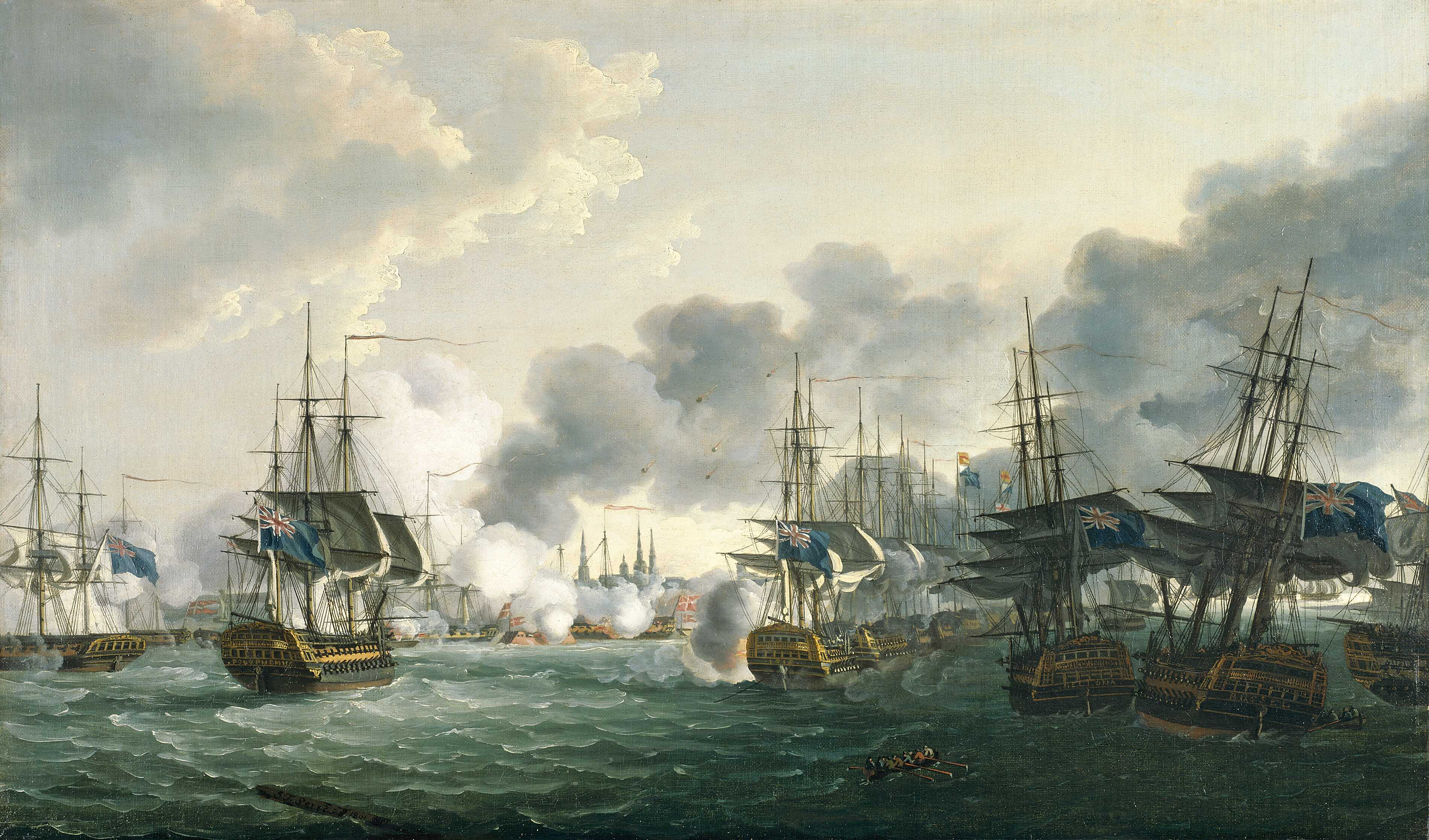
Ganges at Copenhagen, 1801

In 1794, whilst under the command of Captain William Truscott, she and Montagu captured the French corvette Jacobine. Jacobin was armed with twenty-four 12-pounder guns, and had a crew of 220 men; she was nine days out of Brest and had taken nothing. The Royal Navy took Jacobin into service as HMS Matilda.

Ganges was part of the squadron commanded by Admiral John Gell, which escorted a Spanish ship they had captured from the French back to Portsmouth. The ownership of the ship was a matter of some debate and was not settled until 4 February 1795, when the value of the cargo was put at £935,000. At this time all the crew, captains, officers and admirals received a share of the prize money, Admiral Hood taking away £50,000. Besides Ganges, the ships that conveyed the Spanish prize to Portsmouth were St George, Egmont, Edgar and Phaeton.

Ganges shared in the prize money from the capture of the French supply ship Marsouin by Beaulieu on 11 March 1796. Ganges was under the command of Captain Thomas Fremantle at the Battle of Copenhagen. She had on board a contingent of soldiers from the 49th Foot, commanded by Isaac Brock. Their mission was to storm the forts at Copenhagen, but the outcome of the naval battle made the assault unnecessary.

== Napoleonic Wars ==
Ganges was one of six British warships that shared in the capture on 23 August 1807 of the Danish vessel Speculation.

Ganges was also present at the Second Battle of Copenhagen. She bore the flag of Commodore Richard Goodwin Keats, and was commanded by Captain Peter Halkett. During the battle Keats placed a portrait of Admiral Nelson on the mizzen mast where it was said to have encouraged officers and men alike despite being covered in the blood and brains of an unfortunate seaman.

In September 1810, two row-boat luggers, one from Ruby, under the command of Lieutenant Robert Streatfield, and one from Ganges, under the command Lieutenants Stackpole, captured two Danish armed vessels off Lessoe. There were no British casualties.

== Fate ==
She was commissioned as a prison ship on 12 December 1811 for holding prisoners of war. Then in 1814 she was transferred to the Transport Board. Ganges was broken up at Plymouth in 1816.
