= Invasion of Guadeloupe (1794) =

1794 battle in the French West Indies

- Part of the War of the First Coalition
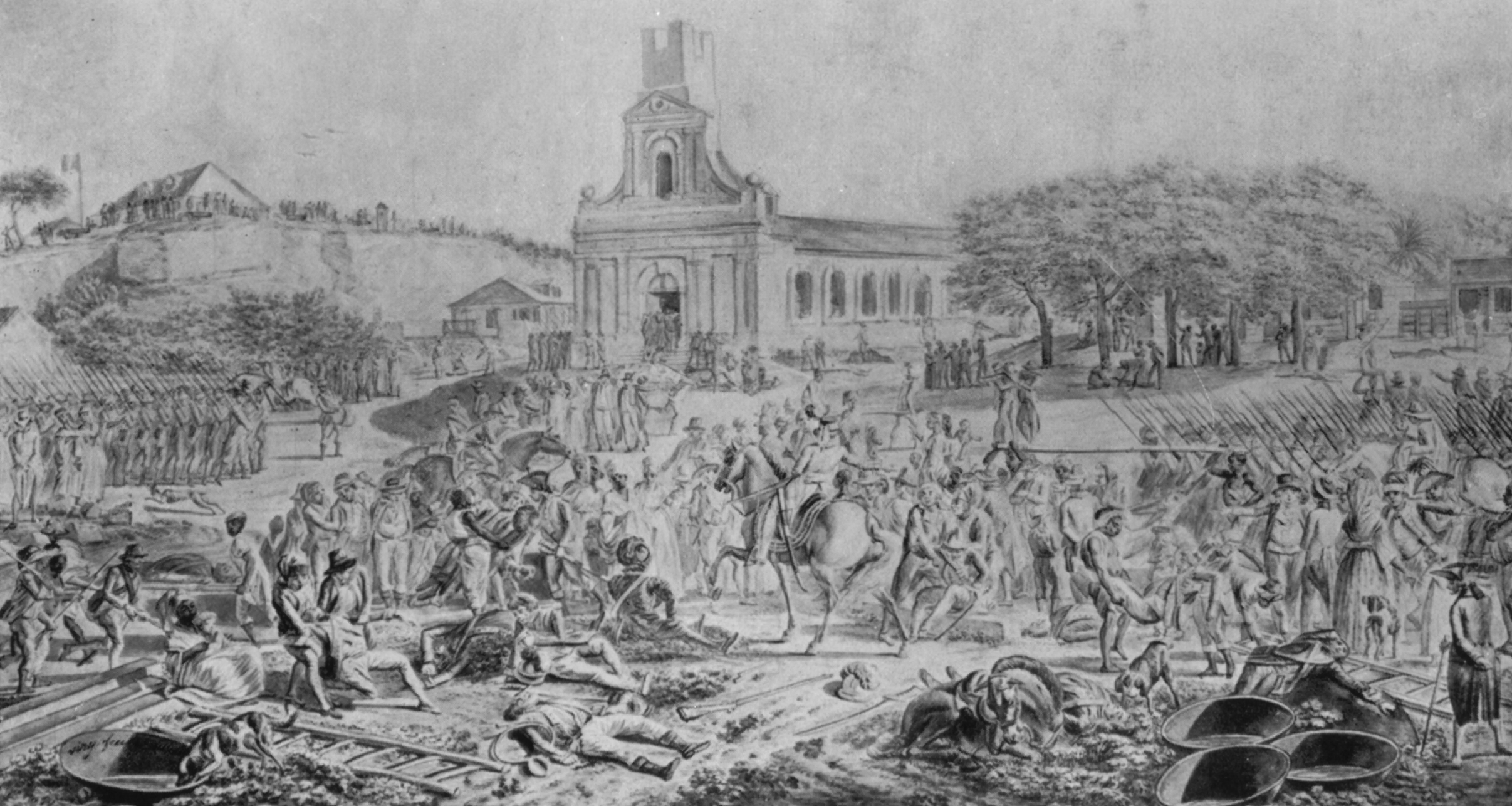
- Contemporary drawing of the capitulation of British troops in Guadeloupe
Date	11 April 1794 – 10 December 1794
Location	Guadeloupe
Result	French victory

Belligerents
Great Britain	France

Commanders and leaders
Charles Grey; John Jervis	Victor Collot; Victor Hugues

The invasion of Guadeloupe was a British attempt in 1794 to take and hold the island of Guadeloupe in the French West Indies during the French Revolutionary Wars. The British had negotiated with the French planters, Ignace-Joseph-Philippe de Perpignan and Louis de Curt, who wished to gain British protection, as France's National Convention was passing a law abolishing slavery on 4 February 1794. The Whitehall Accord was signed on 19 February 1793, prior to the British capture of Martinique in the Battle of Martinique (1794).

Troops led by General Charles Grey landed in Guadeloupe on 11 April 1794, assisted by a fleet led by Admiral Sir John Jervis. On 24 April French general Georges Henri Victor Collot surrendered the last stronghold at Basse-Terre, leaving the island in the hands of the British and their French Royalist allies. On 4 June a French fleet landed troops under the command of Victor Hugues who, with the assistance of French Republican locals, helped by the effect of yellow fever and other tropical diseases on the British forces, regained full control of the island by 10 December 1794. Hugues allowed the British to withdraw but ordered the French Royalists who had fought with them, consisting of between 400 and 500 men and women, to be summarily executed by firing squad.

== Troops and people involved ==
- 6th Regiment of Foot
- 43rd Regiment of Foot
- Major-General Thomas Dundas (appointed governor of Guadeloupe, but died of yellow fever 3 June 1794)
