= Marsouin (1788 ship) =

History

France
- Name: Marsouin
- Namesake: Porpoise
- Builder: Bayonne
- Laid down: 1786 or 1787
- Launched: 1787 or 1788
- Completed: 1788
- Captured: March 1795

Great Britain
- Name: HMS Marsouin
- Acquired: March 1795 by capture
- Commissioned: Never commissioned
- Fate: Listed until 1799

General characteristics
- Displacement: 400 tons (French; unladen)
- Tons burthen: 325 (bm)
- Length: 36.38 m (119.4 ft) (overall); 33.95 m (111.4 ft)
- Beam: 9.10 m (29.9 ft)
- Depth of hold: 4.55 m (14.9 ft)
- Propulsion: Sails
- Complement: 73-102 (French store ship)
- Armament: French store ship: 22 × 8-pounder guns + 4 swivel guns; British sloop: 16 guns

Marsouin was a gabarre, the name-ship of her three-vessel class, built to a design by Raymond-Antoine Haran, and launched in 1787 or 1788 at Bayonne. She carried troops, supplies, invalids, etc., across the Atlantic to the Caribbean or back until the British captured her in 1795. Though the Royal Navy nominally took her into service, she was never actually commissioned, and she disappeared from the lists in 1799.

== Service ==
On 6 April 1788 she sailed from Bayonne for Cochinchina while under the command of Major de vaisseau the marquis de Grasse-Briançon. She arrived back at Brest on 1 August 1789. Thereafter she spent her time sailing between France and the West Indies.

In May 1791 she was under the command of sous-lieutenant de vaisseau d'Urvoy de Portzamparc, ferrying troops from Martinique back to Lorient. From 4 February to 14 December 1792, Marsouin was under the command of lieutenant de port Guillaume-Marie Lemarant-Boissauveur. Under his command she transported provisions from Brest to Cap-Français, via Lisbon, and invalids from Saint-Domingue to Lorient. She then returned to Brest. Her commander in January 1793 was lieutenant de vaisseau Laterre. Then between 27 August and 28 September it was lieutenant de vaisseau Bourdé. During the year she transported troops and then escorted a convoy from Brest to the roads of the Île d'Aix.

== Capture and fate ==
In 1795 Marsouin, under the command of enseigne de vaisseau non-entretenu Gois, was at Basse-Terre when she was ordered to sea to attempt to intercept a British privateer that was preying on French commerce. Unfortunately, on 11 March 1795, the day after she left Guadeloupe, Marsouin encountered the British frigate HMS Beaulieu, which was under the command of Captain Lancelot Skynner. Marsouin attempted to evade but Beaulieu fired on her. After Marsouin had suffered numerous dead and wounded and substantial damage to her masts and rigging, Gois, who had himself been wounded, struck. The subsequent court martial acquitted him of the loss of his vessel. Ganges shared in the prize money for the capture.

The British took Marsouin into the Royal Navy as HMS Marsouin, but never commissioned her. She was listed until 1799.
