= HMS Bideford (1756) =

Bideford-class Royal Navy frigate

History

Great Britain
- Name: HMS Bideford
- Ordered: 30 October 1754
- Builder: Adam Hayes, Deptford Dockyard
- Laid down: 9 January 1755
- Launched: 6 July 1758 at Buckler's Hard
- Completed: 2 March 1756 at Deptford Dockyard
- Commissioned: February 1756
- In service: 1756–1761
- Fate: Wrecked off North Norfolk, December 1761

General characteristics
- Class & type: 20-gun Bideford-class sixth-rate frigate
- Tons burthen: 402 85/94 bm
- Length: 105 ft 0 in (32.0 m) (gun deck); 85 ft 7 in (26.1 m) (keel)
- Beam: 29 ft 9 in (9.1 m)
- Depth of hold: 9 ft 2 in (2.8 m)
- Sail plan: Full-rigged ship
- Complement: 160
- Armament: 20 × 9-pounder guns

HMS Bideford was a 20-gun sixth-rate frigate of the Royal Navy that saw service during the early part of the Seven Years' War between Britain and France. Built to a design copied from Le Tygre, a French vessel captured in 1747, she was launched in 1757 as a privateer-hunter in the English Channel and Bay of Biscay. Active for four years, she secured seven victories at sea over French vessels. She was wrecked on Haisborough Sands off North Norfolk on 31 December 1761.

== Service history ==
HMS Bideford was designed by Sir Thomas Slade and built by Adam Hayes at Deptford Dockyard with Captain Robert Digby as Commander, with a crew of 160 men. The ship was based on the south English coast. In November 1756 command passed to Francis Samuel Drake.

In June 1757 command passed to Captain Samuel Hood (father of the infamous Captain Samuel Hood) and she joined the fleet of Admiral Hawke and began a period of intense action.

- 30 July 1757 - attacked and captured the French schooner "La Victoire".
- 30 September 1757 - attacked and captured the French privateer "Romieu"

In February 1758 command passed from Hood to Captain Lancelot Skynner.

- 26 August 1758 - attacked and captured the French privateer "Le Printemps"
- 4 April 1760 - with HMS Flamborough attacked two superior French ships, each of 32-guns: "La Malicieuse" and "L'Opale", unfortunately at the loss of Skynner's life. Lt Knollis then took command but was also killed. In total 10 men were killed and 24 wounded on Bideford. The British ships were forced to retreat.

After repairs Bideford was put under command of Captain William Howe in July 1760.

- 14 March 1761 - attacked and captured the French sloop "Le Chamillard"
- 14 April 1761 - attacked and captured the French privateer "L'Augustine"
- 3 May 1761 - attacked and captured the French privateer "Le Marquise de Beringhen"

In September 1761 command passed from Howe to Captain Thomas Gordon]

The ship was wrecked on the notorious Haisborough Sands off the Norfolk coast on December 31, 1761. The captain and much of the crew were drowned.
