= Battle of Martinique (1794) =

1794 invasion of the War of the First Coalition

- Part of the War of the First Coalition
- British forces capturing Fort Saint Louis on 20 March 1794 during the invasion
Date	5 February – 24 March 1794
Location	Martinique 14°40′N 61°0′W
Result	British victory
Territorial changes	British occupation of Martinique

Belligerents
Great Britain	French Republic

Commanders and leaders
John Jervis; Charles Grey	Donatien de Rochambeau (surrendered)

Strength
6,000 personnel 3 ships of the line 5 Frigates	900 regulars and militia
- Location within the Caribbean Battle of Martinique (1794) (South America)

The Battle of Martinique was a successful British invasion of the French colony of Martinique in the West Indies during the French Revolutionary Wars. They continued to occupy the island until 1802, when the Treaty of Amiens restored it to French control.

== Background ==
Prior to the invasion, war had broken out between the French Republic and Great Britain. The British government was contacted by French planter Louis-François Dubuc, who wished to place Martinique under British protection as the Republic's National Constituent Assembly was about to pass legislation which would abolish slavery in the French colonial empire; the legislation was passed the day before the British invasion of Martinique commenced. Fourteen days later, the British signed the Whitehall Accord on 9 February with counter-revolutionary French planters, which allowed them to keep their chattel property.

== Invasion ==
On 5 February, a British fleet under the command of Royal Navy Admiral Sir John Jervis landed troops under the command of Sir Charles Grey on the island, which proceeded to capture the island from the Republicans in concert with French planters.

By 20 March, only Fort Bourbon and Fort Royal remained under Republican control. Jervis ordered the fourth-rate ship of the line HMS Asia, and the sloop, HMS Zebra to capture Fort Saint Louis. HMS Asia was unable to get close to the fort and Zebra went in alone, with her captain, Richard Faulknor. Despite facing heavy Republican artillery fire, Faulknor ran Zebra close under the walls. He and his ship's company then used Zebra's boats to land. The British stormed the fort and captured it. Zebra lost only her pilot killed and four men wounded. Meanwhile, the remainder of the British fleet captured Fort Royal and two days later Fort Bourbon capitulated.

== Aftermath ==
The governor of Martinique, Donatien de Rochambeau, surrendered to Grey. The British then occupied Martinique until the Treaty of Amiens returned the island to the French in 1802.
