= Faulknor family =

The Faulknor family was an English family from Northamptonshire, of which several generations served as officers in the Royal Navy.

== Samuel Faulknor (I) ==
Samuel Faulknor (d. 5 October 1744) was the son of William Faulknor. He commanded the 100-gun ship Britannia in 1736, and also the 100-gun Royal Sovereign before being appointed commander of the Victory, flagship of Admiral Sir John Norris, in early 1741. On 28 July 1744 Victory sailed with a fleet of British and Dutch ships from St. Helen's for Lisbon. During the voyage they captured six French ships. On 3 October the fleet was dispersed in a gale, and on the next night Victory was lost with her entire crew. It was believed that Victory struck the Casquets rocks off Alderney, but in 2009 a wreck identified as Victory was found by Odyssey Marine Exploration nearly 62 miles (100 km) from where the ship was supposed to have sunk.

== Robert Faulknor the elder ==
Robert Faulknor the elder (d. 9 May 1769) was also the son of Samuel Faulknor. Robert entered the Navy while still a boy, and in 1741, aged only 15, served during the Siege of Cartagena de Indias. He was seriously wounded there—sixteen splinters of bone were taken from his ankle—but was promoted to lieutenant soon afterwards. He later served in the Battle of Minorca on 20 May 1756, and was a witness at Admiral Byng's subsequent court-martial. Soon after Faulknor was promoted to the rank of commander in a sloop-of-war, and in 1757, was advanced to post-rank, and commanded the 68-gun ship Marlborough, for a short time. In August 1761 Faulknor was in command of the seventy-four Bellona, and sailing in company with the frigate Brilliant (36) off Vigo, northern Spain, when they engaged the French seventy-four Courageux, and the 36-gun frigates Malicicuse and Ermine. Bellona fought and captured Courageux in a fierce action lasting just 55 minutes, while Brilliant engaged the frigates. Faulknor was appointed to command the Kent in 1763. In poor health after a fall from a horse whilst hunting, he then lived in Bath, and afterwards in Dijon, France, where he died on 9 May 1769.

== Robert Faulknor the younger ==
Robert Faulknor the younger (1763–1795) was the son of Robert Faulknor the elder. He entered the Navy in 1777 and served under William Cornwallis in several ships during the American War, receiving promotion to lieutenant in 1780. After several periods on half-pay he was appointed commander of the 16-gun sloop Zebra on the outbreak of the French Revolutionary War in 1793. After an attack on Fort Royal, Martinique, Faulknor was made post and given command of the 28-gun frigate Undaunted. He then took part in the invasion of Guadeloupe. Faulknor was in command of the frigate Blanche when she captured the French frigate Pique on 6 January 1795. Faulknor was killed during the action.

== Jonathan Faulknor the younger ==
Jonathan Faulknor the younger was the son of Jonathan Faulknor the elder. In 1789 he married Rebecca, daughter of Lieutenant-General Horatio Spry (1730–1811) of the Cornish Spry family. He died in 1809 with the rank of rear-admiral of the red. He was the father of Commander Jonathan Faulknor, R.N., and Lieutenant Augustus Spry Faulknor, and the grandfather of Colonel Jonathan Augustus Spry Faulknor.

== Family tree ==
Captain; William Faulknor (d. 1725)
Captain; Samuel Faulknor (d. 1744)
Captain; Samuel Faulknor (d. 1760)	Captain; Robert Faulknor the elder (1726–1769)	Admiral; Jonathan Faulknor (d. 1795)
Captain; Robert Faulknor the younger (1763–1795)	Rear Admiral; Jonathan Faulknor the younger (d. 1809)
Commander; Jonathan Faulknor	Lieutenant; Augustus Spry Faulknor
