= Admiral Thompson =

Admiral Thompson may refer to:

- Alan S. Thompson (born 1954), U.S. Navy vice admiral
- Sir Charles Thompson, 1st Baronet (c. 1740–1799), British Royal Navy vice admiral
- Donald C. Thompson (admiral) (born 1930), US. Coast Guard vice admiral
- Norborne Thompson (c. 1769–1844), British Royal Navy vice admiral
- Richard Thompson (Royal Navy officer) (born 1966), British Royal Navy vice admiral
- Sir Thomas Thompson, 1st Baronet (1766–1828), British Royal Navy vice admiral
- William Thompson (admiral) (1922–2018), U.S. Navy rear admiral

== See also ==
- Rolf Thomsen (1915–2003), German Navy flotilla admiral
- Evelyn Thomson (1884–1941), British Royal Navy vice admiral
