= Fame (1786 ship) =

History

Great Britain
- Name: Fame
- Builder: India
- Launched: 1786, or 1787
- Fate: Burned 23 April 1823
- Notes: Teak-built

General characteristics
- Tons burthen: 306, or 370, or 377, or 37058/94, or 3844/94 (by calc.), or 396, or 420 (bm)
- Length: 103 ft 3 in (31.5 m)
- Beam: 29 ft 0 in (8.8 m)
- Propulsion: Sail
- Complement: 1796:40; 1798:40; 1800:25; 1803:45; 1807:30
- Armament: 1795:8 × 6-pounder guns; 1796:20 × 9&6-pounder cannons; 1798:18 × 6&9-pounder cannons; 1800:18 × 9-pounder cannons; 1803:20 × 6&9&18-pounder cannons; 1807:16 × 9&6-pounder guns + 2 × 18-pounder carronades
- Notes: Three decks; built of teak

Fame was launched in India in 1786. She was sold to Portuguese owners. A French privateer captured but the Royal Navy recaptured her in 1794. She then became a West Indiaman, sailing from Liverpool. Between 1796 and 1804 she made three voyages as a slave ship in the triangular trade in enslaved people. She then returned to the West Indies trade. From 1818 on she was a whaler in the Greenland whale fishery, sailing from Whitby and then Hull. She burnt in 1823 while outward bound on a whaling voyage.

== Career ==
=== Origins ===
Fame was built in India in 1786, or 1787. At some point her owners sold her to Portuguese owners. The French privateer Marseilles captured her but then HMS Blanche recaptured her. She was condemned at Roseau, Dominica on 18 June 1794, and duty on her was paid at Liverpool on 9 February 1795.

Fame first appeared in Lloyd's Register (LR) in 1795. It gave her origins as the East Indies and made no mention of her being a prize. She then became a West Indiaman.

Year	Master	Owner	Trade	Source & notes
1795	T.Lorney	Neilsen & Co.	Liverpool–Dominica; Liverpool–Africa	LR; repaired 1794
1796	T.Lorney	Neilsen & Co.	Liverpool–Dominica; Liverpool–Africa	LR; repaired 1794
1797	T.Lorney	Neilsen & Co.	Liverpool–Dominivc; Liverpool–Africa	LR

=== Slave ship (1796–1804) ===
In 1796 Fame sailed on the first of three voyages transporting enslaved people.

1st voyage transporting enslaved people (1796–1797): Captain Robert Bennett acquired a letter of marque on 20 October 1796. He sailed from Liverpool on 26 October, bound for Bonny Island. In 1796, 103 vessels sailed from English ports, bound for Africa and the trade in enslaved people; 94 of these vessels sailed from Liverpool.

On 25 November, as she sailed to acquire captives, Fame recaptured Bernard. Bernard had been sailing from Demerara to Bremen with a cargo of coffee and cotton for Messrs Neilsen and Heathcote when a French frigate and a brig had captured her. After Fame recaptured Bernard, Bernard sailed to Swansea. Fame stopped at Barbados, and arrived at Kingston, Jamaica, on 21 June 1797 with 480 captives. She sailed from Kingston on 26 July and arrived back at Liverpool on 18 October. She had left Liverpool with 42 crew members and she suffered five crew deaths on her voyage.

Mercantile voyage (1798–1799): Captain Thomas Atkinson acquired a letter of marque on 5 March 1798. He sailed Fame to Grenada via Madeira. On 29 March 1799 LL reported that Fame, Atkinson, master, had been sailing from Demerara to Liverpool when she had put into St Vincents.

2nd voyage transporting enslaved people (1800–1802): Captain Owen Pritchard acquired a letter of marque on 21 July 1800. He sailed from Liverpool on 8 August. In 1800, 133 vessels sailed from English ports, bound for Africa and the trade in enslaved people; 122 of these vessels sailed from Liverpool.

Fame acquired captives at Calabar. Captain Pritchard died on 14 February 1801. Captain John Campbell replaced Pritchard. Fame arrived at Trinidad on 12 October. She arrived back at Liverpool on 18 January 1802. She had left Liverpool with 42 crew members and suffered 12 crew deaths during the voyage.

3rd voyage transporting enslaved people (1803–1804): Captain Richard Davidson acquired a letter of marque on 8 October 1803. He sailed from Liverpool on 16 November 1803. In 1803, 99 vessels sailed from English ports, bound for Africa and the trade in enslaved people; 83 of these vessels sailed from Liverpool.

Fame acquired captives slaves at Rio Pongas, Cape Grand Mount, and Gallinhas. Fame then arrived at Demerara on 14 April 1804. She had embarked 338 captives and she landed 315. When she arrived at Demerara she brought news that Active, Dalrymple, master, and Prudence, Darby (D'Arcy), master, had been captured on the Windward Coast. Fame arrived back at Liverpool on 21 September 1804. She had left Liverpool with 49 crew members and had suffered seven crew deaths on the voyage.

Year	Master	Owner	Trade	Source & notes
1803	Pritchard; J.Campbell	Neilson; Rigg & co.	Liverpool–Africa	LR; repairs 1795
1804	J.Campbell	Rigg & Co.	Liverpool–Africa	LR; repairs 1795
1805	J.Campbell	Rigg & Co.	Liverpool–Africa	LR; repairs 1795
1806	J.Campbell; P. Williams	Rigg & Co. Neilsen & Co.	Liverpool–Africa	LR; repairs 1795

=== West Indiaman ===
Fame returned to the West Indies trade. (Note: Lloyd's Listreported that Fame, Williams. master, was one of the three vessels that a French naval squadron had captured on 7 December 1805 at 30°N 37°W. Fame had been sailing from Bristol to Jamaica. The Register of Shipping carried the annotation "Captured" by Fame's name. However, the Fame that was captured was almost certainly a different vessel.)

In January 1806 Fame sailed for Demerara but had to put back to Liverpool, having suffered damage in a gale. In her trade with Demerara Fame returned with sugar, cotton, and coffee.

On 5 September 1807 Captain Phillip Williams acquired a letter of marque.

Year	Master	Owner	Trade	Source & notes
1807	P.Williams	Notton & Co. Neilson & Co.	Liverpool–Demerara	LR; repairs 1795
1810	Williams	Neilson & Co.	Liverpool–Demerara	LR
1811	Williams	Neilson & Co.	Liverpool–Demerara	LR
1812	Williams	Davis & Co.	Liverpool–Demerara	LR
1814	P.Williams; J.Gilmour; M.Philau	Davison & Co.	Liverpool–Brazils	LR
1815	M.Pilau; C.H.Byrne	Davison & Co.	Liverpool–Antigua	LR
1816	C.H.Byrne; G.Huston	Davison & Co.	London–Archangel	LR
1818	G.Hutton; W.Scorsbie	Hamilton & Co.	Liverpool–Brazils	LR

=== Northern Whale Fishery ===
Fame was registered at Whitby in January 1818. One source states that Scoresby (Snr) purchased her in 1817 as a French prize. Another source declares her a Portuguese prize. She appeared in the Register of Shipping in 1818 with origin India, but no date of building, or mention of her being a prize.

For her first voyage to the Northern Whale Fisheries she sailed from Liverpool on 2 April 1818 and returned to Whitby on 18 August. From 1821 on she sailed from Hull. The data in the table is from Coltish:

Year	Master	Ground	Whales	Tuns of whale oil
1818	Scoresby Jr.	Greenland (Gr)	8	122
1819	Dunbar	Gr	16	123
1820	Scoresby		10	
1821	Scoresby	Gr	9	143
1822	Scoresby	Gr	6	70
1823	Scoresby Sr	Gr	0	0

On the 1821 whaling voyage Fame carried Congreve rockets. Sir William Congreve equipped her with rockets at his own expense to test their utility in whaling hunting. The Master General of Ordnance and the First Lord of the Admiralty had Lieutenant Colquhoun and two Marine artillerymen accompany the rockets as observers. Captain Scoresby wrote a letter from the Greenland fishery in June reporting that the rockets had been a great success. Subsequent reports made clear that the rockets were fired from about 40 yards and were highly effective in killing whales that had already been conventionally harpooned. In December Lieutenant Colquhoun demonstrated the use of the rockets at Annapolis, Maryland. A newspaper story gave a detailed account of the experiments he performed.

On 27 August 1822, a storm dismasted Dundee in the Greenland whale fishery and trapped her in ice. Fame, Scoresby, Snr., pulled Dundee out and stayed with her until Dundee had rigged jury masts and was sufficiently equipped and supplied to reach Liverpool.

William Scoresby, Jr William Scoresby Sr, registered Fame at Hull in 1823 after having her almost rebuilt.

== Fate ==
Fame burned at Dear Sound (58°58′00″N 2°48′15″W), in Orkney, on 23 April 1823. Some of the crew arrived at Lieth on 27 April. (Note: One source attributes to Fame the fate of a different Fame.)

Captain Scoresby Sr, retired after 37 years in the Arctic.
