= Action of 19 December 1796 =

Naval engagement of the French Revolutionary Wars

- Part of the French Revolutionary Wars
Date	19–20 December 1796
Location	off Cartagena, Murcia, Spain
Result	Inconclusive

Belligerents
Great Britain	Spain

Commanders and leaders
Commodore Horatio Nelson	Captain Don Jacobo Stuart

Strength
Frigates HMS Minerve and HMS Blanche	Frigates Sabina and Ceres. Later supported by frigates Matilde, Perla and first rate Principe de Asturias

Casualties and losses
7 killed 44 wounded	19 killed 58 wounded

The action of 19 December 1796 was a minor naval engagement of the French Revolutionary Wars, fought in the last stages of the Mediterranean campaign between two British Royal Navy frigates and two Spanish Navy frigates off the coast of Murcia. The British squadron was the last remaining British naval force in the Mediterranean, sent to transport the British garrison of Elba to safety under the command of Commodore Horatio Nelson. The Spanish under Commodore Don Jacobo Stuart were the vanguard of a much larger squadron. One Spanish frigate was captured and another damaged before Spanish reinforcements drove the British off and recaptured the lost ship.

The action came just two months after the Spanish declaration of war. Having previously been an ally of Britain, Spain had been forced to sign a peace treaty with the French Republic in August 1795 and subsequently to declare war on Britain under the terms of the Treaty of San Ildefonso on 5 October 1796. Outnumbered and isolated, the British Mediterranean Fleet under Vice-Admiral Sir John Jervis had been forced to withdraw to Lisbon and was enacting a blockade of the Spanish naval base at Cádiz. By December 1796 the only remaining British forces in the Mediterranean were the garrison on the island of Elba, seized from the Grand Duchy of Tuscany by the British earlier in the year after the French occupation of Tuscany. Jervis determined to evacuate the island and sent Nelson with the frigates HMS Minerve and HMS Blanche to retrieve the garrison.

During his passage to Elba, Nelson's squadron encountered Stuart's Spanish frigates off Murcia on 19 December and attacked, Nelson taking Minerve against Sabina and sending Blanche to attack Ceres. For three hours the frigates fought, Nelson's Minerve shattering the Spanish ship and inflicting heavy casualties. Eventually Sabina surrendered as Blanche attacked and drove off Ceres. As Blanche pursued, a larger Spanish squadron, including two more frigates and the huge 112-gun first rate ship of the line Principe de Asturias appeared. Recognising the superiority of his opponents, Nelson briefly engaged the leading frigate Matilde, before abandoning Sabina and sailing away to the east. The captured Spanish ship was swiftly recaptured. Nelson was able to reach Elba and remove the garrison without further engagements, reconnoitering French and Spanish naval bases on his route back to Gibraltar, returning to Jervis' fleet immediately before the Battle of Cape St. Vincent, at which he played a key part in the decisive defeat of the main Spanish fleet.

== Background ==
Great Britain and Spain had become reluctant allies in 1793, despite a history of antagonism in the Mediterranean, against the newly formed French Republic in the War of the First Coalition. The Spanish refused to allow British officers to command Spanish forces, and tensions between the fleets were still high following the 1790 Nootka Crisis. While supposedly co-operating at the Siege of Toulon, the Spanish Admiral Juan de Lángara engaged in such a heated argument with his British counterpart Vice-Admiral Lord Hood over strategy that he threatened to open fire on the British flagship HMS Victory, while the disastrous failure of the allied defense of the city was marked by accusations that Spanish forces had deliberately sabotaged a combined operation to destroy the French Mediterranean Fleet.

During 1794 and 1795 the Spanish suffered a series of defeats in the War of the Pyrenees, and in August 1795 they signed a peace treaty with France, removing their forces from the Mediterranean campaign. Inconclusive fighting that year between British and French fleets at the Battle of Genoa and the Battle of the Hyères Islands led to a stalemate, the French under blockade at Toulon sending raiding squadrons against British trade. During 1796 the Italian campaigns of Napoleon Bonaparte eliminated Britain's Italian allies, while diplomatic negotiations brought Spain into an alliance with France in August, through the Treaty of San Ildefonso. On 5 October Spain declared war on Britain and a large Spanish fleet united with the French at Toulon.

Under threat from this much larger combined force, Vice-Admiral Sir John Jervis ordered the British Mediterranean Fleet to withdraw from the Mediterranean. Gibraltar, at the mouth of the sea, was too small to support a fleet and so Jervis withdrew all the way to the Tagus at Lisbon. During the summer and early autumn of 1796 French forces had seized Leghorn and invaded and recaptured Corsica, denying the British safe anchorages in the Western Mediterranean. As a temporary base Jervis ordered the seizure of the Tuscan island of Elba, to which all of the remaining British personnel in the Mediterranean withdrew. Ashe pulled his main fleet to the Tagus, Jervis ordered Commodore Horatio Nelson of HMS Captain to leave his ship and take a small frigate squadron to Elba and collect the remaining personnel as the final evacuation of the Mediterranean.

== Action ==
Nelson's force comprised HMS Minerve and HMS Blanche. Minerve was a 38-gun former French ship captured at the action of 24 June 1795, commanded by Captain George Cockburn, the crew augmented by a detachment from the 18th Regiment of Foot. Blanche was a 32-gun 12-pounder ship commanded by Captain D'Arcy Preston, which had seen extensive action in the West Indies in the early years of the war. Preston had recently replaced Captain Charles Sawyer, known to his crew as "that Man fucking Bugger Sawyer", who had been court-martialed and dismissed from his command for a series of homosexual assaults on young midshipmen and sailors. As Jervis sailed for Lisbon from Gibraltar with his fleet on 16 December, Nelson's small squadron departed in the opposite direction, towards Elba.

At 22:00 on 19 December Nelson's squadron was off the coast of Murcia off Cartagena when he sighted a squadron of two Spanish frigates, the 40-gun Sabina and 34-gun Ceres. This squadron was commanded by Captain Don Jacobo Stuart, "reputed the best officer in Spain." Nelson ordered Blanche to engage Ceres and took Minerve against Sabina, coming alongside at 22:40. Reportedly, as he came up, Nelson hailed the Spanish captain and was told "this is a Spanish frigate, and you may begin as soon as you please."

Nelson ordered Minerve to open fire, to which Stuart responded. At close range the battle continued for two hours and 50 minutes, the Spanish ship losing its mizzenmast and having its fore and main masts severely damaged. Nelson repeatedly called on Stuart to surrender during the action, but was rebuffed, the Spanish captain responding in English "No Sir, not whilst I have the means of fighting left." Only at 01:20, when casualties had reach unsustainable levels, did Stuart hail Nelson to declare his surrender and call for a cease-fire. Nelson brought the Spanish captain on board Minerve, where he was impressed by his opponent's royal ancestry and returned his sword in a gesture of respect for his resistance. Nelson later recounted losses of 164 on the Spanish ship and seven killed and 34 wounded on his own, although Spanish reports record 12 killed and 43 wounded on Sabina. Although the British frigate was structurally intact, the rigging and sails of Minerve were badly cut up.

As Nelson fought, Preston attacked Ceres opening a heavy fire on the retreating Spanish frigate. Ceres was badly damaged, losing seven killed and 15 wounded in the attack; Preston, who had not suffered a single casualty, reported that the Spanish captain struck his colours during the battle, but Ceres did not stop the withdrawal until it came within sight of a larger Spanish squadron. This force included frigates Matilde and Perla and the 112-gun first rate ship of the line Principe de Asturias. Outnumbered, Preston pulled back as the squadron advanced on Minerve and Sabina.

== Spanish reinforcement ==
Nelson had sent his first and second lieutenants, John Culverhouse and Thomas Hardy aboard Sabina to command a prize crew of 40 petty-officers and sailors, the British frigate towing the disabled Spanish prize when the larger squadron appeared at 04:00. Abandoning the tow rope, Nelson sailed to meet Matilde, substantially ahead of the rest of the squadron as his lieutenants took Sabina away to the south. Minerve and Matilde fought a sharp half-hour engagement, inflicting enough damage to force the captain to wear away from the action. Minerve suffered another 10 sailors wounded. By 04:30 Principe de Asturias, with Perla and the recaptured Ceres was closing the range and threatening Minerve. Unable to oppose such overwhelming force, Nelson turned away towards the distant Blanche, the Spanish in pursuit.

At dawn on 20 December the entire Spanish squadron, rejoined by Matilde, was strung out behind Minerve, the British ship hampered by its damaged rigging. To prevent the damaged Minerve being overrun, Culverhouse took the prize into the path of the Spanish, prominently displaying the British flag over the Spanish. Through careful manoeuvres Sabina was able to distract and delay the Spanish enough to allow Nelson to escape, refusing to surrender until the remaining masts had fallen overboard. Sabina was recaptured and the prize crew taken as prisoners of war.

=== Combatant summary ===
In this table, "Guns" refers to all cannon carried by the ship, including the maindeck guns which were taken into consideration when calculating its rate, exclusive of any carronades carried aboard. broadside.

Ship	Commander	Navy	Guns	Casualties			Notes
Ship	Commander	Navy	Guns	Killed	Wounded	Total	Notes
HMS Minerve	Commodore Horatio Nelson; Captain George Cockburn	Royal Navy	38	7	44	51	Engaged Sabina and Matilde. Lightly damaged.
HMS Blanche	Captain D'Arcy Preston	Royal Navy	32	0	0	0	Engaged Ceres. Undamaged.
Sabina	Captain Jacobo Stuart	Spanish Navy	40	12	43	55	Engaged Minerve. Severely damaged and surrendered. Recaptured 20 December.
Ceres		Spanish Navy	40	7	15	22	Engaged Blanche. Moderately damaged.
Matilde		Spanish Navy	34	?	?	?	Engaged Minerve. Moderately damaged.
Perla		Spanish Navy	34	0	0	0	Unengaged.
Principe de Asturias		Spanish Navy	112	0	0	0	Unengaged.
Source: Clowes, p. 505

== Aftermath ==
Nelson reached Portoferraio on Elba on 27 December, three days ahead of Blanche. There Nelson argued with General John de Burgh, trying to persuade him to remove most of the garrison from the island. De Burgh refused and Nelson left to liaise with the former viceroy of the Anglo-Corsican Kingdom, Sir Gilbert Elliot. Elliot was ashore in Naples, and Nelson had to collect him there, finally sailing for Gibraltar with his passengers and stores on 29 January 1797. As a final service in the Mediterranean, Nelson split his force, sending Blanche directly back to Gibraltar and sailing Minerve to reconnoitre Toulon, Barcelona and Cartagena, confirming in each place that the French and Spanish fleets were at sea.

Nelson arrived at Gibraltar on 9 February, disembarking his passengers. On 29 January Culverhouse, Hardy and the seamen in the prize crew from the Sabina were taken to Gibraltar aboard the Spanish ship of line Terrible and were part of a prisoner exchange which included Stuart. This complete, Nelson sailed onwards to join with Jervis off Cádiz. On 11 February he was chased by Terrible and Neptuno in the Straits of Gibraltar, almost losing Hardy a second time when his boat was cut off. To ensure his subordinate's safety Nelson backed his sails in the face of the Spanish force, a move which unnerved the Spanish who retreated, assuming that a British fleet was in the vicinity. Passing directly through the main Spanish fleet under José de Córdoba y Ramos in heavy fog, Nelson rejoined Jervis on 13 February off Cape St. Vincent and notified the admiral that the Spanish were at sea. Nelson resumed command of Captain and when Jervis attacked Córdoba the following day at the Battle of Cape St. Vincent, Nelson was instrumental in inflicting a serious defeat on the Spanish. More than five decades after the battle the Admiralty recognised the action with a clasp attached to the Naval General Service Medal, awarded upon application to all British participants still living in 1847.

== Bibliography ==
- Bennett, Geoffrey (2002) [1972]. Nelson the Commander. London: Penguin. ISBN 0-141391-29-4.
- Bradford, Ernle (1999) [1977]. Nelson: The Essential Hero. Ware: Wordsworth Military Library. ISBN 1-84022-202-6.
- Clowes, William Laird (1997) [1900]. The Royal Navy, A History from the Earliest Times to 1900, Volume III. London: Chatham Publishing. ISBN 1-86176-012-4.
- Forester, C. S. (2001) [1929]. Nelson. London: Chatham Publishing. ISBN 1-86176-178-3.
- Gardiner, Robert, ed. (2001) [1996]. Fleet Battle and Blockade. London: Caxton Editions. ISBN 1-84067-363-X.
- Gregory, Desmond (1985). The Ungovernable Rock: A History of the Anglo-Corsican Kingdom and its role in Britain's Mediterranean Strategy During the Revolutionary War (1793–1797). London & Toronto: Associated University Presses. ISBN 978-0838632253.
- Ireland, Bernard (2005). The Fall of Toulon: The Last Opportunity the Defeat the French Revolution. Cassell. ISBN 0-3043-6726-5.
- James, William (2002) [1827]. The Naval History of Great Britain, Volume 1, 1793–1796. London: Conway Maritime Press. ISBN 0-85177-905-0.
- Knight, Roger (2005). The Pursuit of Victory : The Life and Achievement of Horatio Nelson. New York: Basic Books. ISBN 978-0-465-03764-3.
- LeJacq, Seth Stein (2015). "Buggery's travels: Royal Navy sodomy on ship and shore in the eighteenth century". Journal of Maritime Research. 17 (2): 102–116. doi:10.1080/21533369.2015.1094980. S2CID 159668408.
- Mostert, Noel (2007). The Line upon a Wind: The Greatest War Fought at Sea Under Sail 1793–1815. Vintage Books. ISBN 9-78071-260-9272.
