= D'Arcy Preston =

Royal Navy Admiral (1765–1847)

Admiral D'Arcy Preston
- Born: 1765
- Died: 21 January 1847 (aged 82); Askham Bryan, York
- Military career
- Allegiance: Kingdom of Great Britain; United Kingdom
- Branch: Royal Navy
- Service years: 1781–1847
- Rank: Admiral of the White
- Commands: HMS Rattlesnake; HMS Termagant; HMS Mignonne; HMS Blanche; HMS Dido; HMS Boston; Whitby Sea Fencibles; HMS Brave
- Conflicts: French Revolutionary Wars; Napoleonic Wars

Admiral D'Arcy Preston (1765 – 21 January 1847) was a British naval officer of the 18th and 19th centuries. He served throughout the French Revolutionary War, most notably commanding HMS Blanche at the action of 19 December 1796. He became a rear-admiral in 1819 and died in 1847 as an admiral of the white.

== Early life ==
D'Arcy Preston was born in 1765, the son of the Reverend John Preston and his wife Jane Consitt.

== Naval career ==
Preston entered the Royal Navy on 10 May 1781 as a volunteer on board HMS Portland on the Newfoundland Station. Between September 1782 and November 1790 Preston served widely, on the North American, Mediterranean, Home, and again the Newfoundland Station. In doing so he saw service on HMS Thorn, HMS Portland, HMS Bulldog, HMS Sphinx, HMS Phaeton, HMS Bedford, and HMS Salisbury, the latter of which while it was the flagship of Vice-Admiral Mark Milbanke. Preston was promoted to lieutenant on 4 November 1790, and served successively on HMS Orestes, HMS Royal Sovereign, and HMS Boyne. It was while he was a lieutenant on Boyne that Preston took part in the first notable action of his career. Boyne was the flagship of Vice-Admiral Sir John Jervis, and took part in his campaign to capture French colonies in the West Indies; in March 1794 Preston commanded Boyne's landing party at the capture of Fort Royal, Martinique. On 4 April, while participating in the invasion of Saint Lucia, Preston was promoted to commander and appointed to the command of the sloop HMS Rattlesnake. In Rattlesnake he took the officers carrying Jervis' reports of his campaign home to England. After this Preston went on half-pay for around two years.

Preston's next command came on 17 May 1796 when he was appointed to the brand new sloop HMS Termagant to serve in the North Sea. This was a short command as Preston was promoted to post-captain on 13 June. While Preston was promoted into HMS Queen at first, this was purely to ensure he held post-captain rank and he did not serve in her. The next true command of Preston was the obsolete 8-pounder frigate HMS Mignonne, followed by HMS Blanche from June. Preston moved from Mignonne to Blanche on the orders of Admiral Jervis after Blanche's previous captain, Charles Sawyer, was court martialled and removed from his command. On 19 December Blanche was sailing in company with HMS Minerve, the flagship of Commodore Horatio Nelson, when they encountered the Spanish 40-gun frigates Sabina and Ceres. (Note: See action of 19 December 1796) Preston in Blanche engaged Ceres and after an engagement in which Ceres lost seven killed and fifteen wounded and Blanche had no casualties, Ceres surrendered. Before Preston could complete his capture of the frigate, the Spanish three-deck ship of the line Principe de Asturias and two frigates appeared, forcing Preston to leave Ceres to the enemy and sail for the protection of Minerve instead. In 1797 Preston commanded the frigate HMS Dido in the Mediterranean Sea until July of that year when he was transferred to HMS Boston, which he commanded until February 1798.

On 4 July 1803 Preston took command of the sea fencibles between Flamborough and the River Tees; he held this position until 28 February 1810. Preston's last active service in the navy was as commodore in HMS Brave commanding the prison ships at Plymouth between 9 November 1813 and July 1814, when Brave was transformed into a powder hulk. Preston was made a superannuated rear-admiral on 24 August 1819, meaning he held the rank of rear-admiral but could not receive further promotion by seniority or command at sea. He was reinstated to the active list of the navy on 12 November 1840 with accrued seniority making him an immediate vice-admiral of the red, and was in turn promoted to admiral of the blue on 23 November 1841. Preston died on 24 January 1847 aged 82 as an admiral of the white.

== Other work ==
Preston served for many years as a deputy lieutenant of the North and West Ridings of Yorkshire.

== Family ==
Preston married Sophia Nares (died 17 November 1832), daughter of the judge Sir George Nares on 29 June 1792. The couple had five sons and two daughters, including:

- Reverend John D'Arcy Jervis Preston, clergyman (died 5 August 1867)
- Edward Preston, Royal Navy officer
- Captain William Preston, Royal Navy officer (died 12 December 1851)
- Lieutenant Charles Edward Preston, Army officer
- Lieutenant D'Arcy Preston, East India Company army officer (died at Barrackpore, India 20 August 1827)
