= HMS Avenger (1794) =

History

France
- Name: Marseillaise
- Acquired: January 1794
- Renamed: Vengeur
- Captured: 17 February 1794

Great Britain
- Name: HMS Avenger
- Acquired: February 1794 by capture
- Fate: Sold 1802

General characteristics
- Class & type: Ship-sloop
- Tons burthen: 355 bm

HMS Avenger was a 16-gun ship-sloop of the British Royal Navy. Previously she was the French privateer Marseillaise and then naval corvette Vengeur, which the British Army captured during the battle for Martinique in 1794. The Admiralty sold her in 1802.

== French career ==
Prior to her service in the French Navy, Vengeur was a French privateer called Marseillaise and may even have been a British armed merchantman Avenger, before that. Marseillaise (the -ois termination gave way to -ais at this period), was a 300-ton, 16-gun privateer corvette from Martinique, commissioned in 1793.

Lloyd's List reported on 27 August 1793 that the French privateer Marsellois, of 22 guns and 180 men, from Dunkirk, had captured Harpooner and two Dutch vessels from the West Indies, and sent all three into Boston.

At some point she captured Fame, which the Royal Navy promptly recaptured.

The French Navy acquired Marseillaise in January 1794 in the Antilles. She was stationed at Martinique when on 5 February, a fleet under the command of Admiral Sir John Jervis landed troops under the command of General Charles Grey. On the 17 February the British troops captured Venguer at St Pierre.

== British career ==
Vengeur was commissioned as a British warship in Martinique and was initially placed under the command of Lieutenant James Milne. On 17 March, boats from Avenger took part in a cutting out expedition in Fort Royal Bay, which captured the French frigate Bienvenue. When Milne was killed in action, command of Avenger passed to Lieutenant Henry William Bayntun.

Avenger and her crew took part in the capture of Gaudeloupe in April 1794. Bayntun remained in command of Avenger until 4 May 1794 when he was promoted to Post Captain and appointed to Bienvenue, the frigate he had captured the previous month. Edward Griffith became the captain of Avenger and on 22 September he arrived with her at Portsmouth. In 1795 she was under the command of Charles Ogle. She was registered as HMS Avenger in June 1798 but was not fitted out for sea again.

In 1797 Avenger was among the vessels that qualified for prize money for stores and the like captured at Martinique, St Lucia, and Guadeloupe between March and April 1794. There was a second, much larger disbursement in 1800. A third disbursement, smaller than the first, took place in 1806.

== Fate ==
The Admiralty sold Avenger on 9 September 1802.
