= Henry William Bayntun =

Royal Navy Admiral (1766–1840)

Admiral Sir Henry William Bayntun GCB
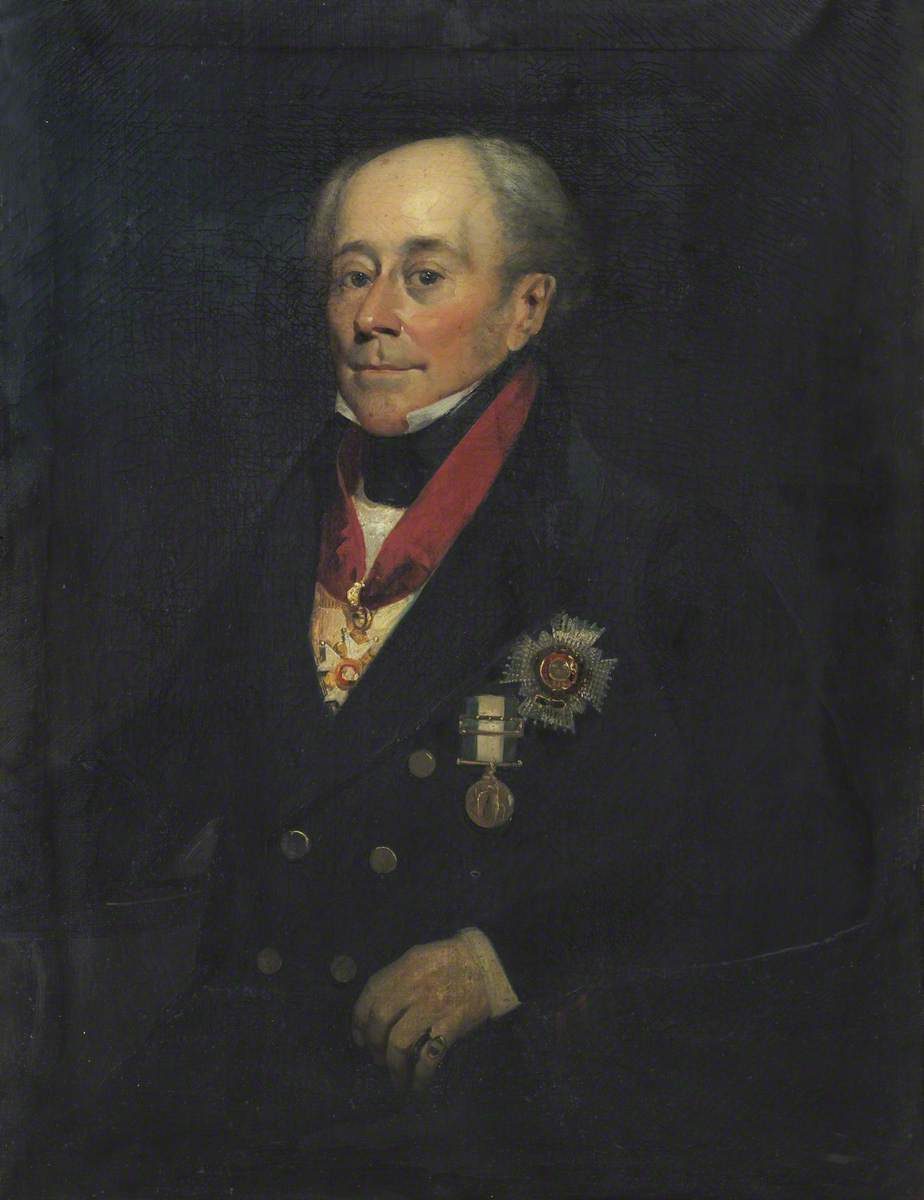
- c. 1835 portrait of Bayntun
- Born: 1766; Algiers, North Africa
- Died: 16 December 1840 (aged 73–74); Bath, Somerset
- Military career
- Allegiance: Great Britain; United Kingdom
- Branch: Royal Navy
- Service years: 1777–1840
- Rank: Admiral
- Commands: HMS Avenger; HMS Undaunted; HMS Reunion; HMS Quebec; HMS Thunderer; HMS Cumberland; HMS Leviathan; HMS Milford; HMY Royal Sovereign
- Conflicts: American War of Independence; French Revolutionary Wars; Battle of Martinique (1794); Invasion of Guadeloupe (1794); Napoleonic Wars; Blockade of Saint-Domingue; Battle of Trafalgar; British invasions of the River Plate
- Awards: Knight Grand Cross of the Order of the Bath

Admiral Sir Henry William Bayntun GCB (1766 – 16 December 1840) was a Royal Navy officer who served in the American War of Independence and French Revolutionary and Napoleonic Wars. His service included extensive operations in the West Indies followed by shipwreck, the Battle of Trafalgar and the disastrous British invasions of the River Plate in 1807.

== Early career ==
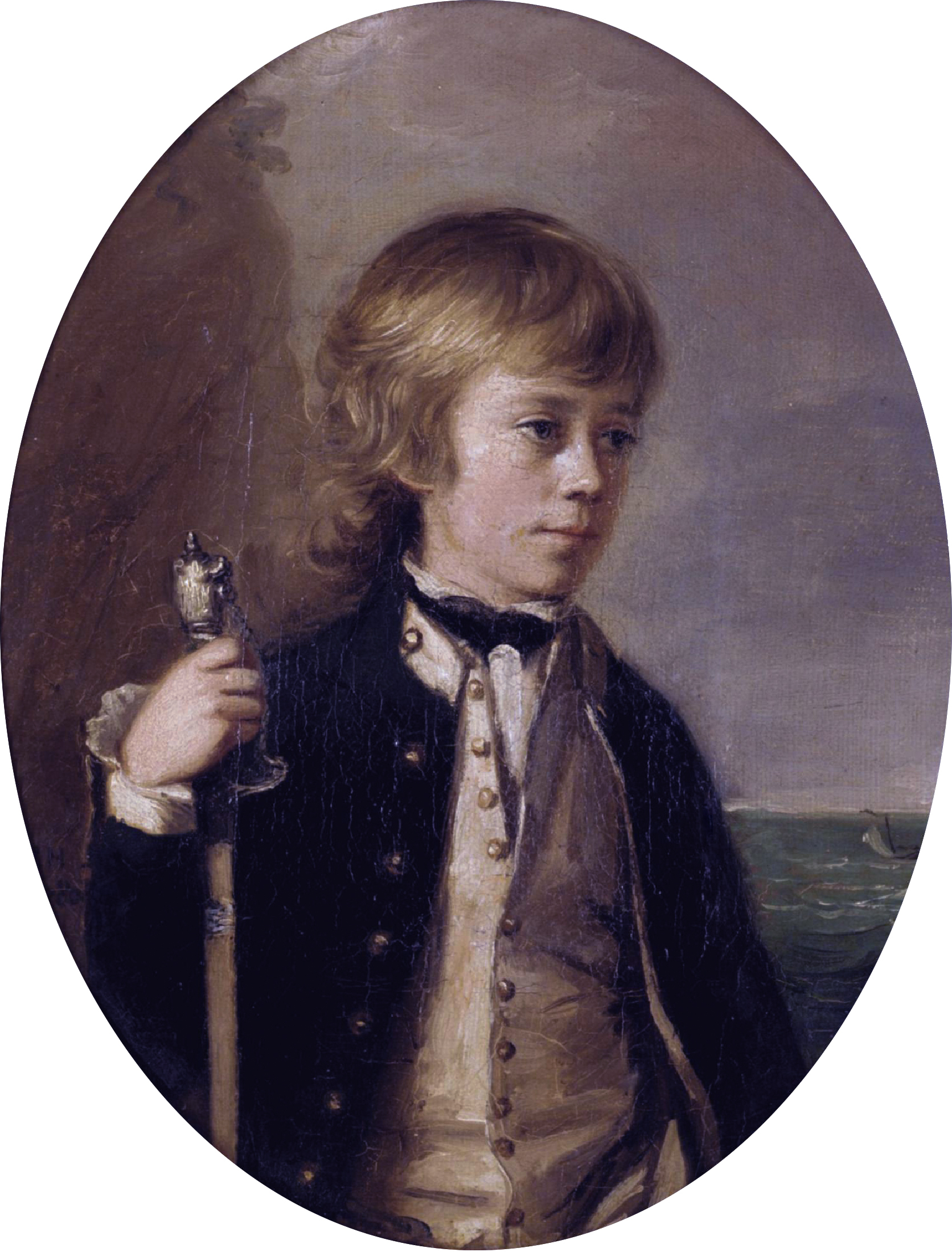
1780 portrait of Bayntun by Thomas Hickey

Born in 1766 in Algiers, where his father was the British consul general, Bayntun joined the navy at a young age and received his lieutenancy at just seventeen on 15 April 1783. When war broke out with Revolutionary France in 1793, Bayntun was sent to the West Indies under Admiral Sir John Jervis and, after taking part in the capture of Martinique, he was given command of the sloop HMS Avenger. Bayntun was also present during the invasion of Guadeloupe and on 4 May 1794, he was appointed post captain of HMS Undaunted, the former French frigate, Bienvenue, captured during the Battle of Martinique.

Bayntun was subsequently given command of the 36-gun HMS Reunion, which was wrecked in December 1796. In January 1799, he was appointed to HMS Quebec. He then commanded ships of the line, including HMS Thunderer and HMS Cumberland, with which he won acclaim during a successful blockade of the French Caribbean islands following their return to France under the terms of the Treaty of Amiens. In 1803 he captured the French frigate Créole, along with her convoy and hundreds of troops aboard returning to France.

== Trafalgar campaign ==
In 1804 Bayntun returned to England after ten years in the West Indies, and was given command of the fast third rate HMS Leviathan. She joined Nelson's fleet off Brest and subsequently sailed to the West Indies again in pursuit of the French fleet. After learning that the French had returned to European waters, Leviathan sailed to Gibraltar before arriving off Cádiz on 8 October 1805. Bayntun was in this way unusual amongst Trafalgar captains, many of whom had only just arrived on station for the blockade.

At the Battle of Trafalgar on 21 October, Bayntun in Leviathan was fifth in Nelson's weather column, after HMS Victory, HMS Temeraire, HMS Neptune and HMS Conqueror. Leviathan raked the French flagship Bucentaure before engaging the massive Santissima Trinidad. Seeing the distant approach of Rear-Admiral Dumanoir's squadron from the north, Captain Thomas Hardy ordered Leviathan and other ships to close with the enemy. Leviathan engaged the Spanish ship San Agustín, which was supported by Intrepide. Conqueror then joined the fight and Bayntun was able to lay his ship alongside the badly damaged San Augustin whilst continuing to fire into Intrepide. As the 74-gun HMS Orion passed, Bayntun shouted at her captain, Edward Codrington, "I hope you will make a better fist of it!" Some time later, with 160 of his crew dead or wounded, Commodore Don Fellipe of the San Augustin surrendered his sword to Bayntun. Of Leviathan's crew, four had been killed and just over 20 wounded during the battle.

After the battle, with the weather worsening and concerns of a counter-attack; Vice-Admiral Collingwood, in command since the death of Nelson, ordered many of the prizes destroyed. Bayntun co-ordinated the evacuation of the ships closest to him which were to be scuttled. Bayntun's report on the matter stated that; although he had done his best to carry out the orders he'd been given, due to the weather, "...much less has been done than I most ardently wished and many boats have been lost."

Leviathan also lost her prize, the San Augustin, which was burnt as she foundered some days after the action. The Leviathan suffered little damage during the battle and subsequent storm, and was able to return to Gibraltar unaided. Bayntun was the guidon bearer at Nelson's state funeral during the water procession between Greenwich and Whitehall. He was also among the many officers that the Lloyd's Patriotic Fund honoured with gifts.

== Later career ==
In 1807 Bayntun participated in the naval aspects of the failed invasion of Argentina, but escaped the condemnation received by other of the officers involved. He continued in service, taking command of the 74-gun HMS Milford in 1809, and commanding the royal yacht HMY Royal Sovereign from 1811 until his promotion to rear-admiral of the blue on 12 August 1812. With the defeat of Napoleon and his exile to Elba, Bayntun was made a Knight Commander of the Order of the Bath in January 1815.

Bayntun continued in the Navy as a semi-retired officer slowly gaining promotions, being advanced to rear-admiral of the white on 4 June 1814; rear-admiral of the red on 12 August 1819, and then to vice-admiral of the blue on 19 July 1819. He was further promoted to vice-admiral of the white on 27 May 1825 and vice-admiral of the red on 22 July 1830. On 10 January 1837 he was made an admiral of the blue and a Knight Grand Cross of the Order of the Bath on 25 October 1839.

Bayntun married Susannah, co-heiress with her half sister Lady William Beauclerk (mother of George 4th Duke of St Albans) of Sir John Warden 2nd Bt of Choimeaton, Leyland and Holyport. Their daughter Sussannah was born 1809 and married 31 May 1839 at St George's Hanover Square Richard Verity of Dean House, Huntington (son of Isaiah Verity of Ash Hall, Glamorgan).

Henry William Bayntun died in Bath in 1840 and is buried in All Saints' Church, Weston, Bath, together with several family members.

The Captain-class frigate HMS Bayntun was named for him. She served during the Second World War.

== Bibliography ==
- Heathcote, T.A. (2005). Nelson's Trafalgar Captains and Their Battles. Barnsley, Yorks.: Pen and Sword Books. ISBN 1-84415-182-4.
- Winfield, Rif (2007) British Warships in the Age of Sail 1714–1792: Design, Construction, Careers and Fates. Seaforth Publishing. ISBN 978-1-84415-700-6.
