= Edward Sneyd Clay =

Royal Navy officer

Rear-Admiral Edward Sneyd Clay
- Born: c.1768
- Died: 3 February 1846 (aged 77–78) Southwell, Nottinghamshire
- Allegiance: Great Britain; United Kingdom
- Branch: Royal Navy
- Service years: 1783–1846
- Rank: Rear-Admiral of the Red
- Commands: HMS Zebra; HMS St George; HMS Temeraire; HMS Nymphe; HMS Raisonnable
- Conflicts: French Revolutionary Wars; Siege of Toulon; Capture of Corsica; Battle of Camperdown; Anglo-Russian invasion of Holland; Battle of Copenhagen; Napoleonic Wars; Gunboat War

Rear-Admiral Edward Sneyd Clay (c. 1768 – 3 February 1846) was an officer of the Royal Navy who served during the American War of Independence, and the French Revolutionary and Napoleonic Wars.

Clay entered the navy just before the end of the American War of Independence. He found continued employment during the drawdown of the navy in peacetime, and was in the Mediterranean during the first naval campaigns against Revolutionary France. He saw action at the Siege of Toulon and the capture of Corsica during 1793 and 1794, and was promoted to lieutenant. Back in British waters by 1798 he took part in the Battle of Camperdown, and was wounded in the heavy fighting. Having impressed his commander, Admiral Adam Duncan, he was given the task of carrying the despatches of the Anglo-Russian invasion of Holland back to Britain, and was then promoted to his first command. He continued to be involved in the major naval actions of his age, serving at the Battle of Copenhagen in 1801.

Command of several ships of the line followed, and he continued his connection with the Baltic, serving in the Gunboat War against the Danes. His career nearly came to an end when his ship, a 36-gun frigate, was wrecked at the entrance to the Firth of Forth after a confusion over signal lights. The subsequent court-martial acquitted him of blame, and he spent the last years of the Napoleonic Wars commanding a receiving ship. He never again served at sea after the wars, but received several promotions, finally dying in 1846 as rear-admiral of the red.

== Early life ==
Clay was born c. 1768 and entered the Navy towards the end of the American War of Independence, on 15 April 1783. He was initially a midshipman aboard the 74-gun HMS Hector, under Captain Sir John Hamilton, but later moved to a number of different ships after the end of the war. In the years of peace between 1783 and 1792, Clay served in succession on the Home, West India and Mediterranean stations. He was first aboard the 50-gun HMS Europa, the flagship of Vice-Admiral James Gambier, but moved to the yacht HMY Catherine under Captain Sir George Young, the 38-gun HMS Phaeton under Captain George Dawson, and the 32-gun HMS Solebay under Captain William Squire. By September 1793, after the outbreak of the French Revolutionary Wars, Clay was serving aboard the 74-gun HMS Alcide, under Captain Robert Linzee.

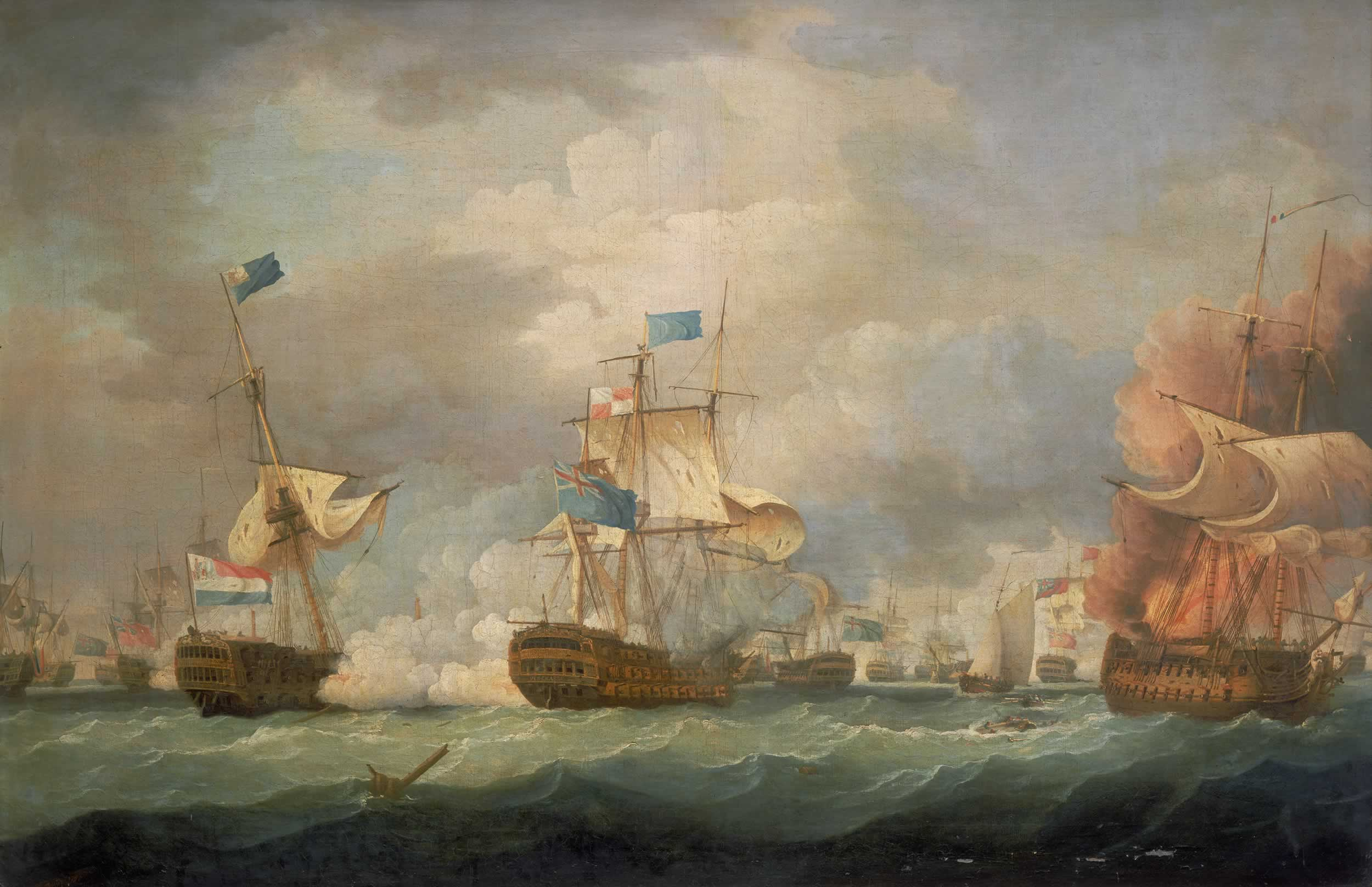
The Battle of Camperdown, 11 October 1797, Thomas Whitcombe, 1798, National Maritime Museum. The painting shows the British flagship Venerable engaged with the Dutch flagship Vrijheid.

Clay saw action aboard Alcide in the Mediterranean, and was present at the occupation and siege of Toulon. Linzee later was posted as a commodore, and Alcide supported the operations to capture Corsica, working alongside Corsican General Pasquale Paoli. Clay was promoted to lieutenant during these operations, on 19 May 1794, and was appointed to the 20-gun sloop HMS Mulette, at first under Captain Joseph Bullen, and later under Captain Richard Goddard. He then moved to the 74-gun HMS Magnificent, which was then being commanded by Clay's old captain, William Squire. Clay soon changed ships, serving aboard the 74-gun HMS Montagu under Captain John Knight, and then the 74-gun HMS Venerable. Venerable was at this time the flagship of Admiral Adam Duncan, commander of The Downs squadron. On 11 October 1797 Duncan's fleet engaged a Dutch fleet under Vice-Admiral Jan Willem de Winter and decisively defeated it at the Battle of Camperdown. Venerable was heavily engaged in the fighting, losing 13 seamen and two marines, and having a further 62 men wounded. Clay was one of the two of Venerable's lieutenants wounded, apparently severely. He nevertheless recovered and resumed his service, joining Duncan's new flagship, the 74-gun HMS Kent. Aboard the Kent he was involved in the Anglo-Russian invasion of Holland, and was chosen by Duncan to deliver his despatches detailing the successful invasion to Britain. In his despatch Duncan advised the Lords of the Admiralty to apply for any further details they required to Lieutenant Clay, describing him as 'an intelligent and deserving officer'.

== Command ==
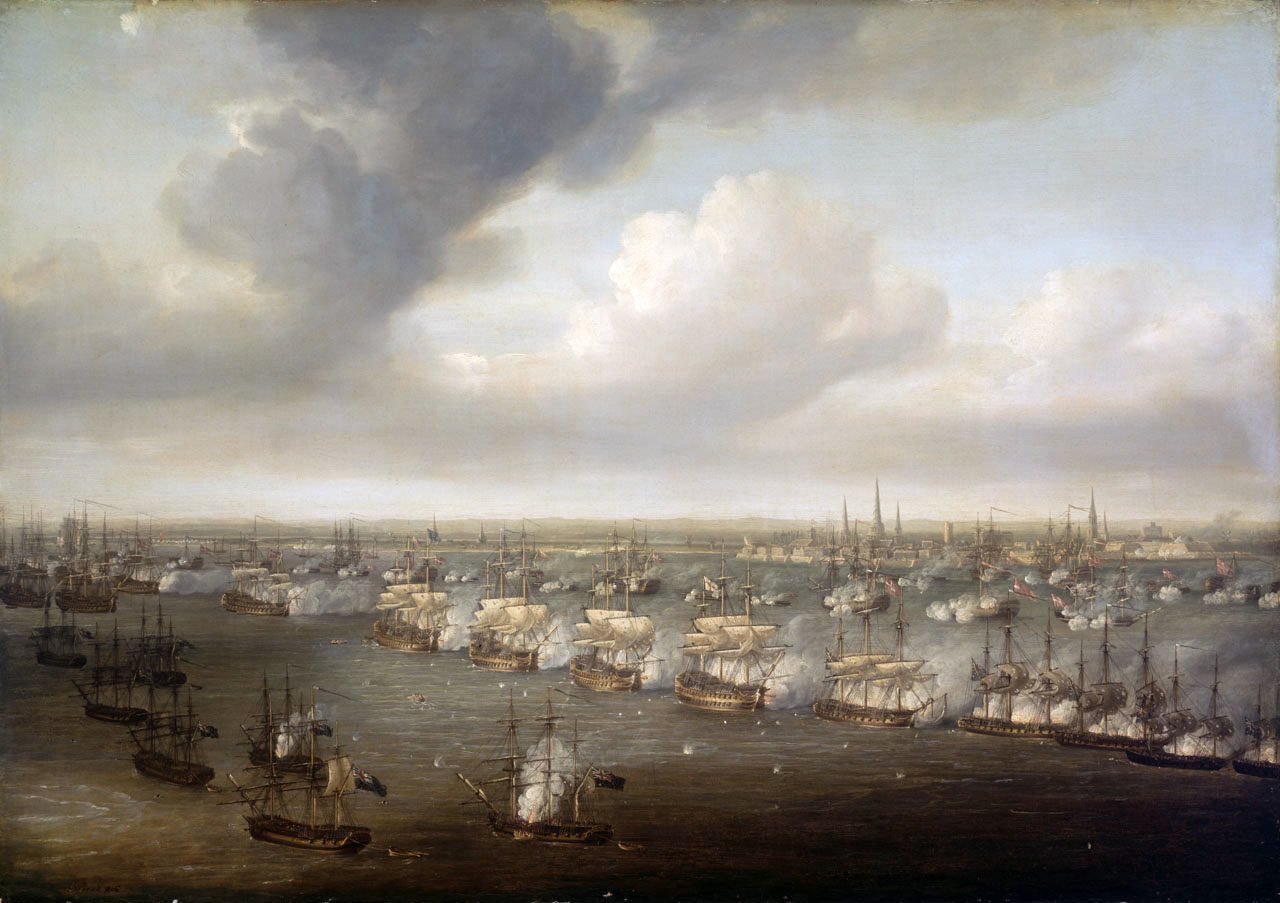
The Battle of Copenhagen, as painted by Nicholas Pocock. The British line is diagonally across the foreground, the city of Copenhagen in the background and the Danish line between. The ships in the left foreground are British bomb vessels. Clay's bomb vessel Zebra would be among them.

The deliverer of important despatches was usually marked out for special favour by the Admiralty, and Clay's reward was a promotion to be master and commander of the bomb vessel HMS Zebra on 3 December 1799. He spent 1800 serving in the North Sea, and the following year was assigned to the fleet dispatched to Copenhagen under Vice-Admiral Archibald Dickson to support a diplomatic mission led by Lord Whitworth. The subsequent negotiations over matters such as Britain's position on the searching of neutral warships for contraband, ended in Britain's favour, given that Whitworth was backed up by a strong force, and the Danes had not yet completed fortifying their capital. The Danes remained disgruntled, and by early 1801 had concluded a treaty with Russia and Sweden to form the League of Armed Neutrality. Concerned by these developments, the British dispatched a fleet under Sir Hyde Parker to take action against the members of the league. Zebra was again sent out to the Baltic, and took part in the Battle of Copenhagen on 2 April 1801.

After serving on this station, Clay was promoted to post-captain on 29 April 1802. He served from 20 July 1805 until May 1808 as the Regulating Officer at Belfast, and then joined the 98-gun HMS St George as her commanding officer. During this time St George was the flagship of Rear-Admiral Sir Eliab Harvey. Clay then moved to take command of the 98-gun HMS Temeraire on 6 February 1809, with orders to return to the Baltic as the flagship of Rear-Admiral Sir Manley Dixon. War had broken out with the Danes after the Second Battle of Copenhagen in 1807, and a British fleet was stationed in the Baltic under Sir James Saumarez. Temeraire arrived in May 1809 and was sent to blockade Karlskrona on the Swedish coast.

Temeraire carried out several patrols, including one with the 64-gun HMS Ardent and the frigate HMS Melpomene. During this patrol the Melpomene was attacked by a flotilla of thirty Danish gunboats. Clay immediately dispatched boats to her assistance, which helped to fight off the Danish gunboats, and then towed the damaged frigate to safety. Temeraire's later Baltic service involved being dispatched to observe the Russian fleet at Revel, during which time she made a survey of the island of Nargen. After important blockading and convoy escort work, Temeraire was ordered back to Britain as winter arrived, and she arrived in Plymouth in November 1809. Clay left her at this point and was appointed to the 36-gun HMS Nymphe.

== Nymphe and wreck ==
Clay had some success against privateers during his time in command, capturing the 2-gun Danish privateer Norwegian Girl on 26 October 1810. Clay then returned to Leith in December 1810 after a month cruising off the Norwegian coast, in company with the 32-gun HMS Pallas. Returning at night the two frigates had difficulty distinguishing their exact location, and the pilot aboard Nymphe mistook the light of a lime kiln burning at Broxmouth, for the signal light marking the Isle of May. Though the May light was visible, it was instead mistaken for the Bell Rock light. The master of Nymphe agreed with the pilot, with the consequence that both frigates ran aground at the entrance to the Firth of Forth on the night of 18 December, with the Nymphe striking a rock known as the Devil's Ark, near Skethard. Both Pallas and Nymphe had to be abandoned. The crew of Nymphe were taken off without loss of life. Clay received the customary court martial for the loss of his ship. The court acquitted Clay and his officers of blame for the loss, instead placing responsibility on the master, Mr G. Scott and the pilot, Mr C. Gascoigne, determining that they had been 'very incautious', and severely reprimanding both.

== Later life ==
Clay's final command was a posting to the 64-gun HMS Raisonnable on 16 July 1812, which by this time was a receiving ship at Sheerness Dockyard. He commanded Raisonnable until June 1814, when she was paid off as the Napoleonic Wars drew to a close. He never received another seagoing command, being placed on half-pay in 1823, though he was advanced to flag rank on 10 January 1837. He was restored to full pay in 1840 and was in receipt of a pension for his wounds to the value of £250. Further promotions followed, until he died at the rank of rear-admiral of the red on 3 February 1846 at Southwell, Nottinghamshire, at the age of 78. He had been married, though his wife had predeceased him on 20 April 1837.
