= Harpooner (1791 ship) =

1791 ship

History

Great Britain
- Name: Harpooner
- Owner: J. Caves
- Builder: Bristol
- Launched: 1791
- Fate: Captured 1793

General characteristics
- Tons burthen: 249, or 250, (bm)
- Propulsion: Sail

Harpooner was launched at Bristol in 1791. A French privateer captured her in 1793 on Harpooner's first whaling voyage to the South Seas and took her into Boston. This gave rise to an important court case.

== Career ==
Harpooner entered Lloyd's Register (LR) in 1791 with Ramsdall, master, changing to B. Folger, J. Caves, owner, and trade Bristol—South Seas fishery. She was reported to have been at 50°N 8°W on 11 September 1791, and on the coast of Peru on 10 April 1792 with 25 tons of sperm oil. Also, in 1792, she visited Callao.

Lloyd's List (LL) reported on 27 August 1793 that the French privateer Marsellois, of 22 guns and 180 men, from Dunkirk, had captured Harpooner and two Dutch vessels from the West Indies, and sent all three into Boston. (Note: Marseillaise (the -ois termination gave way to -ais at this period), was a 300-ton, 16-gun privateer corvette from Martinique, commissioned in 1793. The French Navy took her into service as Vengeur. In 1794 she was stationed at Martinique when on 5 February, a fleet under the command of Admiral Sir John Jervis landed troops under the command of General Charles Grey. On 17 February British troops captured Venguer at St Pierre. The British Royal Navy took her into service as HMS Avenger.)

== Court case ==
The case of Folger vs. Lecuyer was important because it resulted in the United States ending French extraterritorial rights with respect to privateers and their prizes.

On 6 December 1793, a federal court in Boston declared federal jurisdiction in the prize case involving the British whaler Harpooner. The French privateer Marseilles, Jacques Louis Lecuyer, master, of Le Havre, had seized. Unfortunately for the French, her captain was Brown Folger, who was a well-known whaler from Nantucket. Not only was he an American citizen, he was part owner of the cargo. Folger argued that his cargo was landed before the outbreak of war between France and Britain, and that Article 14 of the Franco-American Treaty of Amity and Commerce exempted cargoes of whale oil. Lecuyer argued that the French Republic's consulate in Boston had jurisdiction based on the Treaty of Alliance of 1778 and the Consular Convention of 1787.

By its decision the Massachusetts District Court asserted Federal jurisdiction in Admiralty matters, and ended the French Republic's extraterritorial rights in such matters. Justice John Lowell ruled that it was not the intent of the Treaty to bind the United States and France to make common cause in all future wars that either country might engage in.
