= Jonathan Faulknor the elder =

Royal Navy Admiral (fl. 1744–1795)

Admiral Jonathan Faulknor
- Died: 24 June 1795; London
- Relatives: Robert Faulknor (nephew)
- Military career
- Allegiance: Kingdom of Great Britain
- Branch: Royal Navy
- Rank: Admiral of the Blue
- Commands: HMS Furnace; HMS Mercury; HMS Superb; HMS Royal Oak; HMS Victory; HMS Princess Royal; HMS Triumph
- Conflicts: Seven Years' War; Capture of Gorée; American Revolutionary War; Battle of Ushant; Relief of Gibraltar; Battle of Cape Spartel; French Revolutionary Wars

Jonathan Faulknor (fl. 1744 – 24 June 1795) was an officer of the Royal Navy who served during the Seven Years' War, the American War of Independence, and the French Revolutionary Wars, in a career which spanned fifty years.

The son of a distinguished naval officer, Jonathan Faulknor continued the family tradition and forged a career in the navy. He was made an officer prior to the Seven Years' War and commanded his first ships before it ended. His service was punctuated by periods without command of a ship, and times as captain of guardships. Nevertheless, he was able to impress his superiors with his services, including his cool handling of a crisis when his ship ran aground off Cork. He was back in command of ships during the American War of Independence, and was flag captain to Admiral Keppel at the battle of Ushant in 1778. He captained several other ships during the war, relieving Gibraltar in 1782 with Howe and seeing action at the Battle of Cape Spartel.

Promoted to flag rank after the war, he rose to be admiral of the blue before his death in 1795, during the French Revolutionary Wars, having only once hoisted his flag, during the period of the Spanish Armament in 1791.

== Family and early life ==
Jonathan Faulknor was born into a substantial naval dynasty of the 18th century. His grandfather, William Faulknor, had commanded ships during the War of the Spanish Succession, while his father, Samuel Faulknor, had commanded HMS Victory, and was killed when she foundered in a storm in 1744. Two of Jonathan's brothers, Samuel and Robert, rose to command several ships during the Seven Years' War, while his nephew, also called Robert, died in combat while fighting a French frigate. Jonathan Faulknor also embarked on a career in the navy, and after seeing some service, was promoted to lieutenant on 24 August 1753. He saw service in the Seven Years' War and on 28 September 1758 was promoted to commander and appointed to the bomb vessel HMS Furnace. He commanded Furnace in Commodore Augustus Keppel's force at the Capture of Gorée in December 1758, and on 9 July 1759 he was commissioned as a post-captain and took command of the 20-gun HMS Mercury.

Faulknor took Mercury out to the West Indies and remained with her until 1762. He then appears to have spent some time without a ship, for he is not recorded as commanding another vessel until 1767, when he took command of the 74-gun HMS Superb, the flagship of Rear-Admiral Sir John Moore. Superb was the Portsmouth guardship at this time, and Faulknor commanded her during Moore's time as Commander-in-Chief, Portsmouth. She carried out some other duties however, including being sent out to the Mediterranean to convey troops stationed at Menorca back to Britain. While entering the harbour at Cork, she ran aground through the ignorance of her pilot. Faulknor's cool demeanour after the accident was widely praised, and Superb was safely re-floated and taken into a dockyard for repairs. Superb was paid off in 1770, and Faulknor was again without a ship.

== American War of Independence ==
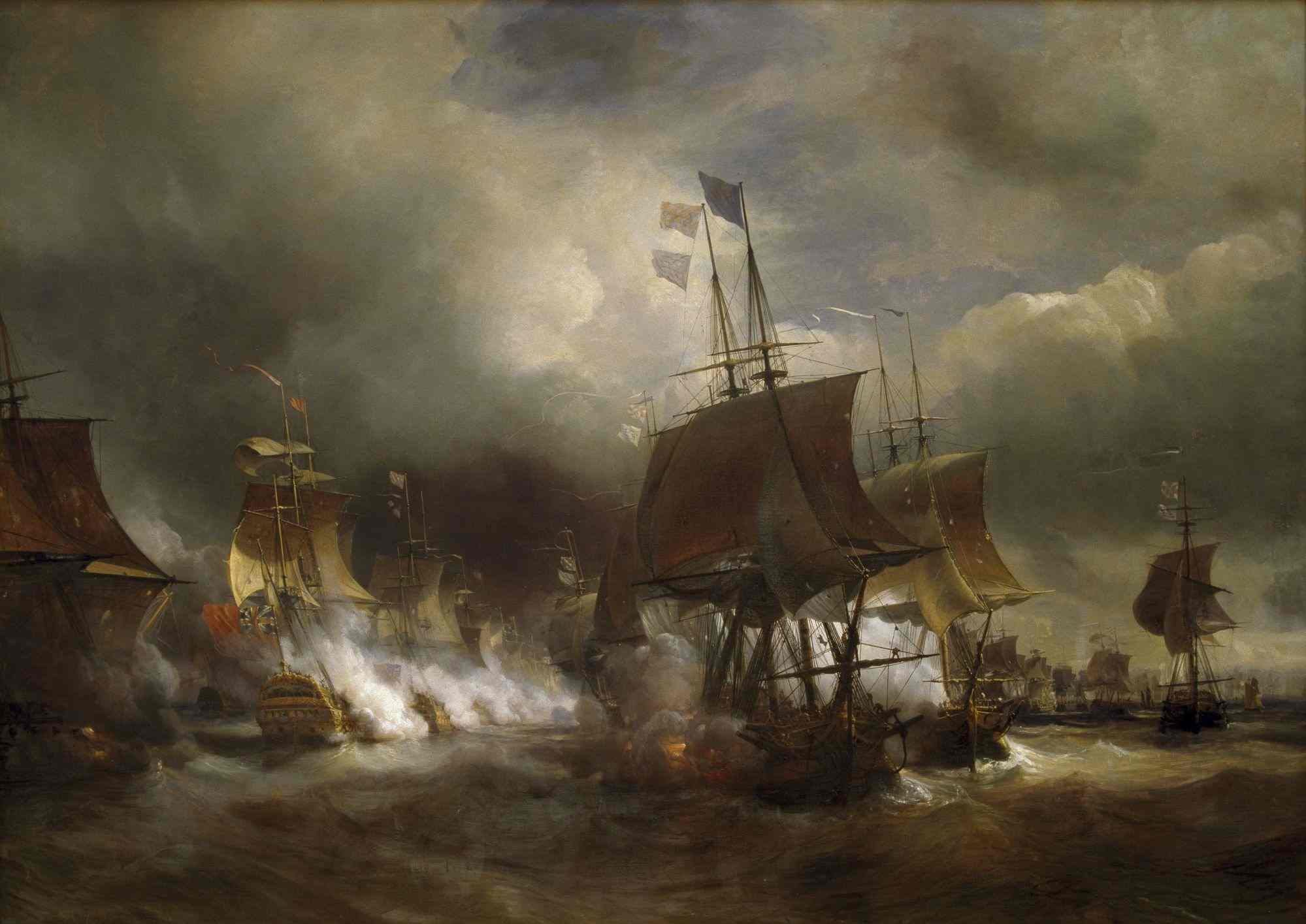
Depiction of the battle of Ushant, c. 1848, by Théodore Gudin

The outbreak of the American War of Independence brought further opportunities for Faulknor, and he commissioned the 74-gun HMS Royal Oak in 1777. He served initially with Robert Digby's squadron in the English Channel in winter that year. He then became flag captain to Admiral Keppel aboard the 100-gun HMS Victory in 1778, and served aboard her during the battle of Ushant on 27 July 1778. The captain of the fleet during the battle was Rear-Admiral John Campbell. Faulknor was commended by both Keppel and Campbell for his services during the battle, and was given the honour of bringing the despatches back to Britain.

He took command of the 98-gun HMS Princess Royal in May 1782 and went out with Richard Howe, 1st Earl Howe's fleet to relieve Gibraltar. Faulknor saw action at the Battle of Cape Spartel on 20 October 1782, in which Princess Royal had one man killed. The fleet then returned to Britain, where Faulknor continued in command of Princess Royal while she was the Portsmouth guardship. He moved to the 74-gun HMS Triumph in 1785, still based at Portsmouth, and commanded her until April 1786.

== Flag rank and later life ==
Faulknor was promoted to rear-admiral of the white on 24 September 1787, beginning a steady progression through the flag ranks according to his seniority. He became rear-admiral of the red on 21 September 1790, and in 1791 hoisted his flag on the 98-gun HMS Barfleur, during the Spanish Armament. The crisis passed without breaking into open war, and Barfleur was paid off in September that year. Faulknor appears to have spent the rest of his career ashore, residing at Havant. He was promoted to vice-admiral of the blue on 1 February 1793, marking the outbreak of the French Revolutionary Wars, and was further promoted to vice-admiral of the white on 12 April 1794 and then vice-admiral of the red on 12 July 1794. His final promotion was to admiral of the blue on 1 June 1795. Now a full admiral, Faulknor made the journey to London to be presented to King George III. He arrived at the capital on 22 June, and was at the house of Colonel Hon. Stanhope on Park Lane the following morning, when he was suddenly struck with a fit of apoplexy.^{[a]} He died the next day, 24 June 1795. He was survived by at least one son, Jonathan, who died a rear-admiral of the red in 1809. At least one of Jonathan Faulknor the younger's children also became an officer in the navy, maintaining the family's long naval tradition. The Gentleman's Magazine eulogised that "In his death the country has lost a most gallant and meritorious officer, and his family an excellent father and friend. His well-known nautical abilities, and extensive knowledge in his profession, are above panegyric, and his name will be revered to future ages."

== Notes ==
a. This is probably the Hon. Henry Fitzroy Stanhope, second son of William Stanhope, 2nd Earl of Harrington. Henry Stanhope, a colonel by 1794, is recorded as having married an 'Elizabeth Falconer or Faulkner', and The Gentleman's Magazine recorded that she was his niece.
