= Battle of Cape Finisterre (1761) =

1761 battle of the Seven Years' War

- Part of the Seven Years' War
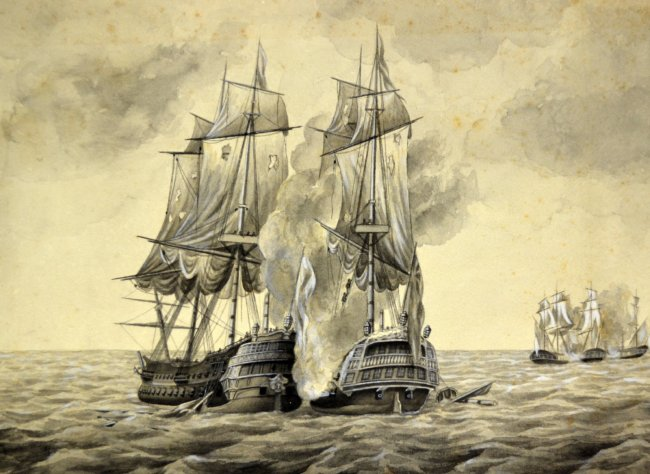
- Bellona and Courageux, Henry Fletcher
Date	13–14 August 1761
Location	Off Cape Finisterre, Atlantic Ocean
Result	British victory

Belligerents
Great Britain	France

Commanders and leaders
Robert Faulknor	Dugué L'Ambert †

Strength
1 ship of the line 1 frigate	1 ship of the line 2 frigates

Casualties and losses
11 killed 44 wounded	240 killed 110 wounded 1 ship of the line captured

The Battle of Cape Finisterre was a naval engagement fought off the Northern Spanish Atlantic coast near Cape Finisterre between British and French squadrons during the Seven Years' War. A British force comprising the 74-gun ship of the line HMS Bellona and 36-gun frigate HMS Brilliant was sailing from Lisbon to Britain with a cargo of specie when on 13 August they encountered a French force comprising the 74-gun Courageux and the 32-gun frigates Malicieuse and Hermine. The British ships immediately chased the French squadron, maintaining contact through the night, and on the following morning two separate engagements occurred as Brilliant fought the French frigates and Bellona battled Courageux.

In a short but hard-fought engagement both ships of the line were damaged. The battle was decided when Bellona's captain, Robert Faulknor, succeeded in manoeuvering his ship into a raking position, inflicting severe damage and appalling casualties on Courageux, forcing the French ship to surrender. Although outnumbered, Brilliant successfully held off the French frigates, preventing them from intervening in the battle between the ships of the line, Malicieuse and Hermine both successfully withdrew following the surrender of Courageux. Courageux was subsequently repaired and recommissioned in the Royal Navy, serving for 35 years in two later conflicts.

== Background ==
Following their defeat at the Battle of Quiberon Bay in 1759, the French Navy was no longer able to compete with the Royal Navy for control of European waters in the Seven Years' War. In April 1761 the Royal Navy capitalised on its regional dominance to invade Belle Île, an island off Brittany, which was captured in June. With the main French Atlantic fleet confined to harbour, smaller squadrons were sent to conduct raiding operations. One squadron comprised the 74-gun ship of the line Courageux under Captain Dugué L'Ambert and the 32-gun frigates Malicieuse under Captain Longueville and Hermine under Captain Montigney, which was sent to the West Indies. After a very successful raiding cruise, the squadron returned to European Waters in early August.

In the late evening of 13 August 1761 L'Ambert's squadron was sailing towards the Spanish coast, off Cape Finisterre, when sails were sighted close inshore to the north east. This was a British squadron of the 74-gun ship of the line HMS Bellona under Captain Robert Faulknor and 36-gun frigate HMS Brilliant under Captain John Loggie sailing from Lisbon to Britain with a cargo of more than £100,000 in specie. The French initially identified both British ships as ships of the line and turned away in the face of perceived British superiority, attempting to escape in the darkness, but the bright moonlight enabled the British to remain in pursuit.

== Battle ==
At 05:00 on the morning of 14 August, L'Ambert changed his opinion of the strength of the British squadron, assuming that Bellona was a 50-gun fourth rate ship. Confident of victory, he turned his squadron back towards Faulknor's ships, ordering Malicieuse and Hermine to attack Brilliant while he led Courageux against Bellona. The ships of the line approached one another head on, L'Ambert pulling Courageux alongside Bellona at 06:25 and opening fire with his broadside at close range. Faulknor delayed his response until the second broadside, his crew firing two broadsides of their own in quick succession while he backed his sails, throwing Bellona into reverse and swinging alongside Courageux. The French ship's gunnery was however more effective in the initial stages of the action, and Faulknor's mizzen-mast was brought crashing down nine minutes after the first gunfire. When a crewman expressed dismay at this damage, Faulknor was reported to have responded "Confound you! you rascal, what has a two-decked ship to do with a mizzen-mast in the time of action. See and knock away his mizzen-mast."

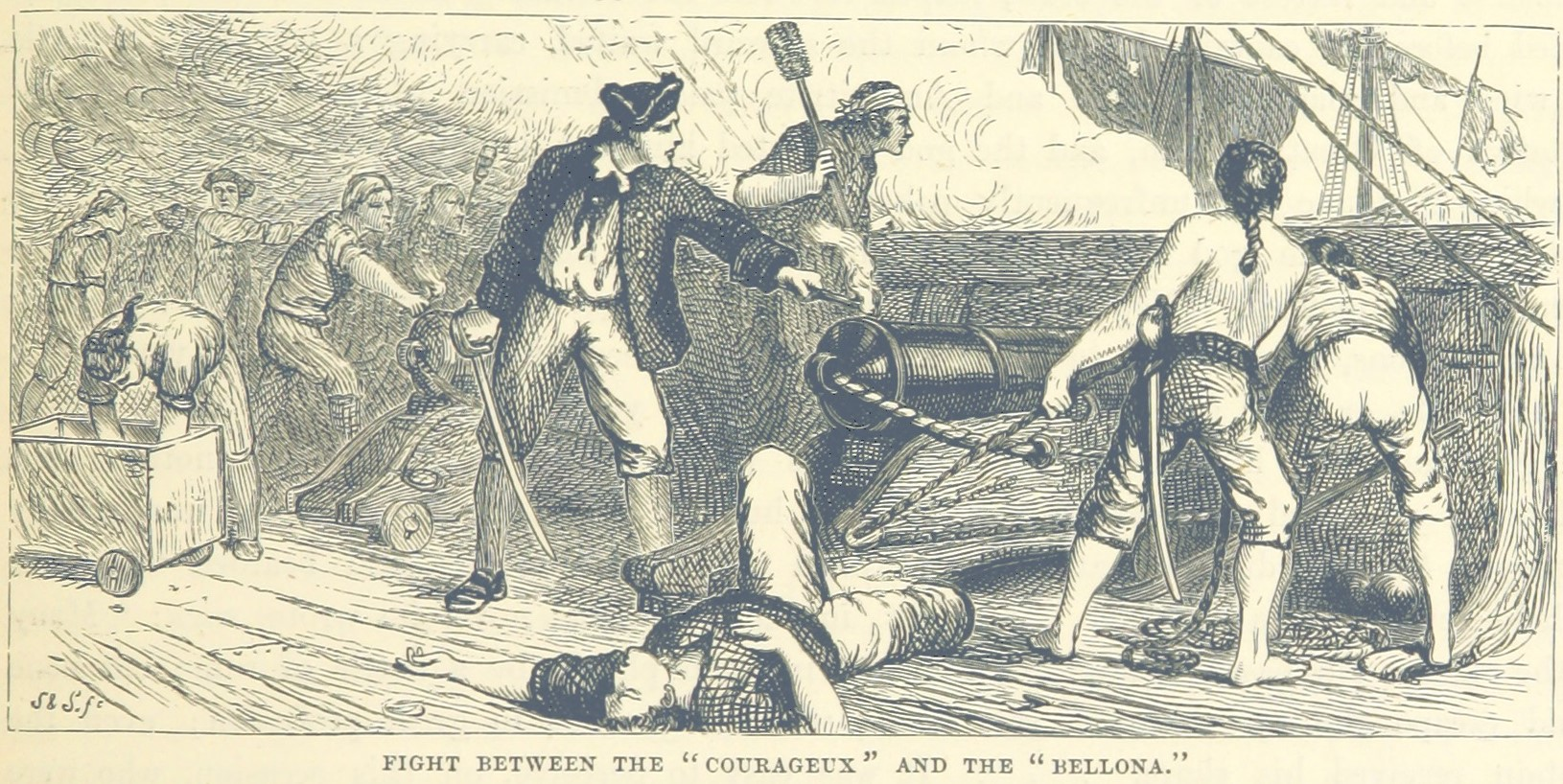
A view from the deck of Bellona during the engagement with Courageux, by Frederick Whymper.

Faulknor was now concerned that, with his ability to manoeuvre his ship compromised, L'Ambert might take the opportunity to escape, and he planned to initiate a boarding action to seize Courageux, but the French ship sheered away, her own mizzen-mast coming down at 06:45. Despite the severe damage to his sails and rigging, Faulknor then attempted to wear around, successfully bringing Bellona across the French ship's starboard stern quarter and firing a series of raking broadsides. These causes enormous damage to the hull of Courageux, killing and wounding hundreds of sailors and convincing the mortally wounded L'Ambert to strike his colours and surrender at 07:04. Some of the lower deck guns on the French ship had continued firing after the surrender, and Faulknor ordered two further broadsides to be fired into the shattered hull of Courageux to ensure its compliance.

While Bellona and Courageux fought their duel, Brilliant successfully fought off the two French frigates from 06:00 to 07:30, attacked first by Malicieuse and then by Hermine in turn, deliberately preventing them from intervening in the battle between the larger ships. When it became clear that L'Ambert had surrendered, the French frigates made sail and retreated, Brilliant remaining with Bellona and their prize. British losses in the battle numbered six killed and 28 wounded on Bellona and five killed and 16 wounded on Brilliant, while losses on Courageux alone were listed in Faulknor's after action report as the very high figures of 240 killed and 110 wounded. Historian William Laird Clowes considers that this discrepancy was probably the result of differences in British and French tactical doctrine, the French trained to fire at the masts and rigging of an enemy ship in order to disable them, while British doctrine trained crews to fire into the hull of enemy ships to kill the crew.

== Aftermath ==
The captured Courageux was taken to Lisbon under a prize crew, to be greeted by cheering crowds. A later historian wrote "I can only compare the conduct of the Bellona to that of a dextrous gladiator, who not only plants his own blows with certainty, but also guards against those of his antagonist." Writing in 1825, historian Edward Pelham Brenton listed the battle as one of only four decisive encounters between single ships of the line of comparable size in the history of warfare under sail (the others being the Battle of Ushant in 1782 when HMS Foudroyant captured Pégase, the Battle of the Raz de Sein in April 1798, when HMS Mars captured Hercule and the Battle of Pirano in February 1812 when HMS Victorious captured Rivoli). Following repairs, Courageux joined the Royal Navy as HMS Courageux, serving for 35 years and seeing action in the American Revolutionary War and the French Revolutionary Wars before being wrecked in a storm at Monte Hacho on 18 December 1796 with the loss of more than 470 lives.

== Bibliography ==
- Brenton, Edward Pelham (1837) [1825]. The Naval History of Great Britain, Vol. II. London: C. Rice.
- Clowes, William Laird (1997) [1900]. The Royal Navy, A History from the Earliest Times to 1900, Volume III. London: Chatham Publishing. ISBN 1-86176-012-4.
- Grocott, Terence (2002) [1997]. Shipwrecks of the Revolutionary & Napoleonic Era. Caxton Editions. ISBN 1-84067-164-5.
- Shelton, Edward (1867). The Book of Battles. London: Houlston and Wright.
