= Active (1789 ship) =

British merchant and slave ship 1789–1904

History

Great Britain
- Name: Active
- Builder: Bermuda
- Launched: 1789
- Captured: Circa late 1804

General characteristics
- Tons burthen: 127, or 137 (bm)
- Sail plan: Snow
- Complement: 25
- Armament: 14 × 4-pounder guns

Active was launched at Bermuda in 1789. She transferred to Liverpool circa 1798 and then spent a few years as a West Indiaman. Between 1802 and 1803 she made one voyage as a slave ship in the triangular trade in enslaved persons. She was captured off West Africa around late 1804 on her second voyage before she could start acquiring slaves.

== Career ==
Active first appeared in Lloyd's Register (LR) in 1798,

Year	Master	Owner	Trade	Source
1798	T.Davis	M'Burnie	Liverpool-Martinique	LR
1799	T.Davis; R.Johnson	M'Burnie	Liverpool-Martinique	LR
1800	T.Davis; R.Johnson	M'Burnie	Liverpool-Martinique	LR
1801	R.Johnson; W.Wilding	M'Burnie	Liverpool-Martinique; Liverpool–Newfoundland	LR
1802	W.Wilding; J.Noumus	M'Burnie; Newton	Liverpool–Newfoundland; Liverpool–Africa	LR

1st voyage transporting enslaved people (1802–1803):: Captain Isaac Nomus sailed from Liverpool on 4 August 1802. In 1802, 155 vessels sailed from English ports, bound for Africa to acquire and transport enslaved people; 122 of these vessels sailed from Liverpool.

Active arrived at Demerara on 19 December 1802. She sailed from Demerara on 17 March 1803 and arrived back at Liverpool on 12 May. She had left with 22 crew members and she suffered one crew death during the voyage. At some point on the voyage, Captain Robert Hall replaced Nomus.

2nd voyage transporting enslaved people (1803–loss): Captain James Dalrymple acquired a letter of marque on 2 September 1803. Captain John Dalrymple sailed from Liverpool on 26 October. In 1803, 99 vessels sailed from English ports, bound for Africa to acquire and transport enslaved people; 83 of these vessels sailed from Liverpool.

== Fate ==
When Fame arrived at Demerara she brought news that Active, Dalrymple, master, and Prudence, Darby, master, had been captured on the Windward Coast.

In 1804, 30 British vessels in the triangular trade were lost; eight of these vessels were lost off the coast of Africa. During the period 1793 to 1807, war, rather than maritime hazards or resistance by the captives, was the greatest cause of vessel losses among British enslaving vessels.
