= Prudence (1796 ship) =

History

United Kingdom
- Builder: Philadelphia
- Launched: 1796
- Captured: Circa late 1803

General characteristics
- Tons burthen: 123, or 126 (bm)
- Complement: 25
- Armament: 1802:4 × 4-pounder guns; 1803:10 × 4-pounder guns

Prudence was built in Philadelphia in 1796. Between 1801 and 1803 she made two complete voyages from Liverpool as a slave ship in the triangular trade in enslaved people. She was captured around late 1803 on her third voyage before she could purchase captives.

== Voyages transporting enslaved people ==
Prudence first appeared in the Register of Shipping (RS) in 1802.

Year	Master	Owner	Trade	Source
1802	Woodstock	J[ames] & J[ohn] Parr	Liverpool–Africa	RS; small repairs 1801

On 6 January 1802 Prudence, Woodstock, master, sailed for Africa. In 1802, 155 vessels sailed from English ports, bound for Africa to acquire and transport enslaved people; 122 of these vessels sailed from Liverpool.

Prudence acquired captives at Cape Grand Mount and arrived at Kingston on 6 April with 157 captives. Prudence sailed from Kingston on 21 May and arrived back at Liverpool on 5 July. she had left Liverpool with 20 crew members and suffered three crew deaths on the voyage.

Captain James Swanson sailed from Liverpool on 5 September 1802. Prudence began acquiring captives in Africa on 1 November, and sailed from Africa on 3 January 1803. She arrived at Demerara on 10 March. She arrived back at Liverpool on 30 May. She had left Liverpool with 20 crew members and suffered eight crew deaths on the voyage. (Note: Swanson died shortly after his return. In 1803, he returned to his home town of Hawick, in Scotland, and died, either from a "previously contracted virulent fever, or delerium tremens." He was 23 years old.)

Captain Johnathan D'Arcy acquired a letter of marque on 30 July 1803. He sailed from Liverpool on 7 September. In 1803, 99 vessels sailed from English ports, bound for Africa to acquire and transport enslaved people; 83 of these vessels sailed from Liverpool.

== Fate ==
When Fame arrived at Demerara she brought news that Active, Dalrymple, master, and Prudence, Darby, master, had been captured on the Windward Coast.

In 1804, 30 British vessels in the triangular trade were lost; eight of these vessels were lost off the coast of Africa. During the period 1793 to 1807, war, rather than maritime hazards or resistance by the captives, was the greatest cause of vessel losses among British enslaving vessels.
