= Robert Faulknor the younger =

Captain Robert Faulknor the younger
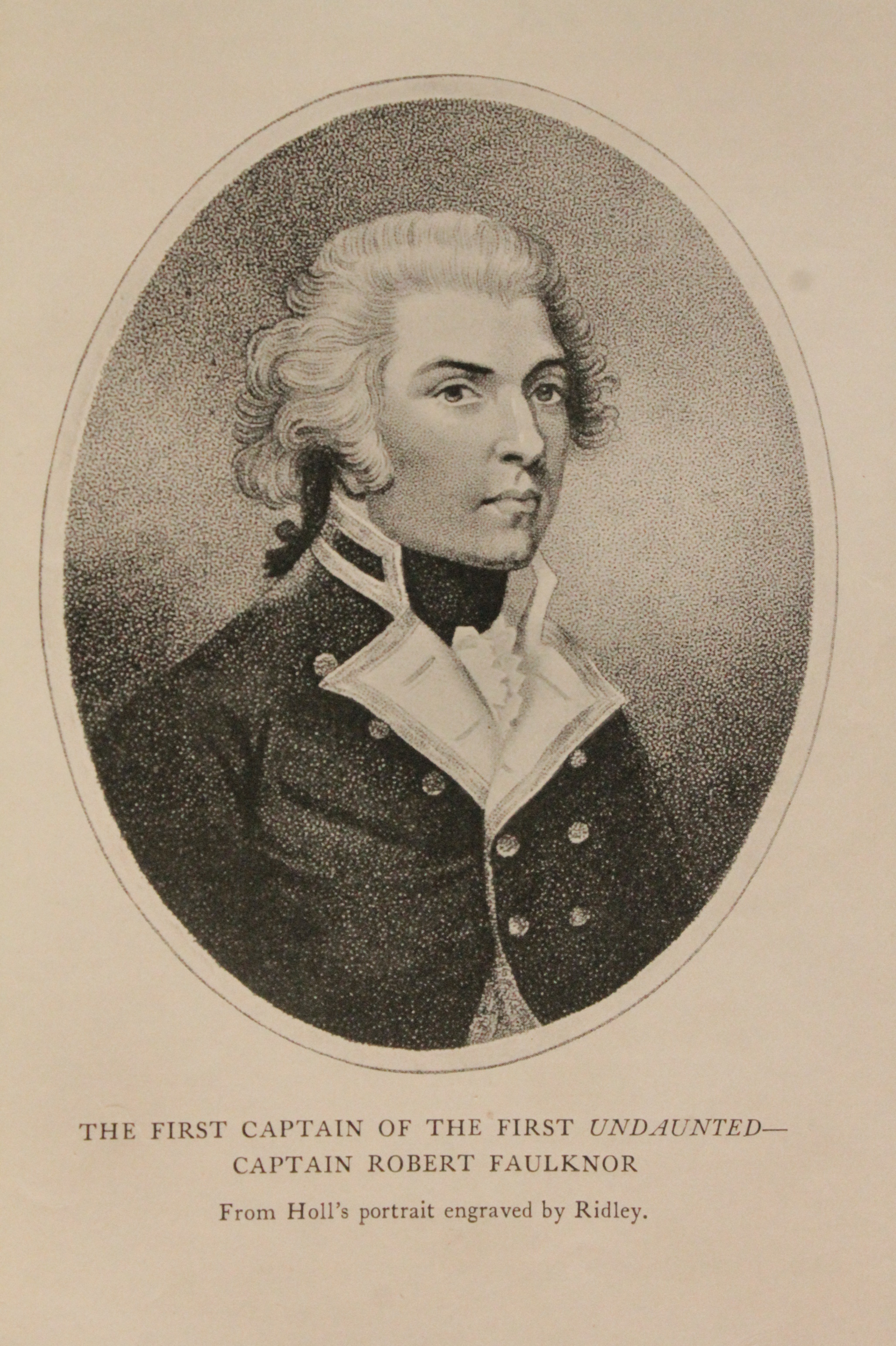
- Printed memorial to Robert Faulknor, by H. D. Gardner, published 1795 (after James Roberts)
- Born: 1763; Northampton
- Died: 1795 (aged 31–32); Off Pointe à Pitre, Guadeloupe
- Relatives: Jonathan Faulknor the elder (brother)
- Military career
- Allegiance: United Kingdom
- Branch: Navy
- Service years: 1777–1795
- Rank: Captain
- Commands: Pluto, Zebra, Rose, Blanche
- Conflicts: American Revolutionary War; War of the First Coalition; West Indies theatre

Robert Faulknor the younger (1763–1795) was an 18th-century Royal Navy officer, part of the Faulknor naval dynasty. He was court-martialled (but acquitted) and died in an action off Guadeloupe in the eastern Caribbean Sea.

== Life ==
=== Early life ===
He was born on the coast of Hampshire, the eldest of the two sons of Robert Faulknor captain of HMS Bellona, and his wife, Elizabeth Ashe. His paternal grandfather had served as flag captain under Admiral John Balchen on HMS Victory the predecessor to its more famous namesake and went down with his ship and 100 men in a shipwreck on 4 October 1744. His great grandfather had served his life at sea then ended as Lt Governor of Greenwich Hospital.

Sometime after that the family moved to Dijon, France, where they stayed until Robert the elder died there on 9 May 1769, when his widow and the children returned to Southampton. Robert and his brother were enrolled in a grammar school, with Robert then entering the Royal Naval Academy, Portsmouth, in 1774, aged eleven.

=== First commissions ===
Robert completed his term at the Academy in March 1777 and joined HMS Isis (50 guns), under the Hon. William Cornwallis, stationed in North America. He then followed Cornwallis to HMS Bristol (50 guns) and then HMS Lion (64 guns), seeing many engagements in 1779/80. From December 1780 to March 1783 Robert served in HMS Princess Royal (98 guns) and HMS Britannia (98 guns), leading Rear-Admiral Sir Joshua Rowley to call him "a young man of great merit." After the American War of Independence, Robert Faulknor was one of a lucky few officers to gain peacetime commissions and was put in command of the sloop HMS Merlin after Britannia's paying-off in March 1783 and then, from December 1783, to HMS Daphne (20 guns).

=== Pluto ===
He was appointed to serve in HMS Impregnable (98 guns) during the Nootka Sound crisis in May 1790 and six months later he was promoted to commander, although it was April 1791 before he got his first command at that rank, (the fireship HMS Pluto). That command ended in September 1791, after which he remained on half pay until the outbreak of the War of the First Coalition against France in 1793.

=== Martinique ===
Capture of Fort Saint Louis, Martinique, 1794, with Asia in the background and HMS Zebra in the foreground

After the outbreak of war, in June 1793, he was placed as commander of the 16-gun sloop-of-war HMS Zebra, firstly stationed in the English Channel and then - through his mother's lobbying of Lord Chatham - attached to Sir John Jervis's expedition to the West Indies.

On the morning of Thursday 20 March 1794 the Zebra was part of a planned attack on Fort Royal and Fort Louis on Martinique. HMS Zebra and the far larger HMS Asia (64 guns) were ordered to give covering fire for the landing of ground troops and seamen (from other smaller ships, under the direct command of Captains Riou and Nugent) by anchoring close under the walls of Fort St Louis.

However Asia twice turned away when coming within range of the French canon. This appeared due to a former French officer on board, who was familiar with Fort Royal, being in charge of the piloting - Lt. de Tourelles. It is unclear if this was due to fear or guilt.

Faulknor was left to attack alone, with his 100 men on the Zebra. Bizarrely his own pilot had the same fear as de Tourelles, and began to turn the sloop away from the enemy. Faulknor approached him and he said he had dreamed he would die, so Faulknor took the wheel himself and sent the man to the rear of the ship, where he was almost instantly hit by a cannonball: the only member of the crew to die. He came closer to the fort than originally planned, and using ladders of bamboo scaled its walls at the head of his men and had a lucky escape when a wooden cartouche (powder cartridge) box strapped to his waist was struck by grapeshot but left him unharmed. His men reached the top of the outer wall and were met with a volley of musket fire which injured only three of the men. They drew their cutlasses ready to attack, but the French turned and fled into the main fortress.

The main gate was easily forced and within seven minutes they reached the upper platform of the fortress, causing the governor to surrender. Jervis watched the French flag atop the fortress replaced by the British ensign. Capture of the fort also brought the capture of the frigate "Bienvenue" anchored alongside.

The 500 marines, under Captain Edward Riou and Captain Nugent, were given entry to the fort by Faulknor's second-in-command, Lt. Hill, who lowered the drawbridge.

Jervis witnessed Faulknor's action from HMS Boyne sitting beyond the range of the cannon fire. As the Zebra passed the stern of the Boyne to go back to its position in the fleet, Jervis's band played See, the Conqu'ring Hero Comes and the whole crew cheered his actions. Jervis then called Faulknor on board, embraced him and promoted him to captain on the spot.

He was given immediate command of the frigate he had captured at the fort which was rechristened as HMS Undaunted.

Capture of Fort Louis brought with it control of the town and harbour of Fort Royal. This in domino effect brought about the surrender of Fort Bourbon by General Rochambeau, and from that the capture of the entire island of Martinique.

His command of the Undaunted was short-lived and he was moved to be captain of the far smaller frigate HMS Rose. He then took command of the slightly heavier frigate HMS Blanche (32 guns) several months later, (as the expedition moved to attack the island of Guadeloupe).

=== Court martial ===
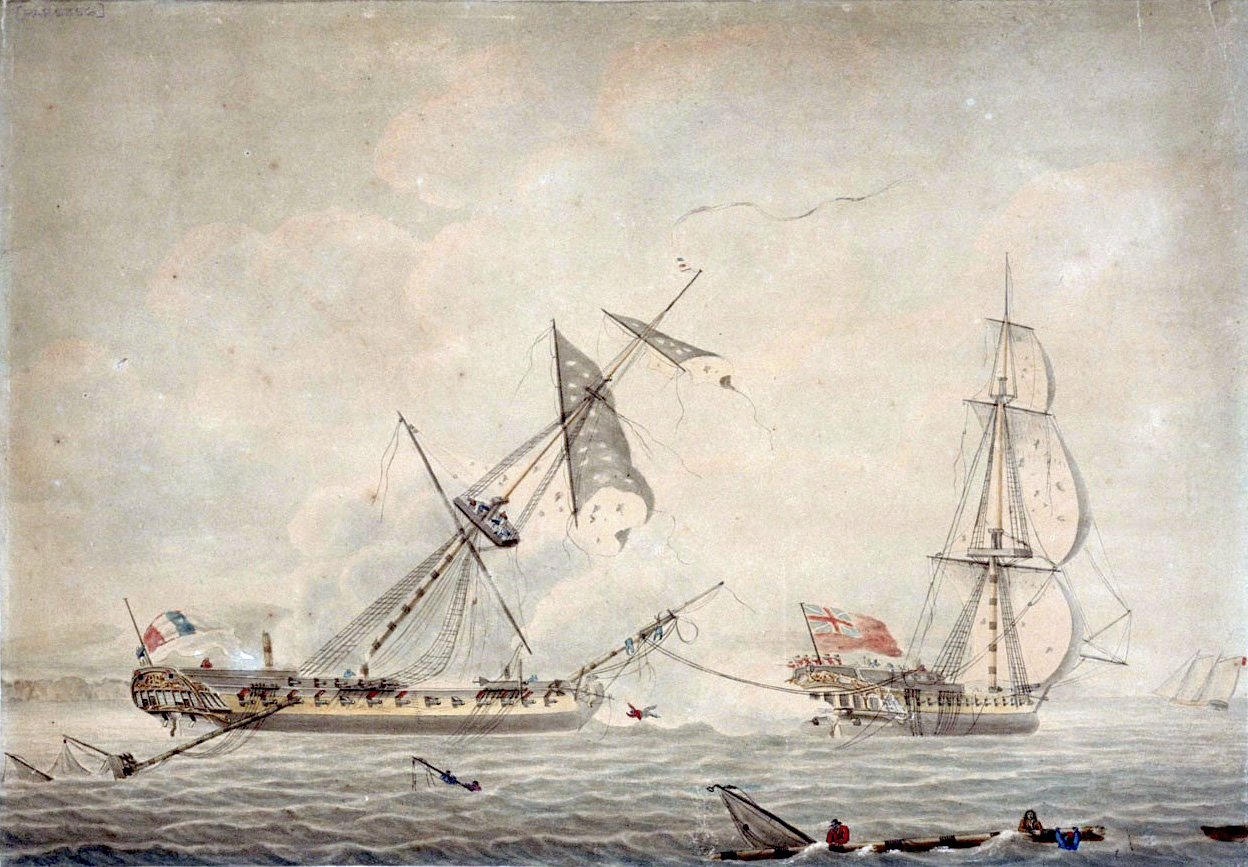
The capture of the Pique by HMS Blanche

On 21 April 1794 he led a party of his seamen during the attack on Fort Fleur d'Epée on Guadeloupe. He was attacked by two French soldiers, lost his sword and knocked to the ground. Midshipman John Maitland fought off the French and Faulknor was finally rescued by his own men. During the attack on Guadeloupe, Faulknor became involved in an angry altercation with an engineer who had criticised the battery erected by Faulknor's men, during which he killed the quartermaster from HMS Boyne, and Jervis's flagship), with his sword for making some form of contemptuous comment.

Faulknor's own seamen working on the battery, immediately refused to serve under him. A mutiny was only averted by the intercession of other officers and by Faulknor's immediate court martial, at which he was acquitted. Faulknor was remorseful, but maintained that he had been provoked, and for the rest of his life he was morose and restless, pacing his cabin at night. Waiting for his court martial, he wrote to Lieutenant Hill of Zebra that he was less concerned "for my own fate, than [for] that of being accessory to the death of any human being not the natural enemy of myself or my country ... the hasty and sudden punishment I unhappily inflicted on the spot will be a source of lasting affliction to my mind."

=== Death ===
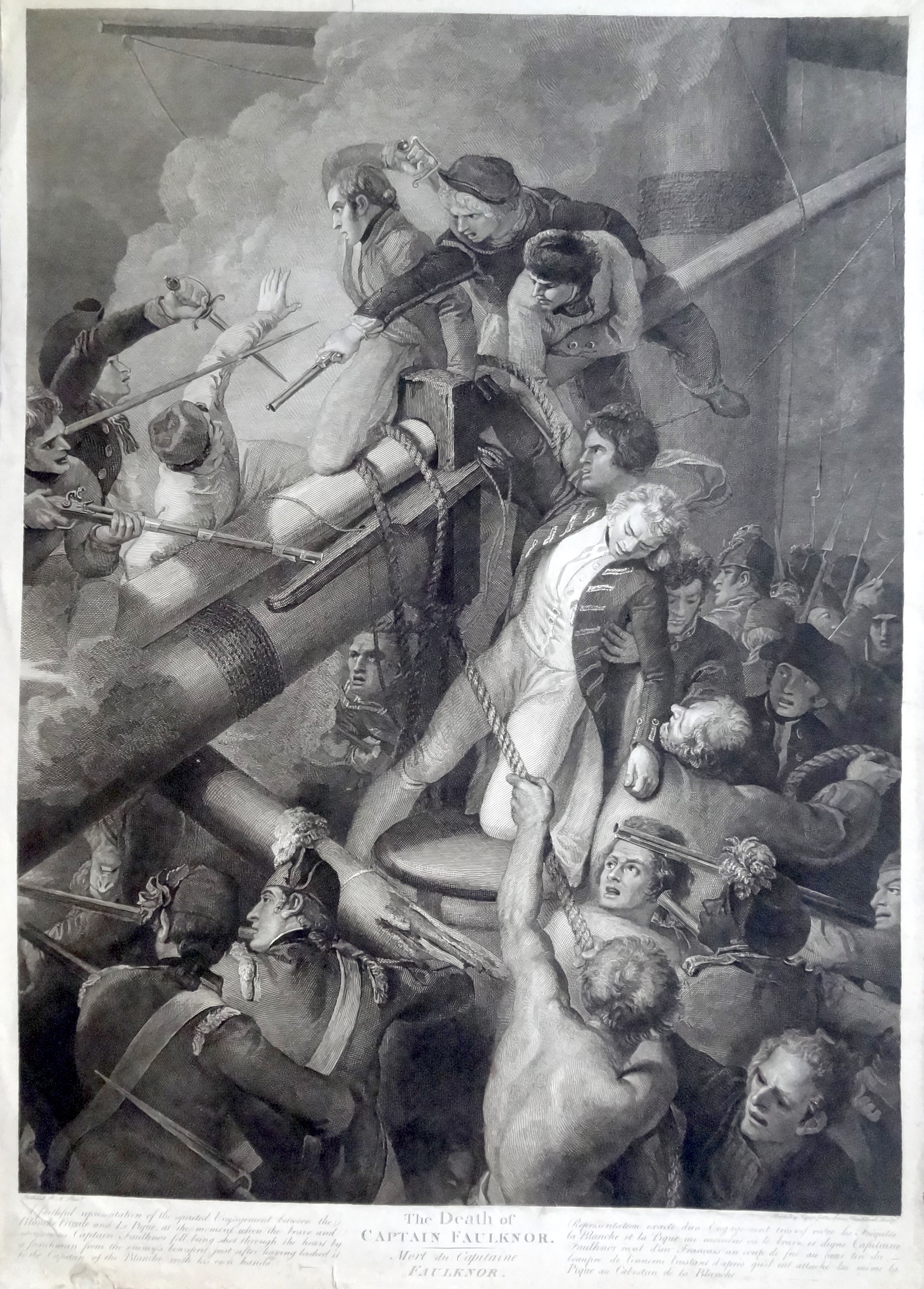
The death in action of Captain Robert Faulknor on January 5, 1795 during the engagement between the Frigate Blanche and the Frigate Pique - Guadeloupe

Faulknor and the 32-gun HMS Blanche were dispatched in December 1794 to cruise off the French-held island of Desirade in the West Indies.

On 4 January 1795, Blanche's crew discovered the 36-gun French frigate Pique off Pointe à Pitre, Guadeloupe. The French ship at first seemed to be trying to avoid an action, but the two ships eventually came to close quarters just after midnight in the early hours of 5 January, in an engagement of over 3¾ hours in which Blanche lost her main and mizzen masts.

One and a quarter hours in, Pique ran her bow on board Blanche, making her unable to bring any of her guns to bear on Blanche and (once the English crew had rapidly lashed the French ship's bowsprit to the remains of Blanche's main mast) unable to manoeuvre. Faulknor was wounded by an initial musket shot, but continued to direct the action until around 3am when a second musket shot struck his heart and killed him. Lieutenant Frederick Watkins took over command. Two hours later at 5am the Pique surrendered.

Faulknor was buried the day after his death 6 January 1795 on the Isles des Saintes. There is a memorial to him within St Paul's Cathedral.

== Recognition ==
Following news of his death reaching London, a public subscription led to the erection of a memorial in St Paul's Cathedral, London.

== Sources ==
- DNB
- Tracy, Nicholas (2006). Who's who in Nelson's Navy: 200 Naval Heroes. London: Chatham Publishing. ISBN 1-86176-244-5.
- The Gentleman's Magazine. F. Jefferies. 1837.
