= Donald C. Thompson (admiral) =

United States Coast Guard vice admiral (1930–2022)

D. C. Thompson
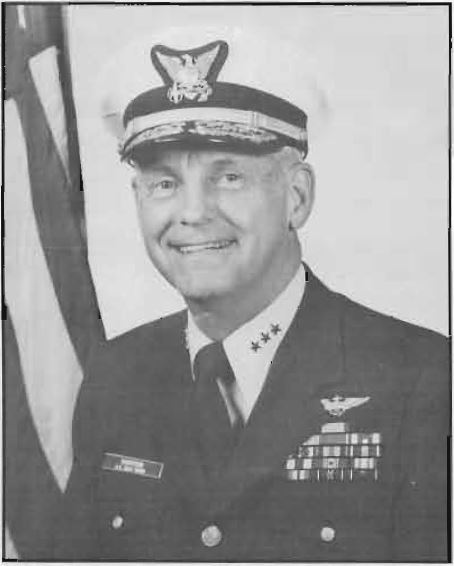
- Born: November 9, 1930; Hollis, New York, U.S.
- Died: August 21, 2022 (aged 91) Wilmington, North Carolina, U.S.
- Allegiance: United States of America
- Branch: United States Coast Guard
- Service years: 1952–1988
- Rank: Vice admiral

Donald C. Thompson (November 9, 1930 – August 21, 2022), also known as Deese Thompson, was a United States Coast Guard vice admiral. He served as Commander of the Coast Guard Atlantic Area and US Maritime Defense Zone Atlantic.
