= Fame (1816 ship) =

History

United Kingdom
- Name: Fame
- Builder: J.S. Scott, Fort Gloster, Calcutta, or Budge Budge
- Launched: 1816
- Fate: Wrecked July 1822

General characteristics
- Tons burthen: 629, or 637 (bm)

Fame was built in 1816 at Calcutta. She traded between Britain and India and was wrecked in 1822.

She was listed as being registered at Calcutta in 1819 with W. Eastgate, master, and Palmer & Co., owners. Lloyd's Register (LR) for 1822 showed her with Eastgate, master, Paxton & Co., owners, and trade London–Calcutta.

On 14 June 1822, Fame, Clark, master, wrecked at Sea Point, Table Bay, on passage from Calcutta and Madras for London. Four passengers, four seamen, and some invalided soldiers drowned.
