= HMS Zebra (1780) =

British sloop-of-war (1780–1812

- Zebra (centre-left) at the Battle of Martinique

History

Great Britain
- Name: HMS Zebra
- Ordered: 6 August 1779
- Builder: William Cleverley, Gravesend
- Laid down: October 1779
- Launched: 31 August 1780
- Completed: 11 November 1780
- Commissioned: August 1780
- Reclassified: Bomb vessel in 1798
- Honours and awards: Participated in: First Battle of Copenhagen; Second Battle of Copenhagen; Naval General Service Medal with clasps: "Zebra 17 March 1794"; "17 Mar. Boat Service 1794"; "Copenhagen 1801"
- Fate: Sold on 13 August 1812

General characteristics
- Class & type: Zebra-class sloop
- Tons burthen: 320 7/94 (bm)
- Length: 98 ft 1/2 in (29.9 m) (overall); 80 ft 1 3/4 in (24.4 m) (keel)
- Beam: 27 ft 5 1/4 in (8.4 m)
- Depth of hold: 13 ft 4 in (4.1 m)
- Complement: As sloop: 125; As bomb vessel: 67
- Armament: As sloop: 16 × 6-pounder guns + 12 × 1/2-pounder swivels; 2 × 4-pounder guns (added in 1790); As bomb vessel: 8 × 24-pounder carronades + 2 × 6-pounder guns + 1 × 10" mortar + 1 × 13-inch mortar

HMS Zebra was a 16-gun (later 18-gun) Zebra-class sloop of the Royal Navy, launched on 31 August 1780 at Gravesend. She was the second ship to bear the name. After twenty years of service, including involvement in the West Indies campaigns during the French Revolutionary Wars, she was converted into a bomb vessel in 1798. In this capacity she took part in attacks on French ports, and was present at both battles of Copenhagen. The Navy sold her in 1812.

== American Revolution ==
Zebra was built to a design by Edward Hunt, and launched and commissioned in August 1780 under Commander John Bourchier. She then served in the Downs Squadron during the closing stages of the American Revolutionary War. On 10 February 1781 she was in company with Juno when they captured the American privateer Revenge.

Then around 10 May she was in company with the sloop Martin and the cutters Flying Fish and Busy when they recaptured the Industry, Chew, master, and the Jenny, Dane, master. Zebra sent them into Dover.

Zebra sailed for Jamaica on 10 February 1782. On 14 April 1782 Zebra was with Admiral Sir George Brydges Rodney, the commander-in chief of the Leeward Islands station, at the Battle of the Saintes. She was in Rear-Admiral Sir Samuel Hood's division. During fleet engagements, only large ships-of-the-line of over 50 guns traditionally took part in the battles and the small Zebra did not participate in a battle. Smaller vessels like Zebra would be used to relay messages, tow damaged ships out of the line or rescue seaman.

On 28 June Zebra, under the command of Commander John Loncraft, was in company with Princess Caroline when they captured the American privateer Tartar. Late in 1782 Zebra and Nonsuch escorted a fleet from Georgia "with the principal inhabitants, their Negroes, and their Effects" to Jamaica.

On 19 January 1783 Zebra captured the brig Providence on the Leeward Islands. Commander E. Pakenham took command in April 1783 in the Leeward Islands. She returned from the West Indies to the UK after 1783.

From January to October 1786 she underwent repairs at Woolwich. Commander C. Boyles commissioned her 1787. Then between April and May 1789 she underwent fitting for service it the Channel. Zebra was recommissioned in August under Commander the Honourable Robert Forbes. In November 1790 she came under the command of Commander William Brown and sailed for the Mediterranean on 22 November. From April to July 1793 she was back at Woolwich for repairs.

== French Revolutionary Wars ==
=== Sloop ===
In June 1793 Commander Robert Faulknor recommissioned Zebra. He sailed her for the Leeward Islands on 26 November.

In 1794, Zebra participated in the capture of Martinique by the expeditionary force under the command of Admiral Sir John Jervis and Lieutenant General Sir Charles Grey.

In February 1794 the British attacked Martinique. By 20 March, only Fort Bourbon and Fort Royal still held out. Jervis ordered the third rate ship of the line HMS Asia (64 guns), and the Zebra to take Fort Saint Louis. Asia was unable to get close, and so Commander Faulknor went in without Asia's help. Despite facing heavy fire, Faulknor ran Zebra close under the walls. He and his ship's company then used Zebra's boats to land. The British stormed the fort and captured it. Zebra lost only her pilot killed and four men wounded. Meanwhile the boats of the British fleet captured Fort Royal and two days later Fort Bourbon capitulated.

Jervis promoted Faulknor to post-captain and gave him command of the French 28-gun sixth-rate frigate Bienvenue, which the British had captured at Fort Royal and which Jervis renamed Undaunted in Faulknor's honour. In 1847, the feat earned the remaining survivors of Zebra's crew the Naval General Service Medal with the clasp "Zebra 17 March 1794". The crew also qualified for the clasp "17 Mar. Boat Service 1794" for the capture of the French frigate Bienvenue and other vessels in Fort Royal Bay.

In March Commander Richard Bowen replaced Faulknor, only to be replaced in April by Lieutenant Lancelot Skynner. Commander George Vaughn replaced Skynner within the month. On 14 April 1794 Zebra was present at the capture of Basse-Terre, Guadeloupe.

Zebra returned to Fort Royal on 4 December with the French schooner Carmagnols, which she had taken on 30 November off Saint Lucia. Carmangnole had a crew of 35 men and was armed with 10 guns. French records show that Carmagnole was a schooner that the French Navy had commissioned in 1793 at Guadeloupe. Zebra had taken her after having run her ashore on La Désirade.

The captures of Martinique, Guadeloupe and Saint Lucia yielded prize money for the captains and crews of the vessels involved, and for the army units. (Note: As Captain, Faulknor received £150 0s 1 3/4d as his share of the prize money for the capture of Martinique. Subsequent captains received £24 0s 11 1/2d for Guadeloupe and £29 10s 3 1/4d for Saint Lucia. A seaman who had been on Zebra for all three campaigns would have received a total of £1 0s 10d, inclusive of 15s 4 3/4d for Martinique. A later, further distribution netted Faulknor £29 6s 8 1/2d, and his successors £12 9s 1 1/4d and £9 7s 2 1/4d. A seaman at all three campaigns netted an additional 5s 2 1/4d. A third distribution netted a captain at Martinique £695 16s 8 3/4d. It is not clear whether Faulknor was considered a captain or not for this service. A commissioned officer received £94 19s 11 3/4d for being present at all three campaigns; a seaman received £3 13s 4 3/4d. The total for a seaman would have been about three months' wages.)

Early in 1795, Zebra, under Captain Skinner, supported the British Army in suppressing an insurrection by the indigenous Caribs on St Vincent. Then Mermaid captured the 10-gun Brutus off Grenada on 10 October 1795, followed by the 18-gun French corvette Républicaine on 14 October 1795. Zebra, under the command of Commander Norborne Thompson, shared in the prize money by agreement.

In January 1796, Commander David M'Iver assumed command. Shortly thereafter, Alarm and Zebra captured a privateer and recaptured two schooners. On 12 September Zebra, under Commander John Hurst, captured the Victoire between Grenada and Tobago. Victoire was armed with six guns and had a crew of 65 men. She was eight days out of Guadeloupe and had captured a sloop from Barbados with a cargo of provisions for Martinique. Lapwing had recaptured the sloop off Marie-Galante. At some point Zebra captured the Spanish ship Santa Maria Magdalena.

Early in 1797 Admiral Henry Harvey sent Zebra to Tobago to gather a detachment of troops. Zebra then rendezvoused with Harvey and his flotilla at the island of Carriacou, in the Grenadines, for the invasion of Trinidad. The flotilla sailed from Carriacou on 15 February and arrived off Port of Spain on the 16th. At Port of Spain they found a Spanish squadron consisting of four ships of the line and a frigate, all under the command of Rear-Admiral Don Sebastian Ruiz de Apodaca. Harvey sent Zebra and some of the other smaller ships to protect the transports and anchored his own ships of the line opposite the Spanish squadron. At 2am on 17 February the British discovered that four of the five Spanish vessels were on fire; they were able to capture the 74-gun San Domaso but the others were destroyed. (Note: The five Spanish ships were San Vincente (Captain Don Geronimo Mendoza; 84 guns), Gallardo (Captain Don Gabriel Sororido; 74 guns), Arrogante (Captain Don Raphael Benasa; 74 guns), San Damaso (Don Tores Jordan; 74 guns), and Santa Cecilia (Captain Don Manuel Urtesabel; 36 guns).) Later that morning General Sir Ralph Abercrombie landed the troops. The Governor of Trinidad, José Maria Chacón, surrendered the next day. Zebra shared with the rest of the flotilla in the allocation of £40,000 for the proceeds of the ships taken at Trinidad and of the property found on the island.

Hurst died in March 1797. It is not clear who sailed Zebra back to Britain for paying off and laying up.

=== Bomb vessel ===
Between March and April 1798, Wells & Co. converted Zebra to a bomb vessel at a cost of £4,319. She then spent April through June at Deptford Dockyard undergoing a full conversion, which cost £7,392. Commander Thomas Sparke recommissioned her in April.

On 28 August 1799 Zebra was with the British fleet that captured the Dutch hulks Drotchterland and Brooderschap, and the ships Helder, Venus, Minerva, and Hector, in the Nieuwe Diep, in Holland. (Note: A partial pay-out of prize money resulted in a payment of 6s 8d to each seaman that had been in the fleet that day.) The capture of these vessels was part of the Anglo-Russian invasion of Holland and preceded by two days the Vlieter Incident in which a large part of the navy of the Batavian Republic, commanded by Rear-Admiral Samuel Story, surrendered to the British navy on a sandbank near the Channel known as De Vlieter, near Wieringen. Zebra was also among the vessels sharing in the prize money from the Dutch vessels of the Vlieter Incident.

In December 1799 Zebra was under Commander Edward Sneyd Clay in the North Sea. Zebra's, next major campaign was the Battle of Copenhagen in 1801. She suffered no casualties. In 1847, Zebra's surviving crew qualified to receive the Naval General Service Medal with the clasp "Copenhagen 1801".

== Napoleonic Wars ==
Between March and May 1803 Zebra underwent another fitting out at Woolwich. Commander William Beauchamp-Proctor was appointed to command of her in April 1803.

On 20 July 1804, Zebra was in the company of hired armed cutter Favorite and some other vessels when Zebra captured Shepherdess. Nine days later, Zebra, captured Postillion.

In July and August 1804 Zebra participated in the squadron under Captain Robert Dudley Oliver in HMS Melpomene at the bombardment of French vessels at Le Havre. The bomb vessels' shells and carcasses set the town on fire on 23 July. On 1 August, the vessels kept a continuous fire for three hours. Still, it is not clear that the bombardment did much damage to the French flotilla. On 31 July the squadron did capture the French vessel Papillon.

Zebra was recommissioned in August 1804 under Commander William Parkinson. Lieutenant George Harris replaced him in 1805. His replacement, in March 1806, was Commander Thomas Whinyates. (Note: For more on Thomas Whinyates see: O'Byrne, William R. (1849). "Whinyates, Thomas" . A Naval Biographical Dictionary. London: John Murray.) Under Whinyates Zebra was on the North Sea station. Commander William Bowles took over in 1807.

Zebra then returned to Copenhagen for the second battle of Copenhagen in 1807. Zebra joined the "Advanced Squadron", which was protecting the batteries the British were building to support their attack on the city. On 17 August, the bomb vessels opened fire on the city's flotilla of row boats whose fire was harassing the left of the British line. Zebra was one of several vessels sharing in the capture of the Danish merchant vessel Sally on 22 August. Zebra was one of six British warships that shared in the capture on 23 August of the Danish vessel Speculation.

On 2 September, the bomb vessels joined the land-based mortar batteries in bombarding Copenhagen. The bombardment set the town on fire and the Danes finally asked for an armistice on 5 September. The prize money for Copenhagen to an ordinary seaman was £3 8s.

On 20 June 1808, Zebra was in the Baltic, under the command of Thomas R. Toker, when she captured the Danish sloop Emenzius. Commander George Trollope took command in January 1809.

== Fate ==
Zebra was laid up in May 1809 at Deptford. She was put up for sale on 13 August 1812. She was sold there at that time.
