= Norborne Thompson =

Vice-Admiral Norborne Thompson
- Born: c. 1769
- Died: 28 May 1844; Great Russell Street, Bloomsbury
- Military career
- Allegiance: United Kingdom
- Branch: Royal Navy
- Service years: 1778–1841
- Rank: Vice-Admiral
- Commands: HMS Zebra; HMS Savage; HMS Minotaur; HMS Perlen; HMS Foudroyant; HMS Bombay; HMS Aboukir; HMS Revenge
- Conflicts: French Revolutionary Wars; Napoleonic Wars; Walcheren Campaign

Norborne Thompson (c.1769 – 28 May 1844) was an officer of the Royal Navy.

== Life ==
Thompson was born circa 1769. He was made a lieutenant in 1790, serving on the 98-gun HMS Boyne at the attack on Pointe-à-Pitre on Guadeloupe, the Caribbean in 1794. He was made commander on 25 March 1796 and later that year put in command of the sloop HMS Zebra, and later the 16-gun HMS Savage. Savage was part of Sir Home Popham's squadron at Ostend, in May 1798. Thompson was made post-captain on 11 August 1800, commanding in turn the 74-gun HMS Minotaur and then the 38-gun frigate HMS Perlen, in which ship he assisted at the reduction of Flushing in 1809 during the Walcheren Campaign. He is also recorded as captain of HMS Foudroyant in 1807, part of the blockade off the coast of Portugal just before the Peninsular War.

In 1813, Thompson transferred from HMS Bombay to take over as captain of HMS Aboukir whilst the latter ship was still on station in the Mediterranean. Aboukir remained on station in the Mediterranean, taking part in the capture of Genoa in April 1814 before returning to Chatham after Napoleon's defeat later that year and being decommissioned by 1816. He was in command of HMS Revenge c.1827, on the home station. He was promoted to the rank of rear-admiral in 1830, and to that of vice-admiral in 1841. He died at the age of 75 on 28 May 1844 at Great Russell Street, Bloomsbury.
