= French ship Bienvenue (1788) =

French warship

History

France
- Name: Royalist, Bienvenue
- Builder: Gouet and Deros
- Launched: 7 May 1788
- Renamed: October 1792, January 1793
- Captured: 20 March 1794

Great Britain
- Name: HMS Undaunted
- Renamed: 30 March 1795
- Fate: Sold

General characteristics As built
- Class & type: 20-gun flûte
- Tons burthen: 699 tons bm
- Length: 42.2 m (138 ft)
- Beam: 10.1 m (33 ft)
- Depth: 4.9 m (16 ft)
- Sail plan: Full-rigged ship
- Armament: 20 × 8-pounders (livre de Paris)^{[a]}

General characteristics British service
- Class & type: 28-gun sixth-rate frigate
- Complement: 195

Bienvenue was a 20-gun French warship launched at Le Havre in 1788 that made several changes in ownership and name during military conflict with the British. She briefly became Royaliste in October 1792 before reverting to her original name in January the following year. She was serving as a prison ship at Martinique when she was captured by the British in 1794.

== Construction ==
Bienvenue was a 20-gun French flûte designed by Pierre-Alexandre-Laurent Forfait and built by the renowned French ship builders Gouet and Deros.^{[b]} She was constructed in the port of Le Havre on the north coast of France between November 1787 and June 1788, and launched on 7 May 1788. She was 699 tons burthen and her French measurements, as built were; 130 ft (length) x 31 ft (beam) x 15 ft 7in (depth).^{[c]} This equates to the modern metric dimensions of 42.2 m (138 ft) x 10.1 m (33 ft) x 4.9 m (16 ft). Initially Bienvenue was armed with 20 × 8-pounders (livre de Paris)^{[a]}

== Career (France) ==
After setting sail from Mauritius for France in December 1791, Bienvenue was seized by her crew, handed over to the British and renamed. She was retaken by the French Royalist forces on 4 October 1792 at St Kitts and was renamed Royaliste; her original name was restored in January 1793. She served as a prison ship at Martinique from July that year until she was recaptured by the British.

== Martinique ==
On 5 February 1794, a British fleet under Sir John Jervis and escorting 7,000 troops under Sir Charles Grey, arrived at the island of Martinique. In spite of the strong opposition from the occupying forces and difficult terrain, the island was substantially under British control by 28 February, save for two forts covering the town of Fort Royal. A siege was subsequently conducted by both British Army and Royal Navy forces, supported by gunfire from Jervis' fleet which was now occupying the harbour.

On the morning of Thursday 20 March 1794, Bienvenue was moored between Fort St Louis and the town of Fort Royal on Martinique. The fort came under attack from HMS Zebra and the far larger HMS Asia (64 guns) who were ordered to give covering fire for the landing of 500 marines (from other smaller ships) who were under the direct command of Captains Edward Riou and Charles Nugent. Only the smaller Zebra, commanded by Robert Faulknor, got through and he led a heroic charge with only 100 men on the fort capturing it in seven minutes.

Admiral Jervis witnessed Faulknor's action from HMS Boyne sitting beyond the range of the cannon fire. As the Zebra passed the stern of the Boyne to go back to her position in the fleet, Jervis's band played See, the Conqu'ring Hero Comes and the whole crew cheered his actions. Jervis then called Faulknor on board, embraced him and promoted him to captain on the spot. Faulknor was given immediate command of the Bienvenue.

== Career (Great Britain) ==
She was subsequently commanded by Captain James Carpenter, then on 4 May she was handed to the newly promoted post-captain, Henry William Bayntun.

The ship was later taken to England, arriving at Sheerness on 24 September. She was registered and renamed HMS Undaunted 30 March 1795 and sold at Deptford on 24 July having served only 16 months as a British ship.

== Notes ==
a The livre poids de marc or livre de Paris was a French measure of mass equivalent to approximately 489.5 grams. It was used from the 1350s to the late 18th century when it was superseded by the livre métrique.

b Not to be confused with Fluyt. The French Flûte was a warship with an unarmed lower deck which could be used for storage and troop carrying. Often the lower deck had sealed gunports so additional armament could be carried if required.

c Not to be confused with Imperial measurements
