= HMS Blanche (1786) =

32-gun Hermione-class fifth rate of the Royal Navy

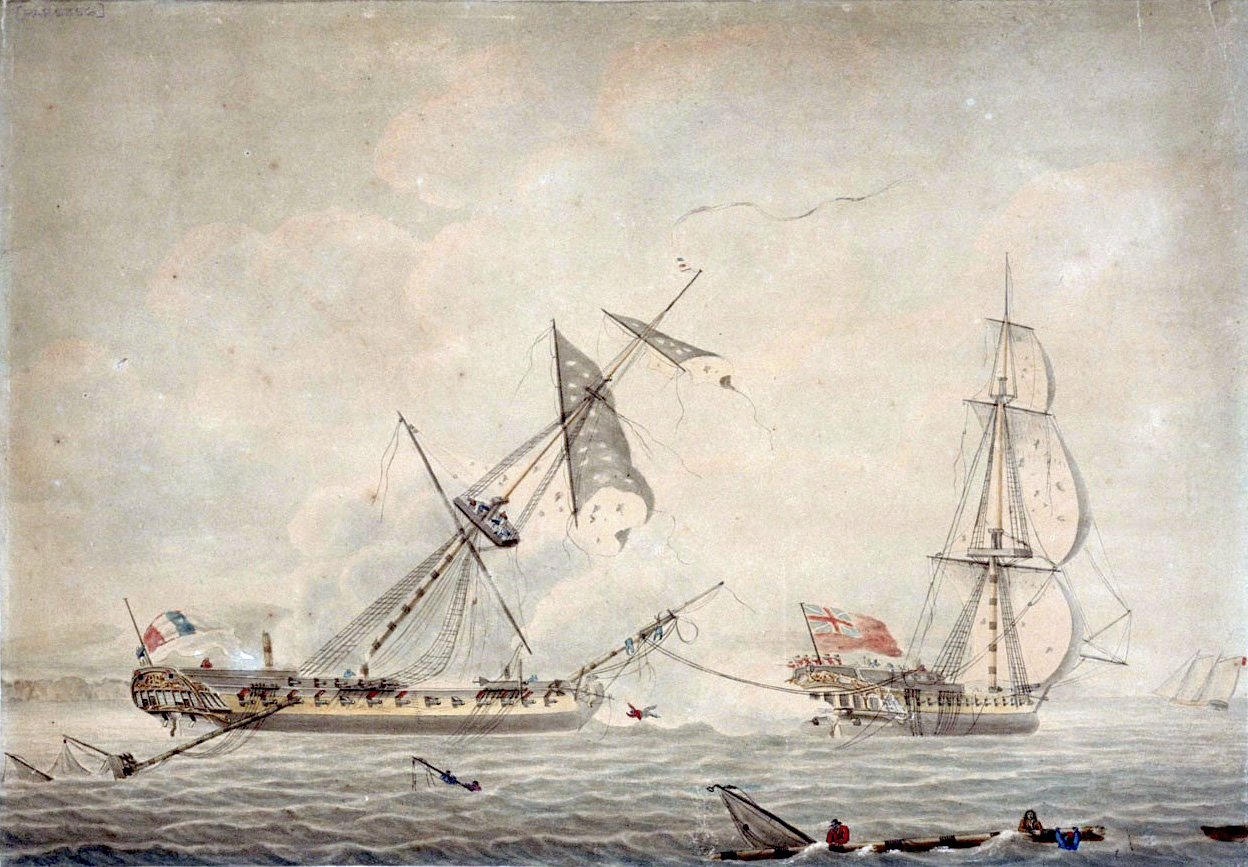
- HMS Blanche tows the captured Pique into port, depicted by Robert Dodd

History

Great Britain
- Name: HMS Blanche
- Ordered: 9 August 1782
- Builder: Thomas Calhoun & John Nowlan, Bursledon
- Laid down: July 1783
- Launched: 10 July 1786
- Completed: By 25 April 1789
- Honours and awards: Naval General Service Medal with clasp "Blanche 4 Jany. 1795"
- Fate: Ran aground on 28 September 1799; Declared a total loss

General characteristics
- Class & type: 32-gun Hermione-class fifth rate
- Tons burthen: 722 48/94 bm
- Length: 129 ft (39.3 m) (overall); 107 ft 0 1/2 in (32.6 m) (keel)
- Beam: 35 ft 7 1/2 in (10.9 m)
- Depth of hold: 12 ft 7 in (3.84 m)
- Propulsion: Sails
- Sail plan: Full-rigged ship
- Complement: 220
- Armament: Upper deck: 26 × 12-pounder guns; QD: 4 × 6-pounder guns + 4 × 18-pounder carronades; Fc: 2 × 6-pounder guns + 2 × 18-pounder carronades

HMS Blanche was a 32-gun Hermione-class fifth rate of the Royal Navy. She was ordered towards the end of the American War of Independence, but only briefly saw service before the outbreak of the French Revolutionary Wars in 1793. She enjoyed a number of successful cruises against privateers in the West Indies, before coming under the command of Captain Robert Faulknor. He took the Blanche into battle against a superior opponent and after a hard-fought battle, forced the surrender of the French frigate Pique.

Faulknor was among those killed on the Blanche. She subsequently served in the Mediterranean, where she had the misfortune of forcing a large Spanish frigate to surrender, but was unable to secure the prize, which then escaped. Returning to British waters she was converted to a storeship and then a troopship, but did not serve for long before being wrecked off the Texel in 1799.

== Construction and commissioning ==
Blanche was ordered from the yards of Thomas Calhoun and John Nowlan, of Bursledon on 9 August 1782 and laid down there in July the following year. She was launched on 10 July 1786 and proceeded to Portsmouth where she was coppered in August. She was then laid up for some time, before commissioning in January 1789. Work to fit her for sea had been completed by 25 April that year.

== Career ==
Blanche's first period of service took her to the Leeward Islands in May 1789, under the command of Captain Robert Murray, but she had returned to Britain by June 1792, when she was paid off. A brief period of refitting at Deptford lasted from July to October, before she returned to the Leeward Islands under the command of Captain Christopher Parker. Parker undertook several successful cruises while in the West Indies in 1793, capturing the 12-gun Vengeur on 1 October, the 20-gun Revolutionnaire on 8 October and the 22-gun Sans Culotte on 30 December. Command of the Blanche passed to Captain Robert Faulknor in 1794, who continued Parker's work by capturing a large schooner at La Désirade on 30 December 1794, with the loss of two killed and four wounded.

=== Battling the Pique ===
Faulknor then proceeded to patrol off Pointe à Pitre, Guadeloupe, where the 36-gun French frigate Pique was known to be refitting. The French ship came out of the harbour on 4 January 1795, and the two frigates spent several hours manoeuvring and circling each other, trying to gain an advantage. The battle started early on the morning of 5 January, with the two ships closing and exchanging broadsides, before Pique turned and ran afoul of Blanche, with her bowsprit caught across her port quarter. While the French made several attempts to board, which were repulsed, the crew of Blanche attempted to lash the bowsprit to their capstan, but during the attempt Captain Faulknor was killed by a musket ball to the heart. Pique then broke away from Blanche and came round her stern, this time colliding on the starboard quarter. Blanche's men quickly lashed the bowsprit to the stump of their mainmast, which held her fast. Heavy volleys of musket fire were now exchanged between the two ships, while the men of Blanche attempted to manoeuvre their guns into a position to fire on the trapped Frenchman. They eventually had to blow away part of Blanche's woodwork to achieve this. They now raked the Pique until she was forced to surrender, over five hours since the battle had begun. Casualties for the British were eight killed, including Captain Faulknor, and 21 wounded. Pique had lost 76 killed and 110 wounded. The two ships were joined later that morning by the 64-gun HMS Veteran, which helped exchange and secure the prisoners and tow the ships to port. Pique was taken into the Royal Navy, as HMS Pique. In 1847 the Admiralty authorized the award of the Naval General Service Medal with clasp "Blanche 4 Jany. 1795" to all surviving claimants from the action.

=== Later career ===
Captain Charles Sawyer took command of Blanche in January 1795. She captured a small privateer off Saint Lucia on 17 April. Blanche returned to Portsmouth for a refit in late 1795, before sailing to the Mediterranean in December.

In 1796 a court martial dismissed Sawyer from his vessel and from the service. Sawyer had lost control of Blanche and the respect of his crew due to his increasingly blatant homosexual relations with two young midshipmen, his coxswain, and another seaman. Blanche's first lieutenant, Archibald Cowan, eventually wrote to Captain George Cockburn, senior captain of the fleet. The charges were "odious misconduct, and for not taking public notice of mutinous expressions muttered against him"; the court martial dismissed Sawyer from His Majesty's service on 17 October 1796, ruling that he was "incapable of ever serving in any military capacity whatever."

Even before the court martial verdict, Admiral John Jervis in June placed Blanche under the command of Captain D’Arcy Preston. On 19 December Blanche was involved in an action with HMS Minerve against the Spanish frigates Santa Sabina and Ceres. The Minerve captured Santa Sabina, but though the Blanche forced Ceres to surrender, she was unable to secure her prize, which subsequently escaped.

Command passed to Captain Henry Hotham in 1797. On 5 February 1797 she and HMS Inconstant captured American merchantman "Fortune" 4 leagues off Marseilles while bound for Genoa. She was seized for suspected trading with France and suspicious papers. She captured the 14-gun privateer Coureur on the Lisbon station on 20 November, followed by the 6-gun privateer Bayonnais on 27 December that year.

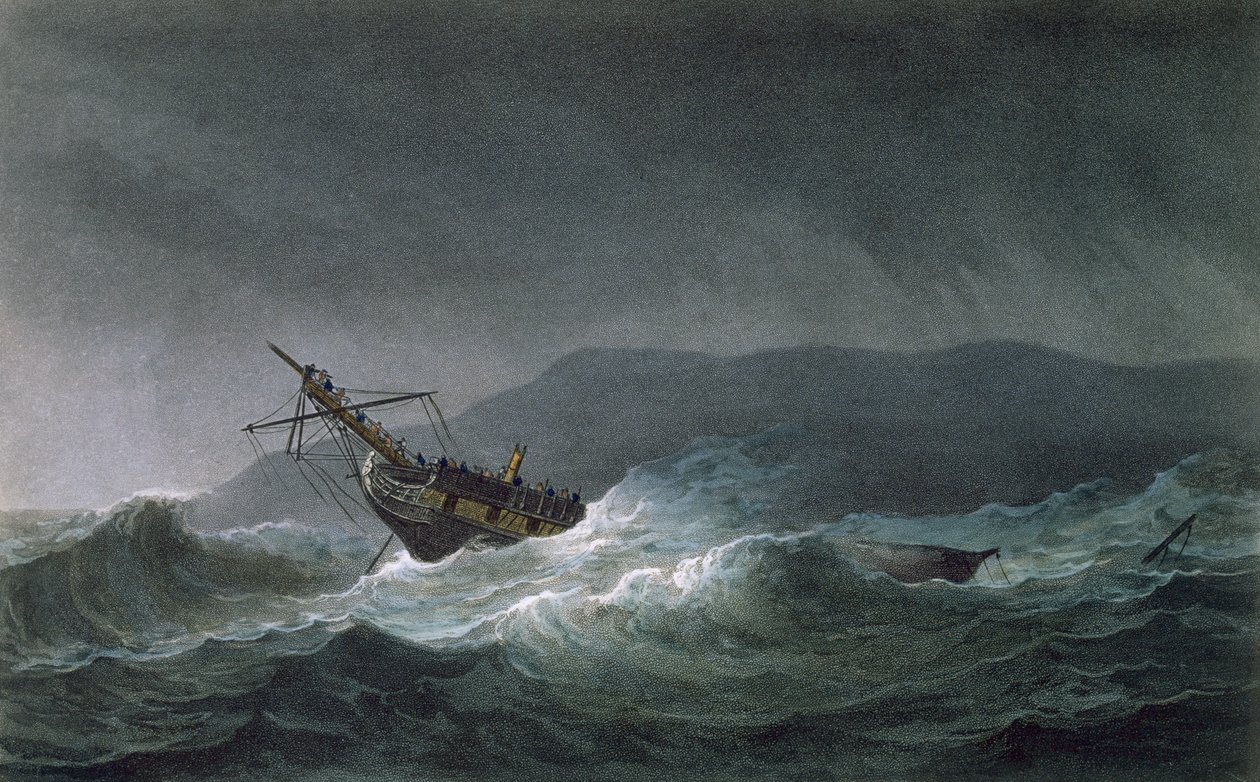
The loss of Blanche

== Fate ==
Blanche was paid off in August 1798 and fitted out as a storeship the following year. She was further converted to a troopship and commissioned under Commander John Ayscough. While under his command she grounded in the entrance to the Texel on 28 September 1799 and was declared a constructive total loss.
