= List of ship launches in 1787 =

The list of ship launches in 1787 includes a chronological list of some ships launched in 1787.

Date	Ship	Class	Builder	Location	Country	Notes
20 January	Marquis of Lansdown	East Indiaman	Hill & Mellish	Limehouse	Great Britain	For British East India Company.
22 January	Blonde	Frigate	Thomas Calhoun	Bursledon	Great Britain	For Royal Navy.
5 February	Hartwell	East Indiaman	Caleb Crookenden & Co.	Itchenor	Great Britain	For British East India Company.
6 March	Vanguard	Arrogant-class ship of the line		Deptford Dockyard	Great Britain	For Royal Navy.
7 March	Nottingham	East Indiaman	William Cleverley	Gravesent	Great Britain	For British East India Company.
31 March	Fyen	Prindsesse Sophia Frederica-class ship of the line		Copenhagen	Denmark-Norway	For Dano-Norwegian Navy.
4 April	Colossus	Courageux-class ship of the line	William Cleverley	Gravesend	Great Britain	For Royal Navy.
4 April	Swiftsure	Elizabeth-class ship of the line	John & William Wells	Deptford	Great Britain	For Royal Navy.
18 April	Alligator	Enterprise-class frigate	Philemon Jacobs	Sandgate	Great Britain	For Royal Navy.
18 April	Belvedere	East Indiaman	Crookenden & Taylor	Itchenor	Great Britain	For British East India Company.
18 April	Orion	Téméraire-class ship of the line		Rochefort	Kingdom of France	For French Navy.
20 April	Alerte	Brig of war	Hubert Pennevert	Rochefort	Kingdom of France	For French Navy.
2 May	Salvador del Mundo	Santa Ana-class ship of the line	Reales Astilleros de Esteiro	Ferrol	Spain	For Spanish Navy.
4 May	Goéland	Goéland-class brick-aviso	Raymond-Antoine Haran	Bayonne	Kingdom of France	For French Navy.
9 May	Arkhangel Gavriil	Briachislav-class frigate	M. D. Portnov	Arhchangelsk	Russia	For Imperial Russian Navy.
9 May	Severnyi Oryol	Aziia-class ship of the line	M. D. Portnov	Arkhangelsk	Russia	For Imperial Russian Navy.
15 May	Alexander Nevskii	Fourth rate	S.I. Afanaseyev	Kherson	Russia	For Imperial Russian Navy.
15 May	Sviatoi Vladimir	Slava Ekateriny-class ship of the line	S. I. Afanaseyev	Kherson	Russia	For Imperial Russian Navy.
18 May	Gracieuse	Charmante-class frigate	Joseph Niou	Rochefort	Kingdom of France	For French Navy.
31 May	Mukaddeme-i Nusret	Third rate	Jean-Jacques Sébastien Le Roy	Constantinople	Ottoman Empire	For Ottoman Navy.
May	Mouche	brig of war	Raymond-Antoine Haran	Bayonne	Kingdom of France	For French Navy.
1 June	Orion	Canada-class ship of the line	Barnard	Deptford	Great Britain	For Royal Navy.
15 June	Josif II	Third rate	S. I. Afanaseyev	Kherson	Russia	For Imperial Russian Navy.
22 June	Léopard	Téméraire-class ship of the line		Brest	Kingdom of France	For French Navy.
11 July	Impérieuse	Junon-class frigate	Joseph-Marie-Blaise Coulomb	Toulon	Kingdom of France	For French Navy.
16 July	Sheerness	Adventure-class ship	Edward Hunt	Buckler's Hard	Great Britain	For Royal Navy.
31 July	Harriot	West Indiaman	John Mackenzie	Rotherhithe	Great Britain	For Mr. Davidson.
9 August	Sensible	Magicienne-class frigate		Toulon	Kingdom of France	For French Navy.
13 August	Nossa Senhora da Graça	Fourth rate		Salvador	Portugal	For Portuguese Navy.
14 August	Veteran	Third rate	Fabian	East Cowes	Great Britain	For French Navy.
14 September	Justinian	West Indiaman	Peter Everitt Mestaer	Rotherhithe	Great Britain	For Hamilton & Co.
12 October	Entreprenant	Téméraire-class ship of the line		Lorient	Kingdom of France	For French Navy.
25 October	Impétueux	Téméraire-class ship of the line		Rochefort	Kingdom of France	For French Navy.
27 October	Albion	East Indiaman	John Perry	Blacwall	Great Britain	For British East India Company.
27 October	Lord Hawkesbury	East Indiaman	Randall & Brent	Rotherhithe	Great Britain	For British East India Company.
October	Recherche	Marsouin-class scow		Bayonne	Kingdom of France	For French Navy.
4 November	Real Carlos	Santa Ana-class ship of the line		Havana	(Spain) Cuba	For Spanish Navy.
10 November	Carnatic	East Indiaman	John Randall	Rotherhithe	Great Britain	For British East India Company.
10 November	Pacific	East Indiaman		Rotherhithe	Great Britain	For private owner.
26 November	Captain	Canada-class ship of the line	Robert Batson	Limehouse	Great Britain	For Royal Navy.
26 November	Triton	East Indiaman	Randall	Rotherhithe	Great Britain	For British East India Company.
27 November	Excellent	Arrogant-class ship of the line	Graham	Harwich	Great Britain	For Royal Navy.
28 November	Ceres	East Indiaman	Perry & Co.	Blackwall	Great Britain	For British East India Company.
11 December	Airly Castle	East Indiaman	Barnard	Deptford	Great Britain	For British East India Company.
27 December	Boddam	East Indiaman	Barnard	Deptford	Great Britain	For British East India Company.
December	Le Bretagne	East Indiaman		Lorient	Kingdom of France	For Compagnie des Indes.
Unknown date	Aleksander Nevskii	Third rate		Saint Petersburg	Russia	For Imperial Russian Navy.
Unknown date	Bityug	Unrated			Russia	For Imperial Russian Navy.
Unknown date	Bomb No. 1	Bomb vessel	Dorf-Gården	Kiel	Duchy of Holstein	For Imperial Russian Navy.
Unknown date	Bomb No. 2	Bomb vessel	Dorf-Gården	Kiel	Duchy of Holstein	For Imperial Russian Navy.
Unknown date	Brilliant	Sloop	Nicholas Bools	Bridport	Great Britain	For William Darley.
Unknown date	Cartier	Brig		Bombay	India	For Bombay Pilot Service.
Unknown date	Cecilia	Merchantman		Surat	India	For Private owner.
Unknown date	Ceres	Brig		Ipswich	Great Britain	For private owner.
Unknown date	Cornwallis	East Indiaman		Bombay Dockyard	India	For British East India Company.
Unknown date	Feniks	Brig of war			Russia	For Imperial Russian Navy.
Unknown date	Infante	Brig of war		Cádiz	Spain	For Spanish Navy.
Unknown date	Jay	Snow		Bombay	India	For Bombay Pilot Service.
Unknown date	Juno	Snow		Bombay	India	For Bombay Pilot Service.
Unknown date	Kitty	Merchantman		Sunderland, County Durham	Great Britain	For private owner.
Unknown date	Lapwing	Sloop			Great Britain	For Granville Sharp.
Unknown date	Minerva	Brig of war		Veere	Dutch Republic	For Dutch Navy.
Unknown date	Seahorse	Brig		Bombay	India	For Bombay Pilot Service.
Unknown date	Shaw Arsdeer	Full-rigged ship		Bombay	India	For private owner.
Unknown date	Stege	Gunboat		Copenhagen	Denmark-Norway	For Dano-Norwegian Navy.
Unknown date	Tartar	Merchantman			Great Britain	For John St Barbe.
Unknown date	Thetis	Brig			Great Britain	For Taylor & Co.
Unknown date	No. 1 chain boat	Chain boat	William Wallis	Blackwall	Great Britain	For Royal Navy.
Unknown date	Wilhelmina	Fifth rate		Vlissingen	Dutch Republic	For Dutch Navy.
Unknown date	Name unknown	Merchantman			Kingdom of France	For private owner.
Unknown date	Name unknown	Merchantman			Kingdom of France	For private owner.
Unknown date	Name unknown	Schooner		Parkgate	Great Britain	For private owner.
Unknown date	Name unknown	Merchantman			Kingdom of France	For private owner.
