= Tartar (ship) =

Several vessels have been named Tartar:

- Tartar (1766 ship), of 300 tons (bm), was launched in Virginia under another name. She first appeared as Tartar in Lloyd's Register in 1783, having formerly been named Stag. From about 1790 she was a whaler in the British northern whale fishery. On 27 March 1797, the French privateer Jalousie, of 14 guns and 160 men, captured the Greenlandman Tartar off Buchaness in a single ship action lasting an hour-and-a-half. Jalousie took Tartar into Bergen.
- Tartar (1775 ship) was launched at Bermuda in 1775, possibly under another name. By 1779 she was a privateer sailing out of Liverpool. She captured several prizes, first in the West Indies and then around England. Two French frigates captured her in October 1780.
- Fly (1772 ship) was launched in 1772. She then made three voyages to Africa as a slave ship between 1772 and 1778. Circa 1780 she was renamed Tartar. She then made six more slave trading voyages. From circa 1789 on she became a local trader; she was last listed in 1794.
- After the Royal Navy sold HMS Spy (1756) in 1773, she was named Tartar between 1783 and 1787.
- Tartar (1778 ship) was launched at Bristol, England, in 1778. Initially she sailed as a privateer. Then in 1781 she became a slave ship in the triangular trade in enslaved people. She made one complete voyage as a slave ship; French naval vessels captured Tartar on her second slave trading voyage.
- Tartar (1780 ship) was built in France in 1778, almost surely under another name. She was taken in prize and appeared under British ownership in 1780. After a short career as a privateer, she made a voyage between 1781 and 1783 as an extra East Indiaman for the British East India Company (EIC). She then became a whaler in the Northern Whale Fishery (Greenland and Davis Strait). After whaling she traded with the Baltic and then served as a London-based transport. She was probably lost in 1799, and was last listed in 1801. If Tartar is the vessel lost in 1799, in 1796 French warships captured her, but the Royal Navy quickly recaptured her.
- Tartar (1781 ship) was built in France in 1779, probably under another name, and taken in prize. She was in 1781 briefly a Bristol-based privateer. A French privateer captured her, but a British privateer recaptured her. She then became the merchantman Friends, and traded between Bristol and North America, primarily Newfoundland. Friends was last listed in 1793.
- Tartar (1787 ship) (later Tartar Packet) was launched on the River Thames in 1787. She made one voyage to Bengal and back carrying dispatches for the British East India Company (EIC). On her return she became a packet for the Post Office Packet Service, sailing from Falmouth, Cornwall. In June 1796 she was bringing mail from New York back to Falmouth when a French privateer captured her.
- Tartar (1799 ship) was built in Spain in 1784, almost certainly under another name. She was taken in prize and appeared under British ownership in 1799. She became a slave ship sailing from Liverpool but French warships captured her in late 1799 on her first slave trading voyage before she was able to embark any slaves.
- Tartar (1806 ship) was launched in France in 1802, or Spain in 1805, almost certainly under another name. In 1806 she sailed under the flag of the United Kingdom on a voyage as a slave ship from Liverpool. On her return she started trading between Liverpool and Brazil and Africa. A French frigate captured her in 1813, but then released her. She was wrecked early in 1815.
- Tartar (1811 ship) was launched in France in 1807, almost surely under another name. She was captured circa 1811 and traded to Brazil, first from Liverpool and then from Falmouth, Cornwall. She disappeared without a trace in January 1814.
- Tartar (1813 privateer) was an unsuccessful American privateer schooner during the War of 1812. She was launched in 1813 and was driven ashore and destroyed on her maiden voyage at the end of the year, not having captured anything.

== See also ==
- HMS Tartar - any one of several warships of the Royal Navy
- USS Tartar
