= List of shipwrecks in 1785 =

The List of shipwrecks in 1785 includes some ship sunk, wrecked or otherwise lost during 1785.

table of contents
1785
Jan	Feb	Mar	Apr
May	Jun	Jul	Aug
Sep	Oct	Nov	Dec
Unknown date

== January ==
=== 2 January ===
List of shipwrecks: 2 January 1785
Ship	State	Description
Hector	Great Britain	The ship ran aground and sank at Lisbon, Portugal with the loss of three of her crew. She was on a voyage from Newfoundland to Lisbon.
Suewoodsky	Russia	The ship was driven ashore near Happisburgh, Norfolk, Great Britain with the loss of nine of her crew. She was on a voyage from Saint Petersburg to Nantes, France.
Thomas and Betsey	Great Britain	The ship was lost near Mallorca, Spain with the loss of a crew member. She was on a voyage from Newfoundland, British America to Livorno, Grand Duchy of Tuscany.
Several unnamed vessels	Flags unknown	The ships were driven ashore at Lisbon. They were refloated.

=== 3 January ===
List of shipwrecks: 3 January 1785
Ship	State	Description
Unnamed	Dutch Republic	The ship foundered in the North Sea off the coast of Suffolk, Great Britain with loss of life. Part of the vessel and two bodies came ashore at Aldeburgh.

=== 5 January ===
List of shipwrecks: 5 January 1785
Ship	State	Description
Juffrow Anna Louisa	Prussia	The ship was driven ashore and wrecked on the south coast of the Isle of Wight., Great Britain. She was on a voyage from St. Ubes, Portugal to Pirna.
Sally	Great Britain	The ship was driven ashore and wrecked at Mountbatten, Devon. She was on a voyage from Yarmouth, Isle of Wight to Dublin, Ireland.

=== 7 January ===
List of shipwrecks: 7 January 1785
Ship	State	Description
General Elliot	Great Britain	The ship, which had been damaged in a gale on 1 January, was abandoned in the Atlantic Ocean. Her crew were rescued by Grantham (Great Britain). General Elliot was on a voyage from Newfoundland, British America to Porto, Portugal.

=== 8 January ===
List of shipwrecks: 8 January 1785
Ship	State	Description
Woohlfaart	Stettin	The ship was driven ashore on the south coast of the Isle of Wight, Great Britain. She was on a voyage from Lisbon, Portugal to Amsterdam, Dutch Republic.

=== 16 January ===
List of shipwrecks: 16 January 1785
Ship	State	Description
Nostra Señora Del Carmen	Republic of Ragusa	The polacre was wrecked on the Diamond Rock, off Lisbon, Portugal. She was on a voyage from Alicante, Spain to Lisbon.

=== 21 January ===
List of shipwrecks: 21 January 1785
Ship	State	Description
Union	Great Britain	The ship was wrecked in the Atlantic Ocean (36°44′N 40°00′W). Four survivors were rescued by Canefeild (Great Britain). Union was on a voyage from Lisbon, Portugal to Philadelphia, Pennsylvania, United States.

=== 31 January ===
List of shipwrecks: 31 January 1785
Ship	State	Description
Apollo	Great Britain	The ship was driven ashore and severely damaged at Whitby, Yorkshire.
Charlotte	Great Britain	The ship was driven ashore and wrecked near Great Yarmouth, Norfolk. Her crew were rescued. She was on a voyage from Blyth, Northumberland to London.
Mary	Great Britain	The ship was driven ashore and wrecked near Great Yarmouth. She was on a voyage from Leith, Lothian to London.
Providence	Great Britain	The ship was driven ashore at Great Yarmouth. Her crew were rescued. She was on a voyage from Hull, Yorkshire to London.

=== Unknown date ===
List of shipwrecks: Unknown date in January 1785
Ship	State	Description
Amelia	Great Britain	The ship was wrecked off Villa Viciosa, Spain.
Aurora	Great Britain	The ship struck rocks off the Isles of Scilly and consequently foundered in St. Helen's Gap. She was on a voyage from Liverpool, Lancashire to London.
Austin	Great Britain	The ship was wrecked at Holyhead, Anglesey. She was on a voyage from Lisbon, Portugal to Liverpool.
Bacchus	Great Britain	The ship was driven ashore on the south coast of the Isle of Wight.
Baltic Merchant	Great Britain	The ship was driven ashore on the coast of Lincolnshire. She was later refloated and resumed her voyage.
Betsy	Great Britain	The ship ran aground at Aveiro, Portugal and was severely damaged. She was on a voyage from Newfoundland, British America to Aveiro.
Concord	Great Britain	The ship was sunk by ice in the Delaware River, United States.
Flora	Great Britain	The ship was driven ashore and wrecked on Sanday, Orkney Islands. She was on a voyage from Narva, Russia to London.
Fortune	Great Britain	The ship capsized in the North Sea. She was on a voyage from Porto, Portugal to Aberdeen. Fortune was towed in to Harwich, Essex still on her side and crewless.
Holmpton	Great Britain	The ship collided with another vessel and was damaged. She was on a voyage from Saint Petersburg, Russia to Hull, Yorkshire.
Nelly	Great Britain	The ship was driven ashore and wrecked at Holyhead. She was on a voyage from Jamaica to Liverpool.
Prudent	Great Britain	The ship was driven ashore in the Isles of Scilly. Her crew survived.
Stokestown	Great Britain	The ship was wrecked on Flat Holm, in the Bristol Channel. Her crew were rescued. She was on a voyage from Bristol, Gloucestershire to Waterford, Ireland.
Venturoso	Spain	The ship was driven ashore at Newport, Great Britain. She was on a voyage from Bilbao to Ostend, Dutch Republic.
Venus	Great Britain	The ship was lost whilst on a voyage from Seville, Spain to Bruges, Dutch Republic.

== February ==
=== 9 February ===
List of shipwrecks: 9 February 1785
Ship	State	Description
Alexander	Great Britain	The ship was lost at Whitby, Yorkshire. Her crew were rescued. She was on a voyage from Newcastle upon Tyne, Northumberland to Whitby.
Endeavour	Great Britain	The ship was driven ashore at Whitby. Her crew were rescued. She was on a voyage from Newcastle upon Tyne to Whitby. Endeavour was later refloated.

=== 15 February ===
List of shipwrecks: 15 February 1785
Ship	State	Description
Longsplice	Great Britain	The ship was driven ashore at Seaford, Sussex by HMS Echo and HMS Wasp (both (Kingdom of Great Britain) Royal Navy) whilst engaged in smuggling. She was refloated and taken in to Dover, Kent by HMS Wasp.

=== 17 February ===
List of shipwrecks: 17 February 1785
Ship	State	Description
Ocean	Great Britain	The ship was driven ashore near Scarborough, Yorkshire. She was later refloated and taken in to Scarborough.

=== 21 February ===
List of shipwrecks: 21 February 1785
Ship	State	Description
Donets (Донец)	Imperial Russian Navy	The galiot was beached near Yalta. Her crew survived. She was on a voyage from Kertch to Sevastopol. She broke up the next day.

=== 24 February ===
List of shipwrecks: 24 February 1785
Ship	State	Description
Tabitha	Bremen	The ship was wrecked near Cape Henry, Virginia, United States with some loss of life. She was on a voyage from Bremen to Baltimore, Maryland, United States.

=== Unknown date ===
List of shipwrecks: Unknown date in February 1785
Ship	State	Description
Abby	Great Britain	The ship was driven ashore and severely damaged at Dublin, Ireland. She was on a voyage from New York, United States to Liverpool, Lancashire.
Adventure	Great Britain	The ship was lost at L'Orient, France. She was on a voyage from Cádiz, Spain to London.
Glatney	Great Britain	The ship was lost at Guernsey, Channel Islands. She was on a voyage from London to Guernsey.
Glory	Great Britain	The ship was lost near Plymouth, Devon.
Isabella & Ann	Great Britain	The ship was driven ashore at Fisherrow, Lothian. She was on a voyage from Leith, Lothian to Hull, Yorkshire.
Jenny	Great Britain	The ship was driven ashore at Loch Indaal. She was on a voyage from the United States to Liverpool.
Jenny	Ireland	The ship was wrecked on the Isle of Man. She was on a voyage from an Irish port to Porto, Portugal.
John & Betty	Great Britain	The ship foundered in the Atlantic Ocean. Her crew were rescued by a Venetian ship. She was on a voyage from Lisbon, Portugal to Bristol, Gloucestershire.
Merchant	Great Britain	The ship was wrecked on the Atherfield Ledge, Isle of Wight. She was on a voyage from Virginia, United States to London.
Nossa Senhora da luz	Portugal	The ship was driven ashore and wrecked at Madeira. Her crew were rescued.
Polly	Great Britain	The ship was driven ashore at Loch Indaal. She was on a voyage from Virginia to Liverpool.
Tannen Baum	Prussia	The ship was wrecked on the Cockle Sand, in the North Sea off the coast of Norfolk, Great Britain with the loss of all hands. She was on a voyage from Königsberg to Leith, Lothian, Great Britain.
Three Friends	United States	The ship was driven ashore on São Miguel Island, Azores. She was on a voyage from New York to São Miguel.
Woolton	Great Britain	The ship was driven ashore in Barnstaple Bay. She was on a voyage from Liverpool to London.
Four unnamed vessels	Great Britain	The ships foundered in the Baltic Sea off Memel, Prussia. Their crews were rescued.

== March ==
=== 15 March ===
List of shipwrecks: 15 March 1785
Ship	State	Description
Industry	France	The ship foundered during a voyage from Catalonia, Spain to Calais. Her crew were rescued by an English vessel.

=== 17 March ===
List of shipwrecks: 17 March 1785
Ship	State	Description
Les Amies	France	The ship was driven ashore and wrecked at Gibraltar. Her crew were rescued. She was on a voyage from Marseille to L'Orient.
St. Antonio de Padua	Spain	The ship was driven ashore and wrecked at Gibraltar. Her crew were rescued. She was on a voyage from Vinaròs to Cádiz.
St. Francisco de Asis	Spain	The ship was driven ashore and wrecked at Gibraltar. Her crew were rescued. She was on a voyage from Málaga to Cádiz.
Vreihend	Lübeck	The ship was driven ashore and wrecked at Gibraltar. Her crew were rescued. She was on a voyage from Cette, France to Lübeck.

=== 29 March ===
List of shipwrecks: 29 March 1785
Ship	State	Description
Friends	Great Britain	The ship was destroyed by fire at St. Ubes, Portugal. She was on a voyage from Livorno, Grand Duchy of Tuscany to London.

=== Unknown date ===
List of shipwrecks: Unknown date in March 1785
Ship	State	Description
Isabella	Great Britain	The ship was lost whilst on a voyage from Cowes, Isle of Wight to Belfast, County Antrim, Ireland.
John and Henry	Great Britain	The ship was lost near Porto, Portugal with the loss of all but two of her crew. She was on a voyage from Porto to Plymouth, Devon.
Jonge Gesina	Dutch Republic	The ship was wrecked on the Goodwin Sands, Kent, Great Britain. She was on a voyage from Nantes, France to Bruges.
Joss	Great Britain	The ship was wrecked on the coast of Ireland. She was on a voyage from Scotland to Nantes.
Mary	Great Britain	The ship was wrecked on the coast of Ireland. Her crew were rescued. She was on a voyage from Bristol, Gloucestershire to Limerick, Ireland.
Robert and Ann	Great Britain	The ship was wrecked on the Goodwin Sands with the loss of all hands. She was on a voyage from Porto to London.
Triton	Great Britain	The ship foundered in the Atlantic Ocean off Fayal, Azores.

== April ==
=== 1 April ===
List of shipwrecks: 1 April 1785
Ship	State	Description
Peggy and Betsey	Great Britain	The ship was destroyed by fire at Lossiemouth, Morayshire.

=== 10 April ===
List of shipwrecks: 10 April 1785
Ship	State	Description
Hinchinbrooke	British East India Company	The East Indiaman was lost in the Bengal River, India. Her crew were rescued.

=== Unknown date ===
List of shipwrecks: Unknown date in April 1785
Ship	State	Description
Ann and James	Great Britain	The ship sank at Gibraltar.
Donna Maria	Hamburg	The ship foundered with the loss of all hands. She was on a voyage from Alicante, Spain to Hamburg.
Maria Luisa	Prussia	The ship was driven ashore and wrecked at Skagen, Denmark. She was on a voyage from Liverpool, Lancashire, Great Britain to Memel.
Three Brothers	Ireland	The ship was wrecked on Islay. She was on a voyage from Belfast, County Antrim to Norway.
Watson	Great Britain	The ship was driven ashore and wrecked on the coast of Jutland. She was on a voyage from Hull, Yorkshire to Danzig.
William and Mary	Great Britain	The ship was driven ashore at Chapman Head, Kent, in the Thames Estuary. She was on a voyage from Hamburg to London.

== May ==
=== 4 May ===
List of shipwrecks: 4 May 1785
Ship	State	Description
Brederode	Dutch East India Company	The East Indiaman was lost near Cape Agulhas, Africa with the loss of twelve of her 92 crew. She was on a voyage from China to Amsterdam.

=== 24 May ===
List of shipwrecks: 24 May 1785
Ship	State	Description
Yassy (Яссы, 'Iași')	Imperial Russian Navy	The transport ship foundered over several days in the Sea of Azov with the loss of seven lives. She was on a voyage from Yenikale to Taganrog.

=== Unknown date ===
List of shipwrecks: Unknown date in May 1785
Ship	State	Description
Amiable Rose	France	The ship was lost at Dunkirk. Her crew were rescued. She was on a voyage from Martinique to Dunkirk.
Hope	Great Britain	The ship lost on the coast of Calabria. She was on a voyage from Livorno, Grand Duchy of Tuscany to Gallipoli, Ottoman Empire and Saint Petersburg, Russia.
Jenny	Great Britain	The ship was sunk by ice at Memel, Prussia.
La Charlotte	France	The ship was wrecked on the coast of Spain. She was on a voyage from Dunkirk to Genoa and Livorno.

== June ==
=== 22 June ===
List of shipwrecks: 22 June 1785
Ship	State	Description
Delight	United States	The brig foundered in the Atlantic Ocean (31°12′N 71°50′W). Her crew took to a boat. They were rescued on 3 July.

=== Unknown date ===
List of shipwrecks: Unknown date in June 1785
Ship	State	Description
Marine	Great Britain	The ship was lost near Mount's Bay. She was on a voyage from Dartmouth, Devon to Waterford, Ireland and Newfoundland, British America.

== July ==
=== 3 July ===
List of shipwrecks: 3 July 1785
Ship	State	Description
Constantia	Portugal	The ship was driven ashore and wrecked at "Kingkiobing" with the loss of eight of her crew. She was on a voyage from St. Ubes, Portugal to Riga, Russia.

=== 8 July ===
List of shipwrecks: 8 July 1785
Ship	State	Description
Esther	Great Britain	The ship ran aground in the Humber and was wrecked. She was on a voyage from Hull, Yorkshire to Whitby, Yorkshire.

=== 9 July ===
List of shipwrecks: 9 July 1785
Ship	State	Description
Patuxant or Potomack	Great Britain	The ship foundered whilst on a voyage from Virginia, United States to London. Her crew were rescued by a French brig and a Dutch ship. Thos on board the French vessel were transferred to Hampshire (Great Britain).

=== 23 July ===
List of shipwrecks: 23 July 1785
Ship	State	Description
Copernicus	Denmark	The ship ran aground in the Swin. She was on a voyage from Saint Croix to Copenhagen.

=== 30 July ===
List of shipwrecks: 30 July 1785
Ship	State	Description
Golden Angle	Dutch Republic	The ship sank at anchor off Ostend. She was on a voyage from Dunkirk, France to Vlissingen.

=== Unknown date ===
List of shipwrecks: Unknown date in July 1785
Ship	State	Description
Bons Amis	France	The ship was lost near Genoa. She was on a voyage from Dunkirk to Genoa and Livorno, Grand Duchy of Tuscany.
Charming Nancy	Great Britain	The ship was wrecked on "Ivica". She was on a voyage from Dunkirk to Livorno.
Charming Sally	Great Britain	The ship was lost near Formby, Lancashire. She was on a voyage from London to Liverpool, Lancashire.
Empress	Great Britain	The ship was driven ashore on Hiiumaa, Russia. She was on a voyage from Saint Petersburg, Russia to Hull, Yorkshire.
Samuel	Great Britain	The ship was driven ashore at Liverpool. She was on a voyage from Antigua to Liverpool.
St. Cuthbert	Great Britain	The ship was lost in the Saint Lawrence River. She was on a voyage from Quebec, British America to the West Indies.
Swarte Orn	(Sweden) Swedish East India Company	The East Indiaman was driven ashore near Landskrona. She was on a voyage from Amsterdam, Dutch Republic to Stockholm.

== August ==
=== 24 August ===
List of shipwrecks: 25 August 1785
Ship	State	Description
Betsey	Great Britain	The schooner was driven ashore on Saint Kitts.
Hazard	Great Britain	The schooner was driven out to sea from Saint Kitts. No further trace.
Jane	Great Britain	The schooner was driven out to sea from Saint Kitts. No further trace.
Spooner	Great Britain201085	The ship was driven ashore and wrecked at Saint Kitts. Her crew were rescued.
Thomas	Great Britain	The ship was driven ashore and wrecked at Saint Kitts. Her crew were rescued.
Five unnamed vessels	Great Britain	The ships were driven ashore in Deep Bay, Saint Kitts.
Three unnamed vessels	France	A brig, a schooner and a sloop were driven ashore and wrecked on Saint Barthélemy.
Five unnamed vessels	France	A sloop and four other vessels were driven ashore on Dominica, French West Indies.

=== 25 August ===
List of shipwrecks: 25 August 1785
Ship	State	Description
Cornwallis	Great Britain	The ship was driven ashore in Neava Bay, Hispaniola during a hurricane and was wrecked. Her crew were rescued. She was on a voyage from Antigua to Puerto Rico.
Henrick	Stettin	The ship was driven ashore on Anholt, Denmark. Her crew were rescued. She was on a voyage from Stettin to Le Havre, France.

=== 26 August ===
List of shipwrecks: 26 August 1785
Ship	State	Description
Adventure	Great Britain	The ship was driven ashore in a hurricane at Jamaica.
Alexander	Great Britain	The ship was driven ashore in a hurricane at Jamaica.
Amity's Production	Great Britain	The ship was driven ashore in a hurricane at Jamaica.
Constantine	Great Britain	The ship was wrecked in a hurricane at Thatch Island, Virgin Islands. Her crew were rescued. She was on a voyage from Dominica to Bristol, Gloucestershire.
Dispatch	Great Britain	The ship was driven ashore in a hurricane at Jamaica. She was later refloated undamaged.
Endeavour	Great Britain	The ship was lost in a hurricane at Castle Fort, Jamaica.
Fame	Great Britain	Captain Moyes's ship was driven ashore in a hurricane at Jamaica.
Fame	Great Britain	Captain Roblin's ship was wrecked in a hurricane at Jamaica.
Favourite	Great Britain	The ship was driven ashore in a hurricane at Jamaica.
General Campbell	Great Britain	The ship was wrecked in a hurricane at Jamaica.
Henry	Great Britain	The ship was wrecked in a hurricane at Jamaica.
Holland	Great Britain	Captain Erman's ship was driven ashore in a hurricane at Jamaica.
Holland	Great Britain	Captain Howes's ship was lost in a hurricane at Port Maria, Jamaica.
Hope	Great Britain	The ship was wrecked in a hurricane at Jamaica.
Hornet	Great Britain	The ship was driven ashore in a hurricane at Jamaica.
Industry	Great Britain	The ship was driven ashore and wrecked in a hurricane at Bull Bay, Jamaica.
Jamaica	Great Britain	The ship was lost in a hurricane at Annato Bay, Jamaica.
John and Ann	Great Britain	The ship was lost in a hurricane at Jamaica.
Mary Ann	Great Britain	The ship was lost in a hurricane at Annato Bay.
Minerva	Great Britain	The ship was driven ashore in a hurricane at Jamaica.
Molly	Great Britain	The Guineaman was driven ashore in a hurricane at Jamaica.
Neptune	Great Britain	The ship was driven ashore in a hurricane at Jamaica.
Philadelphia	United States	The ship was driven ashore in a hurricane at Jamaica.
Rover	Great Britain	The ship was wrecked in a hurricane at Bush Quay, Jamaica.
Sally	Great Britain	Captain Patterson's ship was driven ashore in a hurricane at Jamaica.
Sally	Great Britain	Captain Reid's ship was driven ashore in a hurricane at Jamaica.
Savile	Great Britain	The ship was lost in a hurricane at Jamaica.
Success	Great Britain	The ship was wrecked in a hurricane at Jamaica.
Swallow	Great Britain	The ship was driven ashore in a hurricane at Port Maria, Jamaica.
Swallow Packet	Great Britain	The ship was driven ashore in a hurricane at Jamaica.
Swift	Great Britain	The ship sank in a hurricane at Jamaica.
Triton	Great Britain	The ship was driven ashore in a hurricane at Jamaica. She was later refloated undamaged.
Washington	United States	The ship was driven ashore in a hurricane at Jamaica.
William and Mary	Great Britain	The ship was driven ashore in a hurricane at Jamaica.
Nine unnamed vessels	Flags unknown	Two brigs, a full-rigged ship, two schooners and four sloops were wrecked in a hurricane on the Chain of Rocky Quays, Jamaica.
Unnamed	France	The ship caught fire off St. Jago de la Vega, Jamaica.
Seven unnamed vessels	Flags unknown	The ships were driven ashore in a hurricane at Jéremie, Saint-Domingue.
Three unnamed vessels	Flags unknown	The ships were driven ashore in a hurricane at Cape Francois, Saint-Domingue.
20 Unnamed vessels	Flags unknown	The ships were driven ashore in a hurricane at Port-au-Prince, Saint-Domingyue.
Two unnamed vessels	United States	The brigs were driven ashore in a hurricane at Aux Cayes, Saint-Domingue.
Unnamed	France	The sloop was driven ashore and wrecked in a hurricane at Aux Cayes.
Unnamed	France	The schooner was driven ashore and wrecked in a hurricane at Jacomel, Saint-Domingue

=== Unknown date ===
List of shipwrecks: Unknown date in August 1785
Ship	State	Description
Adventure	Great Britain	The ship caught fire whilst on a voyage from St. Ubes, Portugal to London. She returned to St. Ubes but was destroyed.
Barbara Maria	Denmark	The ship sprang a leak and was abandoned in the Baltic Sea. She was found by some Swedish fishermen and beached at Marstrand, Sweden. Barbara Maria was on a voyage from Danzig to Barcelona, Spain.
Betsey and Polly	Great Britain	The ship sailed from a port in Georgia, United States for London. No further trace, presumed foundered in the Atlantic Ocean with the loss of all hands.
Jeune Dragon	France	The ship was driven ashore and wrecked on the Isle of Wight, Great Britain. She was on a voyage from Honfleur to Morlaix.
Leverpool	Great Britain	The ship was run down and sunk in the Bristol Channel off Worms Head, Glamorgan with the loss of five of her crew. She was on a voyage from Liverpool, Lancashire to Bristol, Gloucestershire.
Mary	Great Britain	The ship was wrecked in a hurricant at Jamaica.
Sophia Baker	Great Britain	The ship was driven ashore at Cape Florida, East Florida. She was on a voyage from Jamaica to London. She was refloated, and put in to a port in the Colony of Virginia on 21 August.
Standlinch	Great Britain	The ship was destroyed by fire in the River Thames. She was on a voyage from Jamaica to London.

== September ==
=== 1 September ===
List of shipwrecks: 1 September 1785
Ship	State	Description
Faithful Steward	Ireland	While on a voyage from Londonderry, Ireland, to Philadelphia, Pennsylvania, with 249 passengers and a crew of 13 aboard, the ship ran aground in the Atlantic Ocean about 100 yards (91 m) off the coast of Delaware near the Indian River Inlet, about 4 leagues (12 nautical miles (22 km)) south of Cape Henlopen, during a intense squall. The ship broke up on 2 September with the loss of around 200 lives, including 181 passengers. Fewer than 70 people survived.

=== 4 September ===
List of shipwrecks: 4 September 1785
Ship	State	Description
Robert	Great Britain	The ship was driven ashore and wrecked in Stokes Bay. She was on a voyage from Antigua to London. She was refloated in mid-October and taken in to Portsmouth, Hampshire.
Rosalie	Great Britain	The ship foundered in the Atlantic Ocean 100 leagues (300 nautical miles (560 km)) west of the Isles of Scilly. Her crew were rescued by London (Great Britain). Rosalie was on a voyage from Newfoundland, British America to Granville, France.

=== 6 September ===
List of shipwrecks: 6 September 1785
Ship	State	Description
Dorothea Charlotta	Lübeck	The ship was wrecked on the south coast of the Isle of Wight, Great Britain. She was on a voyage from Lübeck to Bordeaux, France.

=== 22 September ===
List of shipwrecks: 22 September 1785
Ship	State	Description
Amelia	Great Britain	The ship foundered in the Atlantic Ocean 70 leagues (210 nautical miles (390 km)) west of The Lizard, Cornwall. Her crew were rescued by Batchelor (Great Britain). Amelia was on a voyage from St. Ubes, Portugal to Elsinore, Denmark.

=== 24 September ===
List of shipwrecks: 24 September 1785
Ship	State	Description
Hope	Great Britain	The ship foundered in the North Sea off Aldeburgh, Suffolk. She was on a voyage from Riga, Russia to London.
Jesmond	Great Britain	The ship was wrecked off Cape Hatteras, Colony of Virginia. Her crew were rescued three days later by Crown (Great Britain).

=== 25 September ===
List of shipwrecks: 27 September 1785
Ship	State	Description
Fame	Great Britain	The ship was wrecked on the Redwaise Sands, off the coast of Anglesey with the loss of all sixteen people on board. She was on a voyage from Dublin to Liverpool, Lancashire.

=== 27 September ===
List of shipwrecks: 27 September 1785
Ship	State	Description
Elizabeth	Sweden	The ship was driven ashore at Varberg. She was on a voyage from Stockholm to Málaga, Spain.
Prince of Wales	Great Britain	The ship foundered in the North Sea 15 leagues (45 nautical miles (83 km)) west north west of Orfordness, Suffolk. All on board were rescued by a Swedish vessel. She was on a voyage from Rotterdam, Dutch Republic to London.

=== Unknown date ===
List of shipwrecks: Unknown date in September 1785
Ship	State	Description
Alexander	Great Britain	The ship foundered off the coast of Norway. Her crew were rescued by Ottrington and Prospect (both Great Britain). Alexander was on a voyage from Hull, Yorkshire to a Baltic port.
Bella Rachel	Dutch Republic	The ship was driven ashore near Blankenberge, Dutch Republic. Her crew were rescued. She was on a voyage from Smyrna to Ostend, Dutch Republic.
Christian	Great Britain	The ship was destroyed by fire at Memel, Prussia.
Columbus	Great Britain	The ship was lost near Pillau, Prussia. She was on a voyage from Narva, Russia to Liverpool, Lancashire.
Constantine	Great Britain	The ship was driven ashore near Kronstadt, Russia. She was on a voyage from Bordeaux, France to Saint Petersburg, Russia.
Constant Trader	Great Britain	The ship struck a rock and foundered in the Gulf of Finland. Her crew were rescued. She was on a voyage from Bordeaux to Saint Petersburg.
Fame	Great Britain	The ship was driven ashore in The Burlings, Spain. She was on a voyage from Liverpool, Lancashire to Naples, Kingdom of Sicily. Fame was later refloated and resumed her voyage.
Fame	Great Britain	The ship was lost near Red Wharf Bay, Anglesey with the loss of all hands. She was on a voyage from Liverpool to Dublin, Ireland.
Fortune	Great Britain	The ship was driven ashore at Ramsgate, Kent. She was on a voyage from London to Ostend, Dutch Republic and Rouen, France. Fortune was later refloated and taken in to Broadstairs, Kent.
Gainford	Great Britain	The ship was lost south of Kronstadt. She was on a voyage from Newcastle upon Tyne, Northumberland to Saint Petersburg.
Hazard	Great Britain	The ship was driven ashore at Ramsgate. She was on a voyage from London to Africa.
Hope	Great Britain	The transport ship was driven out of New Providence, New Jersey, United States. No further trace, presumed foundered with the loss of all hands.
Neptune	Great Britain	The ship ran aground of the Shaw Reef, in the Baltic Sea. She was on a voyage from .
Nesbit	Great Britain	The ship was driven ashore and wrecked in the River Thames at Greenwich, Kent. She was on a voyage from Grenada to London.
Stralsund	Great Britain	The ship was wrecked on the Goodwin Sands, Kent with the loss of seven of her nine crew. She was on a voyage from Dublin to Stockholm.
Many vessels	United States	The ships were wrecked at New Bern, North Carolina.
Two unnamed vessels	United States	A brig and a sloop foundered off New Bern with the loss of all hands.

== October ==
=== 15 October ===
List of shipwrecks: 15 October 1785
Ship	State	Description
Le Ferm	France	The ship was struck by lightning and foundered in the Atlantic Ocean with the loss of seven of the 38 passengers and crew on board. She was on a voyage from Bordeaux to Martinique.

=== 20 October ===
List of shipwrecks: 20 October 1785
Ship	State	Description
Den Vlieger	Dutch Republic	The ship foundered in the North Sea off Ostend. She was on a voyage from Rotterdam to London, Great Britain.
Stadt Aurick	Dutch Republic	The ship foundered in the North Sea off Ostend. She was on a voyage from Middelburg to London.

=== 24 October ===
List of shipwrecks: 24 October 1785
Ship	State	Description
Sally	Great Britain	The ship was driven ashore at New Providence, Bahamas.

=== 26 October ===
List of shipwrecks: 26 October 1785
Ship	State	Description
Sea Venture	Great Britain	The ship was driven ashore on Læsø, Denmark. She was refloated but was driven ashore a second time and wrecked. Her crew were rescued. Sea Venture was on a voyage from Saint Petersburg, Russia to London.

=== 27 October ===
List of shipwrecks: 27 October 1785
Ship	State	Description
Mayflower	Great Britain	The ship foundered in the North Sea off the Dudgeon Lightship (Great Britain). Her crew were rescued.

=== 28 October ===
List of shipwrecks: 28 October 1785
Ship	State	Description
Fanny	Great Britain	The ship struck the Marsden Rock and sank at Marsden, County Durham with the loss of a crew member.

=== 31 October ===
List of shipwrecks: 31 October 1785
Ship	State	Description
True Anna	Swedish Pomerania	The ship foundered in the Baltic Sea 12 leagues (36 nautical miles (67 km)) west of "Roeshead". Her crew were rescued. She was on a voyage from Wolgast to Stettin.

=== Unknown date ===
List of shipwrecks: Unknown date in October 1785
Ship	State	Description
Active	Great Britain	The ship was lost near "Ballentoy". She was on a voyage from Memel, Prussia to Lancaster, Lancashire.
Britannia	Great Britain	The ship was driven ashore near Pillau, Prussia. Four survivors were rescued. She was on a voyage from Danzig to London.
Dover Trader	Great Britain	The ship was lost near "Pernam, Serkholm". She was on a voyage from Riga, Russia to London.
Elizabeth	Great Britain	The ship was lost on Terschelling, Dutch Republic. Her crew were rescued. She was on a voyage from Saint Petersburg, Russia to Bristol, Gloucestershire.
Flora	Great Britain	The ship was driven ashore and wrecked on the coast of Jutland. She was on a voyage from London to Gothenburg, Sweden.
General Carlton	Great Britain	The ship foundered in the Baltic Sea with the loss of all but three of her crew. She was on a voyage from Stockholm, Sweden to London.
George	Great Britain	The ship was wrecked on the Île de Ré, France. She was on a voyage from Chester, Cheshire to Rochefort, France.
Heart of Oak	Great Britain	The ship was driven ashore on Texel, Dutch Republic. She was on a voyage from Amsterdam to Norway.
John & Joseph	Great Britain	The ship foundered in the Baltic Sea off Gotland, Sweden. Her crew were rescued. She was on a voyage from Saint Petersburg, Russia to Liverpool, Lancashire.
Le Firme	France	The ship foundered in the Atlantic Ocean. Her crew were rescued on 18 October by Commerce (Great Britain).
London	Great Britain	The ship was lost near Gothenburg, Sweden. Her crew were rescyed. She was on a voyage from Stockholm to London, or from London to Danzig.
Prince William Henry	Great Britain	The ship ran aground in the River Nith and was wrecked. She was on a voyage from Saint Petersburg to Dumfries.
Providence	Great Britain	The ship foundered in the North Sea off the Dutch coast. Her crew were rescued.
Publica Fides	Sweden	The ship was lost whilst on a voyage from Stockholm to Dublin, Ireland.

== November ==
=== 4 November ===
List of shipwrecks: 4 November 1785
Ship	State	Description
Union	France	The ship was destroyed by fire at Baltimore, Maryland, United States. She was on a voyage from Port-au-Prince, Saint-Domingue to Bordeaux.

=== 5 November ===
List of shipwrecks: 5 November 1785
Ship	State	Description
Captain Claas Boornsman	Dutch Republic	The ship was driven ashore at "Torrico". She was on a voyage from Danzig to Ghent, France.
Captain Hans	Denmark	The ship was driven ashore at "Torrico". She was on a voyage from Pillau, Prussia to Lisbon, Portugal.
Captain Holm	France	The ship was driven ashore at "Skalla", Sweden.
Captain Peer William Jager	Prussia	The ship was driven ashore in Engelholm Bay, Sweden. She was on a voyage from Pillau to Bruges, France.
Captain Peter Bruge	(flag) Dutch Republic	The ship was driven ashore at "Torrico". She was on a voyage from Copenhagen, Denmark to Amsterdam, North Holland.
Elizabeth	Great Britain	The ship was driven ashore at Varberg, Sweden. She was on a voyage from Hull, Yorkshire to Elsinore, Denmark and Libava, Duchy of Courland and Semigallia.
Hope	Great Britain	The ship was wrecked at Varberg. She was on a voyage from Memel, Prussia to Kirkcaldy, Fife.
Jong Rudolph	Dutch Republic	The smack was wrecked at Varberg. She was on a voyage from Memel to Delfzijl, Groningen.
Little Bair	(Denmark) Norway	The ship was wrecked at Varberg. She was on a voyage from Königsberg, Prussia to Bergen, Norway
Prince Carle	Sweden	The ship was wrecked at Varberg. She was on a voyage from Stockholm to Dublin, Ireland.
Sophia Magdalena	Sweden	The ship was wrecked at Varberg. She was on a voyage from Karlshamn to Livorno, Grand Duchy of Tuscany.
Speculation	Great Britain	The ship was driven ashore at Varberg. She was on a voyage from Königsberg to Drøbak, Norway.
Thesmar	Sweden	The brig was wrecked at Varberg.
Unnamed	Portugal	The ship ran aground on the Lapsand. She was on a voyage from Saint Petersburg, Russia to Porto.

=== 24 November ===
List of shipwrecks: 24 November 1785
Ship	State	Description
Joyce	Great Britain	The ship departed from Newfoundland, British America. No further trace, presumed foundered with the loss of all hands.
Peggy	Ireland	The ship foundered in the Atlantic Ocean (32°25′N 63°37′W). Her crew were rescued. She was on a voyage from Waterford to New York, United States.

=== 27 November ===
List of shipwrecks: 27 November 1785
Ship	State	Description
James	United States	The full-rigged ship foundered in the Atlantic Ocean (27°10′N 68°40′W) whilst on a voyage from a port in North Carolina to Cape Francois, Saint-Domingue. Her crew were rescued by the schooner James (Great Britain).

=== Unknown date ===
List of shipwrecks: Unknown date in November 1785
Ship	State	Description
Aurora	Great Britain	The ship struck a rock and sank in Cádiz Bay. She was on a voyage from Sicily to Cádiz, Spain.
Batchelor	Great Britain	The ship was wrecked on the West Hoyle Bank, in Liverpool Bay. She was on a voyage from Liverpool, Lancashire to Jamaica.
Ceres	Great Britain	The ship was lost near Boulogne, France. She was on a voyage from Boston to London.
Felix	Russia	The ship was driven ashore on the Norwegian coast. She was on a voyage from Saint Petersburg to Cádiz.
Fortune	Great Britain	The ship foundered off Wingo. Her crew were rescued.
Fortune	Great Britain	The ship was lost on the coast of France. She was on a voyage from Porto, Portugal to London.
Friends	Great Britain	The ship was driven ashore near Faro, Portugal whilst evading an Algerine cruiser. She was on a voyage from New York, United States to Cádiz.
Hope	Great Britain	The ship was wrecked at Heligoland. Her crew were rescued. She was on a voyage from Danzig to London.
Jane	Great Britain	The ship was lost near Gotland, Sweden.
John & Betty	Great Britain	The ship was wrecked in Dunfanahy Bay, County Donegal, Ireland. She was on a voyage from Leith, Lothian to Dublin, Ireland.
Mary	Great Britain	The ship was driven ashore on the coast of Lincolnshire. She was on a voyage from London to Leith.
Mercury	Great Britain	The ship was lost about 4 nautical miles (7.4 km) from Memel, Prussia. She was on a voyage from Stettin to Memel.
Nancy	Great Britain	The ship was driven ashore at Penzance, Cornwall. She was on a voyage from the Musquito Shore to London.
Polly	Great Britain	The ship foundered off Lisbon, Portugal. She was on a voyage from Newfoundland, British America to Figueira da Foz, Portugal.
Sandwich	Great Britain	The ship was lost in Barnstaple Bay. She was on a voyage from Swansey, Glamorgan to Porto.
Sisters	Great Britain	The ship foundered off the Norwegian coast with the loss of her captain. She was on a voyage from Glasgow, Renfrewshire to Hamburg.
William Henry	Ireland	The ship was driven ashore at Kinsale, County Cork. She was on a voyage from Cork to Venice.

== December ==
=== 4 December ===
List of shipwrecks: 4 December 1785
Ship	State	Description
Charming Molly	Great Britain	The ship foundered in the Atlantic Ocean. Her ten crew were rescued three days later by the brig Basil (Great Britain). Charming Molly was on a voyage from Bermuda to the Turks Islands.

=== 6 December ===
List of shipwrecks: 6 December 1785
Ship	State	Description
Elizabeth	Great Britain	The ship ran aground on the Lap Sand, off Elsinore, Denmark. She was refloated on 17 December.
Montagu	British East India Company	The East Indiaman was destroyed by an explosion at Diamond Point, Bengal, India.

=== 7 December ===
List of shipwrecks: 7 December 1785
Ship	State	Description
Harmony	Great Britain	The ship was run down and sunk in the River Thames by a collier. She was on a voyage from Hull, Yorkshire to London.

=== 9 December ===
List of shipwrecks: 9 December 1785
Ship	State	Description
Hawke	Great Britain	The ship was lost near St. Ives, Cornwall with some loss of life. She was on a voyage from Falmouth, Cornwall to Bristol, Gloucestershire.

=== 13 December ===
List of shipwrecks: 13 December 1785
Ship	State	Description
Oak	Great Britain	The sloop was driven ashore at Great Yarmouth, Norfolk with the loss of her captain. She was on a voyage from Hull, Yorkshire to Great Yarmouth.
Two unnamed vessels	Great Britain	The ships were driven ashore in St. Andrew's Bay.
Two unnamed vessels	Great Britain	The ships were driven ashore at Lindisfarne, Northumberland.
Unnamed	Great Britain	The ship foundered in the North Sea off the coast of Northumberlan.
Unnamed	Great Britain	The collier foundered in the North Sea off the coast of County Durham.

=== 14 December ===
List of shipwrecks: 14 December 1785
Ship	State	Description
Peggy	Great Britain	The ship was driven ashore and severely damaged at Youghal, County Cork, Ireland. She was on a voyage from Virginia, United States to Whitehaven, Cumberland.

=== 15 December ===
List of shipwrecks: 15 December 1785
Ship	State	Description
Reserve	Great Britain	The ship was wrecked on the Wicklow Bank, in the Irish Sea. Her crew were rescued. She was on a voyage from Waterford, Ireland to Whitehaven, Cumberland.

=== 22 December ===
List of shipwrecks: 22 December 1785
Ship	State	Description
Providence	Great Britain	The ship was driven ashore and wrecked at Devil's Point, Devon. She was on a voyage from Liverpool, Lancashire to Plymouth, Devon.

=== 26 December ===
List of shipwrecks: 26 December 1785
Ship	State	Description
George	Great Britain	The ship was wrecked on the Sand Hale, in the Humber. She was on a voyage from King's Lynn, Norfolk to Faro, Portugal.
Sans Souce	Danzig	The ship was wrecked on Anholt, Denmark. She was on a voyage from Liverpool, Lancashire, Great Britain to Danzig.

=== 28 December ===
List of shipwrecks: 28 December 1785
Ship	State	Description
Hubbert	Great Britain	The ship was lost near Huelva, Spain. There were seven survivors She was on a voyage from London to Cádiz, Spain.
St. Anna St. Christo	Portugal	The ship was abandoned in the Atlantic Ocean. Her crew were rescued by Mercury (Great Britain). St. Anna St. Christo was on a voyage from Brazil to Lisbon.
Tom	Great Britain	The ship was lost at Aveiro, Portugal. She was on a voyage from Newfoundland, British America to Figueira da Foz, Portugal.
Warrior	Great Britain	The ship was wrecked in the Gulf of St. Lawrence. Her crew were rescued. She was on a voyage from St. John's Island, British America to Cádiz.

=== 31 December ===
List of shipwrecks: 31 December 1785
Ship	State	Description
Biddy	Great Britain	The ship was driven ashore at Newcastle-upon-Tyne, Northumberland and was wrecked.
Harriot	Great Britain	The ship foundered in the North Sea. Her crew were rescued.

=== Unknown date ===
List of shipwrecks: Unknown date in December 1785
Ship	State	Description
Adventure	Great Britain	The ship was lost near Waterford, Ireland with the loss of a crew member.
Esperança	Portugal	The ship was lost 3 nautical miles (5.6 km) from Calais, France. Her crew were rescued. She was on a voyage from Saint Petersburg, Russia to Lisbon.
Fortitude	Great Britain	The ship was lost near Lofthouse, Yorkshire. She was on a voyage from Leith, Lothian to Hull, Yorkshire.
Fortune	Great Britain	The ship foundered in the North Sea. She was on a voyage from Gothenburg, Sweden to London.
Friends Advance	Great Britain	The ship was driven ashore and wrecked at Great Yarmouth, Norfolk. She was on a voyage from Saint Petersburg to Bilbao, Spain.
Generous Friends	Great Britain	The ship was driven ashore near Orfordness, Suffolk. She was on a voyage from Ostend, Dutch Republic to North Shields, County Durham.
Harriot	Great Britain	The ship foundered in the English Channel 3 nautical miles (5.6 km) off Calais. Her crew were rescued.
Industry	Great Britain	The brig foundered in the Irish Sea off Galloway with the loss of eight lives.
Jenny	Great Britain	The ship was driven ashore and wrecked at Woodside, Cheshire.
John & Mary	Great Britain	The ship was driven ashore near North Shields. She was on a voyage from Gothenburg to London. John & Mary was refloated and taken in to North Shields.
Jonge Catharina	Dutch Republic	The ship was lost whilst on a voyage from Le Havre, France to Rotterdam.
Lady's Adventure	Great Britain	The ship was driven ashore crewless at Ventava, Duchy of Courland and Semigallia. She was on a voyage from "Wyburg" to Liverpool, Lancashire.
Magdalena	Great Britain	The ship departed from a port in Norway. No further trace, presumed foundered with the loss of all hands. Magdalena was on a voyage from Saint Petersburg to L'Orient, France.
Morning Star	Great Britain	The ship was driven ashore at Great Yarmouth. She was later refloated and taken in to that port.
Polly	Great Britain	The ship was wrecked in the North Sea off Dunbar, Lothian.
Pro Patria	Sweden	The ship was wrecked on the Lemon Bank. She was on a voyage from Stockholm to London.
Providence	Great Britain	The ship was destroyed by fire in the Hamoaze.
Resolution	Great Britain	The ship was driven ashore at Great Yarmouth. She was on a voyage from Copenhagen, Denmark to Ostend. Resolution was later refloated and taken in to Great Yarmouth.
Sara Adelgunda	Danzig	The ship was lost near Calais. She was on a voyage from Danzig to Plymouth, Devon, Great Britain.
Struan	Great Britain	The ship was wrecked on the Middle Ground, in the North Sea off the coast of Essex. She was on a voyage from Banff, Aberdeenshire to London.
Tom	Great Britain	The ship was wrecked near Dungeness. Kent. She was on a voyage from Jamaica to London.
True Briton	Great Britain	The ship was lost on the Sand Hammer, off the coast of Sweden with the loss of three of her crew. She was on a voyage from Danzig to Lisbon, Portugal.
Vrienden Wensh	Dutch Republic	The ship was driven ashore and wrecked at Great Yarmouth.
Unnamed	Dutch Republic	The ship foundered off Calais. Her crew were rescued.

== Unknown date ==
List of shipwrecks: Unknown date in 1785
Ship	State	Description
Alexander	Great Britain	The ship foundered off the coast of Norway. Her crew were rescued.
Ally	Great Britain	African slave trade: The ship capsized at New Calabar with 139 slaves on board.
Apollo	Great Britain	The ship was wrecked on Glover's Reef, in the Bay of Honduras. She was on a voyage from British Honduras to London.
Assistance	Great Britain	The ship was lost in the Black River, Jamaica. She was on a voyage from the Musquito Shore to London.
Beaver	Great Britain	The whaler foundered off Greenland. Some of her crew were rescued.
Betsey	Great Britain	The ship was lost on Barbuda. She was on a voyage from Charleston, South Carolina, United States to Savannah, Georgia, and Barbados.
Betsey	United States	The ship was lost at Saint Kitts. She was on a voyage from Philadelphia, Pennsylvania to Saint Kitts.
Cato	Great Britain	The ship foundered in the Atlantic Ocean. She was on a voyage from the West Indies to Virginia, United States.
Coleman	Great Britain	The ship was lost at Newfoundland, British America.
Dart	Great Britain	African slave trade: The ship capsized in a squall south of Cayenne, French Guiana. She was carrying 140 slaves, but only five crew survived. She was on a voyage from Africa to the West Indies.
Dispatch	Great Britain	The ship was lost at George Town, South Carolina, United States. She was bound for London.
Dolphin	Great Britain	The ship foundered off the coast of Loango, Africa.
Fame	Great Britain	The ship was lost on the coast of Africa.
Fanny	Great Britain	The ship foundered in the Atlantic Ocean. Her crew were rescued and landed at Boston, Massachusetts, United States. She was on a voyage from Charleston to Liverpool, Lancashire.
Fanny	Great Britain	The ship foundered whilst on a voyage from Boston, Massachusetts to the West Indies. Her crew were rescued by Kitty (Great Britain)
Friendly Adventure	Great Britain	The ship was lost on the Bahama Banks. Her crew were rescued. She was on a voyage from Jamaica to London.
Friendly Adventure	Great Britain	The whaler foundered off Greenland. Her crew were rescued.
Friendship	Ireland	The ship was lost at Havana, Cuba. She was on a voyage from Jamaica to Dublin.
George	Great Britain	The ship was lost whilst on a voyage from Ostend, Dutch Republic to Virginia.
Gibson	Great Britain	The whaler was lost off the coast of Brazil with some loss of life.
Good-Intent	Great Britain	African slave trade The ship was plundered by her slaves at "Goboon" and was then burnt. Her captain was the only survivor.
Good-Intent	Great Britain	The ship was lost at Newfoundland.
Grange	Great Britain	The ship was wrecked at Cape Charles, Virginia. She was on a voyage from the Clyde to Virginia.
Henry	Great Britain	The ship was lost at Newfoundland.
Hero	Great Britain	The ship was driven ashore in the James River, Virginia. She was on a voyage from Virginia to London.
Honduras	Great Britain	The ship foundered in the Atlantic Ocean (48°30′N 26°0′W). Her crew were rescued by the brig Jenny (Great Britain).
Hope	Great Britain	The ship foundered in the Atlantic Ocean. She was on a voyage from Antigua to Virginia.
John	Great Britain	The ship ran aground off John's Point, Jamaica and was wrecked. She was on a voyage from Jamaica to Bristol, Gloucestershire.
Kelly	Great Britain	The ship foundered off Greenland. Her crew were rescued.
Kingston	Great Britain	The ship foundered in the Atlantic Ocean off Bermuda. She was on a voyage from North Carolina, United States to Jamaica.
Lyon	Great Britain	The whaler foundered off Greenland.
Lord Charlemont	Ireland	The ship sank in the Nanticoke River, Maryland, United States. She was on a voyage from Dublin to Maryland.
Lord Middleton	Great Britain	The ship was lost at St. John's, Newfoundland. She was on a voyage from London to Halifax, Nova Scotia.
Marquis de Castries	France	The ship was lost in the Caicos Islands. She was on a voyage from Cap François, Saint-Domingue to Bordeaux.
Nostra Señora del Rosario	Spain	The ship foundered off New York, United States. She was on a voyage from Tenerife, Canary Islands to New York.
Peggy	Great Britain	The ship was lost whilst on a voyage from Halifax to Par Town, New Brunswick, British America.
Polly	Great Britain	The ship was destroyed by fire at Savannah, Georgia. She was on a voyage from Savannah to London.
Port Maria	Great Britain	The ship was wrecked on the Jardines. Her crew were rescued. She was on a voyage from Jamaica to London.
President	Great Britain	The ship was lost between Cape Breton Island and St. John's Island, British America.
Prince of Wales	Great Britain	The ship was lost whilst on a voyage from Halifax to Shelburne, Nova Scotia.
Providence	Great Britain	The ship foundered in the Atlantic Ocean. Her crew were rescued by Little Joe(Great Britain). Providence was on a voyage from Charleston to London.
Quebec	Great Britain	The ship was lost on "Bannaco Island". She was on a voyage from British Honduras to Bristol.
Rodney	Great Britain	The ship ran aground on the Samphire Reefs, off the coast of New Jersey, United States. She was on a voyage from East Florida to Jamaica.
Rose	United States	The ship was wrecked at Round Rock, Barbados.
Ross Packet	Great Britain	The ship was lost in Boston Bay, Massachusetts. She was on a voyage from Newfoundland to New York.
Savanna	Great Britain	The ship was lost in the Mississippi River. She was on a voyage from Jamaica to New Orleans, Louisiana, New France.
St. Louis	France	The ship was lost on the coast of the United States. She was on a voyage from Dunkirk to Philadelphia.
Sv. Evpl	Russian Empire	The vessel was lost in Pankov Harbor (52°04′N 173°30′W) on the Bering Sea coast of Amlia in the eastern Andreanof Islands in the western Catherine Archipelago. Her crew survived.
Swift	Great Britain	The ship was lost near the Cameroons, Africa.
Thompson	Great Britain	The ship was lost in Saint Ann's Bay, Jamaica. She was on a voyage from Jamaica to London.
Three Friends	Great Britain	The ship foundered in the Atlantic Ocean. Her crew were rescued. She was on a voyage from Georgia to Amsterdam.
Unnamed	France	The brig foundered at sea. Her crew were rescued by Faithful Steward (Ireland). The brig was on a voyage from Ostend to Philadelphia.
