= Roe (1801 ship) =

British slave and merchant ship (1801–1814)

History

France
- Launched: 1792
- Captured: c.1801

United Kingdom
- Name: Roe
- Acquired: 1801 by purchase of a prize
- Fate: Wrecked 3 August 1814

General characteristics
- Tons burthen: 391, or 392 (bm)
- Complement: 1801:20; 1804:25; 1807:30; 1812:30
- Armament: 1801:14 × 6–pounder + 4 × 12–pounder guns + 2 × 18–pounder carronades; 1801:14 × 6–pounder guns; 1804:12 × 6–pounder guns; 1807:14 × 6–pounder guns; 1812:14 × 9–pounder guns

Roe was launched in France in 1792, almost certainly under another name. The British captured her and between 1801 and 1808 she became a Liverpool based slave ship, making four voyages in the triangular trade in enslaved people. After the end of the British slave trade Roe traded with Brazil. The Americans captured her in 1812 but she was quickly recaptured. She was wrecked in November 1814.

== Career ==
Roe first appeared in Lloyd's Register (LR) in 1801 with A.Nicholson, master, John Shaw, owner, and trade Liverpool–Africa. In 1797 Shaw had owned an earlier slave ship named Roe that the French had captured in 1798 after she had delivered enslaved people to Demerara.

=== 1st voyage transporting enslaved people (1801–1802) ===
Captain Alexander Nicholson acquired a letter of marque on 24 September 1801. He sailed from Liverpool for West Africa on 19 November. In 1802, 147 vessels sailed from British ports bound for Africa to transport enslaved people; 122 of these vessels sailed from Liverpool.

Roe arrived at Havana on 20 June 1802, where she landed 350 captives. She sailed from Havana on 29 July, and arrived back at Liverpool on 13 September. She had left with 36 crewmen and she suffered two crew deaths on her voyage.

=== 2nd voyage transporting enslaved people (1802–1804) ===
Captain Thomas Molyneux sailed from Liverpool on 30 December 1802, bound for West Africa. In 1802, 155 vessels sailed from British ports bound for Africa to transport enslaved people; 122 of these vessels sailed from Liverpool.

Roe arrived in Kingston, Jamaica on 26 November 1803 and there disembarked 343 captives. She sailed from Kingston on 22 March 1804, and arrived back at Liverpool on 20 May. She had left with 3 crew members and suffered six deaths on the voyage.

=== 3rd voyage transporting enslaved people (1805–1806) ===
Captain James Irwin acquired a letter of marque on 10 November 1804. He sailed from Liverpool on 14 January 1805, bound for the Congo River. Roe arrived at Suriname 28 October 1805 and landed 347 captives. She left Suriname on 30 April 1806 and arrived back at Liverpool on 9 June. She had left Liverpool with 55 crew members and she suffered 13 crew deaths on the voyage. Roe underwent repairs in 1806.

=== 4th voyage transporting enslaved people (1807–1808) ===
Captain John Harvey acquired a letter of marque on 16 January 1807. He sailed from Liverpool on 21 January 1807, bound for West Africa. Between 1 January 1806 and 1 May 1807, 185 vessels cleared Liverpool outward bound in the slave trade. Thirty of these vessels made two voyages during this period. Of the 155 vessels, 114 were regular slave ships, like Roe having made two voyages during the period, or voyages before 1806.

Roe arrived at Kingston on 26 August and landed 315 captives there. She left on 26 April 1808 and arrived back at Liverpool on 2 Jul. At some point on the voyage Captain James Higgins replaced Captain Harvey.

The Slave Trade Act 1807 ended Britain's participation in the Trans-Atlantic slave trade. The last vessel to sail from Liverpool on a legal slave trading voyage was Kitty's Amelia, which left Liverpool on 27 July 1807.

=== Mercantile trade ===
Although both Lloyd's Register and the Register of Shipping continued to carry stale information showing Harvey as master and Roe's trade as Liverpool–Africa, both master and trade changed. Roe, Bateman, master, arrived at Rio de Janeiro on 6 July 1810.

Year	Master	Owner	Trade	Source & notes
1810	J. Harvey; Bateman	Shaw & Co.	Liverpool–Africa; Liverpool–Brazils	LR; repairs 1806 and thorough repair 1810
1812	Bateman; J.Berry	Kinneder	Liverpool–Brazils	LR; large repair 1810

Captain John Oberry acquired a letter of marque on 6 August 1812.

On 28 November, the American privateer Bona, John Dameron, master, of seven guns and 90 men, captured Roe, Oberry, master, to windward of Barbados. Roe was sailing from Liverpool to Madeira. An American account stated that when Bona fired on Roe Bona's pivot gun burst. Dameron then put 29 officers and men into boats and they boarded Roe. There was some fighting but negligible casualties before Roe struck. Dameron sighted two strange sails coming up so he left the prize crew on Roe and sailed away in an attempt to draw the approaching vessels after him.

The British recaptured Roe and sent her into Barbados. Roe sailed from Barbados for Martinique on 30 December. (Note: An American account of the capture doubled Roe's size and number of guns.)

== Fate ==
On 3 August 1814, Roe, Oberry, master, ran ashore at Liverpool while on a voyage from Liverpool to Pensacola. She was totally wrecked but her cargo was able to be landed.
