= Saville (ship) =

Several vessels have been named Saville (or Savile, or Savill):

- Saville (1777 ship) was launched in 1777 at Bristol as a West Indiaman. In 1778 to 1779 she sailed as a privateer and made two captures. She then returned to trading. She suffered two maritime incidents, one in 1784, and a second in August 1785, when she was lost at Port Maria, Jamaica.
- Saville (1778 ship) (or Savile) was launched in 1773 in New Jersey, under another name. In 1778 Samuel Enderby purchased a vessel named Rockhampton, which may or may not have been the launch-name, and renamed her Saville. Saville then made four voyages as a whaler in the British southern whale fishery. Between the second and third the French captured her, but a British privateer recaptured her. Saville returned to England in 1785 and was last listed circa 1787.
- Savill (1803 ship), of 143 tons (bm), was launched at Shields in 1803. She was captured on 16 January 1806 while she was sailing from Riga to London, and taken into Holland.
