= Nancy Perriam =

- Born: Ann Letton; April 1769; Exmouth, Devon
- Died: January 24, 1865 (aged 95); Exmouth, Devon
- Burial place: Littleham, Devon
- Other name: Ann Perriam
- Spouses: Edward Hopping (m. 1788–1802) John Perriam (m. 1805)
- Military career
- Allegiance: United Kingdom
- Branch: Royal Navy
- Service years: 1795–
- Units: HMS Crescent; HMS Orion
- Conflicts: French Revolutionary Wars; Battle of Groix; Battle of Cape St. Vincent; Battle of the Nile
- Other work: Fish seller

Nancy Perriam (April 1769 – January 24, 1865) was an English woman who served in Royal Navy warships during the Napoleonic Wars. Born Ann Letton and also known as Ann Perriam, she originated from Exmouth, Devon. She fought in several notable naval battles, including the Battle of the Nile in 1798, serving as a powder monkey and medical assistant. When not in battle she assisted with the domestic needs of officers. In retirement Perriam worked as a street seller of fish; she was one of three women denied the Naval General Service Medal in 1847 because of their sex.

== Life ==
=== Military service ===
Ann Letton was born in April 1769 in Exmouth, Devon; she went by the forename Nancy. Letton married the Royal Navy seaman Edward Hopping in 1788. Hopping served in the 36-gun frigate HMS Crescent, commanded by Captain James Saumarez. With the French Revolutionary Wars ongoing, in 1795 Crescent returned to England for repairs after serving off the coast of France. From there Letton, as a woman of good character and wife of one of the crew members, was allowed to come on board Crescent and sail with her husband.

Later in the same year Saumarez was given command of a different ship, the 74-gun ship of the line HMS Orion. He brought Hopping with him and thus Letton also joined Orion. Also serving in the ship was her brother. Letton continued with her husband, who served as the second gunner in Orion, during battles helping to prepare gun cartridges for the guns as a powder monkey.

Letton fought in such a role at the Battle of Groix on 23 June the same year, at the Battle of Cape St. Vincent on 14 February 1797, and at the Battle of the Nile on 1 August 1798. When not in battle Letton was employed with domestic duties on behalf of Saumarez and his officers. As they went into battle at Cape St. Vincent she was mending one of Saumarez's shirts, and subsequently during that battle also assisted with the tending of the wounded. She recalled how while assisting the ship's surgeon with an operation on an injured midshipman:

"the boy bore the operation without a murmur, and when it was over turned to me and said: 'Have I not borne it like a man?' Having said this he immediately expired."

=== Retirement ===
Hopping drowned in 1802, and Letton instead married John Perriam in 1805. Now known as Nancy, or Ann, Perriam, after her second husband also died she worked as a street seller of fish in Exmouth until the age of 80 when she retired, unable to continue to work. Locals campaigned for her to receive a government pension for her service, and in retirement she was given £10 a year.

In 1847 the Naval General Service Medal was created for veterans of the Napoleonic Wars. It was stipulated that anyone "without any reservation as to sex" would be entitled to the award. Perriam was one of three women who applied to receive the medal, alongside Nile veteran Mary Anne Ridley and Battle of Trafalgar veteran Jane Townshend. Admiral of the Fleet Sir Thomas Byam Martin was appointed to consider applications for the medal; his committee was initially going to accept Townshend's request because of strong testimonies from her ex-captain. This decision was reversed, likely because of disapproval from Queen Victoria who was an opponent of burgeoning women's rights. Martin wrote that "there were too many people in the fleet equally useful and it will leave the army exposed to innumerable applications of the same nature".

Historian Suzanne J. Stark argues that this reasoning was "clearly nonsense", highlighting that Daniel Tremendous McKenzie received the medal because he was born on board the 74-gun ship of the line HMS Tremendous during the Glorious First of June. His rank on the medal roll is listed as "baby"; when Perriam and Ridley sent in their applications for the medal they were immediately refused. Perriam died on 24 January 1865, aged 95, having outlived all of her children. She left a will worth £100. Perriam was buried in Littleham churchyard.
