= Tartar (1780 ship) =

British merchantman and whaler 1780–1801

History

Great Britain
- Builder: France
- Launched: 1778
- Acquired: 1780 by purchase of a prize
- Fate: Probably lost in 1799; last listed 1801

General characteristics
- Tons burthen: 460, or 480, 483, or 494, or 49419/94 or 500, or 600 (bm)
- Length: Overall:116 ft 10 1/4 in (35.6 m); Keel:93 ft 0 1/4 in (28.4 m)
- Beam: 31 ft 7 1/2 in (9.6 m)
- Depth of hold: 13 ft 8 in (4.2 m)
- Complement: 20
- Armament: 1781:26 × 9-pounder guns + 6 × 9-pounder carronades; 1794:14 × 6-pounder guns
- Notes: Two decks

Tartar was built in France in 1778, almost surely under another name. She was taken in prize and appears under British ownership in 1780. After a short career as a privateer, she made a voyage between 1781 and 1783 as an extra East Indiaman for the British East India Company (EIC). She then became a whaler in the northern whale fishery (Greenland and Davis Strait). After whaling she traded with the Baltic and then served as a London-based transport. She was probably lost in 1799, and was last listed in 1801. If Tartar is the vessel lost in 1799, in 1796 French warships captured her, but the Royal Navy quickly recaptured her.

== Career ==
Missing volumes and missing pages in extant volumes result in Tarter having first appeared in Lloyd's Register (LR) in the 1781 volume. One source reports that Tartar was built in France in 1778 and taken in prize the same year. Then John Fiott, St. Helier, Jersey, purchased her and used her as a privateer until the EIC took her up. The only Tartar appearing in LR in 1778 owned by a Fiott was Tartar, of 200 tons (bm), and reported as "old". Her trade was given as Straits [of Gibraltar]–London. There is no mention of a Tartar, Fiott, master in 1779 or 1780, but that may be due to missing pages. Unfortunately, Tartar was a common name for privateers, In 1778 and 1779 newspapers mention British privateers named Tartar from Alderney, Bristol, Cork, Dover, Falmouth, Folkestone, Hastings, Liverpool, London, and Penzance. There was also at least one American one, from Savannah.

The first mention in the press of what is almost surely the Tartar of this article was in March 1780. The item stated that the ship Tartar, of 600 tons (bm), was fitting out on the Thames as a private ship of war of 32 guns and 250 men. The command of the frigate Tartar had been given to Captain Fiott. Tartar had acquired a letter of marque on 17 January 1780.

In May 1780 Lloyd's List reported that Tartar, Fiot, master, had taken and sent into Dartmouth Catharina Maria, a Dutch ship sailing from Alicant to Havre-de-Grace with a cargo of barilla, etc. On 15 June, Tartar Fiott, master, during a fog, fell in with French squadron consisting of seven ships of the line and three frigates that chased him. He was able to escape into Lisbon.

On 1 September 1780 Tartar, Fiott, master, arrived at Dartmouth, from Lisbon.

Year	Master	Owner	Trade	Source
1781	E.Fiott	DeGruchie	London–West Indies	LR

In 1780 the EIC took up Tartar as an extra ship for one voyage. It had Batson repair her.

Captain Edward Fiott sailed from Plymouth on 26 June 1781, bound for Madras and Bengal. On 18 September Tartar was at São Thomé and on 17 November St Helena. She reached Madras on 31 March 1782 and left on 14 May. (Note: There was a report that Tartar (22 guns), Prince William (24 guns), and the armed ship Charlotte, in the EIC's service, were stationed to escort the ships sailing from China to Madras. Unfortunately the news item does not give a date or location, though the date of the story would be consistent with the delay for news from March to reach England from Madras. It would also explain why she was at Madras for more than six weeks.) She touched Ganjam on 19 May and arrived at Calcutta on 26 July. Homeward bound, she was at Culpee on 26 December. She was at St Helena between 29 March and 9 June 1783, and arrived back at the Downs on 7 August. (Note: Hackman mistakenly assigns to the Tartar of this article a voyage for the EIC that a different Tartar had performed.)

As of December 2022 it is unclear what Tartar was doing between her return from her voyage for the EIC and 1785-1786 when a new owner, Wilkinson, sailed her as a whaler in the Northern Whale Fishery.

Year	Master	Owner	Trade	Source & notes	Whales	Tuns blubber
1786	J.Dearon	Wilkinson	London–Greenland	LR		
1787	J.Dodson; A.M'Nilage	Wilkinson	London–Greenland	LR	3	70
1788	M'neilage				4	10
1789	M'nillage	Wilkinson	London–Davis Strait	LR; damage repaired 1787		
1790	M'nillage; J.Knowles	Wilkinson	London–Davis Strait; London–Memel	LR; damage repaired 1787		

Wilkinson gave up on whaling and turned Tartar to trading.

Year	Master	Owner	Trade	Source & notes
1791	J.Knowles	Wilkinson	London–Memel	LR
1792	J.Knowles; W.Wallace	Wilkinson	London–Memel	LR; damage repaired 1787 & good repair 1792
1793	Wallace	Captain & Company	London–Ostend	LR; damage repaired 1787 & good repair 1792
1793	Wallace	Captain & Company	London–Ostend	LR; damage repaired 1787 & good repair 1792

Captain Thomas Gooch acquired a letter of marque on 28 July 1794.

Year	Master	Owner	Trade	Source & notes
1795	T.Gooch	J. Hadfield	London transport	LR; damage repaired 1787 & good repair 1792

Gooch last appeared as master of Tartar on Lloyd's List's ship arrival and departure (SAD) data in April 1795. It reported that she had arrival in Gibraltar from Plymouth and then had reached Corsica. Although Gooch does not appear in LR as Tartar's master Ashington first appeared in the SAD data in end-March, sailing for the West Indies. LR has no listing for a Tartar with Ashington, master.

In December 1796 as Tartar, Ashington, master, was returning to London from Demerara, two French warships (probably from the French expedition to Ireland (1796)), captured her off Cape Clear. HMS Virginie and Jason, and possibly also HMS Unite, recaptured her and sent her into Plymouth. Tartar arrived there on 13 January 1797.

In October 1797, the West Indiaman Tartar, Ashington, master, carried men of the 42nd Regiment of Foot and officers of the 18th, or Royal Irish Regiment, to join their units at Gibraltar.

In November 1798, Tartar arrived at Gibraltar after having been chased by a fleet of Spanish gunboats. She had left Portsmouth on 7 October, bound for Lisbon, Portugal, and the West Indies.

== Fate ==
In 1799 Tartar, Ashington, master, sustained damage as she crossed the bar at Demerara. She was subsequently condemned there.

Tartar was last listed in LR in 1801 with data unchanged since 1795.
