= Bona (1809 ship) =

History

United States
- Name: Bona
- Owner: John Gooding, Jas. Williams, Chas. Kalkman, Michael McBlair, John Hollins, Wm. Hollins, Wm. T. Graham, & Geo. J. Brown
- Builder: Baltimore
- Launched: 1809
- Captured: 13 March 1813

General characteristics
- Tons burthen: 112 (bm)
- Length: 76 ft 6 in (23.3 m)
- Beam: 19 ft 7 in (6.0 m)
- Sail plan: Schooner
- Complement: 70
- Armament: 1 × 9-pounder gun on a pivot + 6 × 12-pounder carronades

Bona was launched in 1809 at Baltimore. After the outbreak of war with the United Kingdom, Bona took to the sea twice. On her first voyage she cruised as a privateer, engaged in two actions, one of which resulted in taking a merchantman that she had to abandon. Her owners next sent her out as a letter of marque. During this voyage the British captured Bona.

== Career ==
1st cruise: Captain John Dameron commissioned Bona as a privateer on 18 July 1812. In August Dameron twice had to deal with insubordination amongst his crew. She stopped at Norfolk, Virginia, to acquire men for her crew. There she enrolled one black man, after he had provided proof that he was not a slave.

On 28 November the Baltimore privateer Tom (fourteen 12 and 18-pounder carronades, two 9-pounder guns, and 130 men) was in company with Bona when they encountered the Falmouth mail packet Townshend, M'Coy, master, about seven leagues west of Barbados. After an engagement of an hour and a half, Townshend struck. She had her master killed, three men dangerously wounded, three severely wounded, and her captain and six men slightly wounded. The Americans gave Townshend up. She returned to Falmouth, arriving there on 2 February 1813. Niles' Weekly Register reported that Townsend had her captain and four men killed, and several men wounded. Tom had only two men wounded. Townshend had 28 crew and passengers. Before she surrendered she threw here mails overboard but they were inadequately weighted and so floated where Bona could retrieve them. The Americans ransomed Townshend for $6,000. (Note: Townshend, of 189 tons (bm), was armed with ten 6&9-pounder guns.) Bona brought the mails to Baltimore.

On 28 November, Bona, of seven guns and 90 men, captured Roe, Oberry, master, to windward of Barbados. Roe was sailing from Liverpool to Madeira. An American account stated that when Bona fired on Roe Bona's pivot gun burst. Dameron then put 29 officers and men into boats and they boarded Roe. There was some fighting but negligible casualties before Roe struck. Dameron sighted two strange sails coming up so he left the prize crew on Roe and sailed away in an attempt to draw the approaching vessels after him.

The British recaptured Roe and sent her into Barbados. Roe sailed from Barbados for Martinique on 30 December. (Note: Roe, of 392 tons (bm), J.Oberry, master, was a French prize. Her trade was Liverpool–Madeira. An American account of the capture doubled Roe's size and number of guns.)

2nd cruise: Captain John Dameron commissioned Bona as a letter of marque on 7 January 1813. On this voyage too he had to deal with some insubordination. She cleared for Havana in January, with a cargo of flour and lard.

== Fate ==
HMS Maidstone captured Bona on 13 March 1813. Bona had sailed from Havana for Baltimore with a cargo of coffee and logwood. Maidstone sent Bona into Bermuda.
