= Thames (1794 ship) =

History

Great Britain

General characteristics
- Tons burthen: 365, or 379, or 386 (bm)
- Complement: 39
- Armament: 1800: 6 × 18-pounder carronades; 1803: 18 × 6-pounder guns + 4 swivel guns; 1805: 8 × 4-pounder + 2 × 6-pounder guns + 2 × 18-pounder carronades

Thames was launched in 1794 in London. The French captured her in late 1795, but the British Royal Navy recaptured her within a few weeks. She then disappeared from the registers for several years. She reappeared as Thames in 1800, sailing as a West Indiaman. In 1802, new owners sailed her as a slave ship in the triangular trade in enslaved people. She made one full voyage as a slave ship. French privateers captured her in 1805 after she had gathered captive in West Africa, but before she could deliver them to a port in the British Caribbean.

== Career ==
Thames first appeared in Lloyd's Register (LR) in 1794.

Year	Master	Owner	Trade	Source
1794	Atterbury	Tranham	London–Jamaica	LR

Between 21 and 30 September 1795, a squadron of French frigates captured several British merchantmen, Thames, Atterberry, master, among them. Shortly thereafter, HMS Orion recaptured Thames, Atterbury, master.

Thames then disappeared from LR and the Register of Shipping for some years. She reappeared in 1800.

Year	Master	Owner	Trade	Source
1800	J.Ferguson	Adam & Co.	London–Tobago	LR
1802	J.Ferguson; J.Welch	Adam & Co. J.&A.Anderson	London–Tobago; London–Africa	LR

1st voyage transporting enslaved people (1802–1804): Captain James Welsh sailed from London on 6 December 1802. Thames acquired captives at the Sierra Leone estuary and arrived at Kingston on 2 December 1803, with 341 captives. Welsh had received a letter of marque on 17 November. Thames left Kingston on 12 April 1804, and arrived back in London 28 May.

2nd slave voyage (1805): Captain Welsh sailed from London on 18 February 1805, bound for Africa.

== Fate ==
Two French schooners captured Thames, Welch, master, in late 1805 off Surinam. They took her into Guadeloupe.
