= Faithful Steward (ship) =

Merchant ship from the 1700s

Coordinates: 38.611°N 75.058°W

Faithful Steward was an 18th-century merchant ship that was wrecked off the coast of Delaware in 1785.

== History ==
Faithful Steward was an 18th-century merchant ship. In 1785 the ship departed Derry, Ireland for Philadelphia carrying 249 passengers in addition to the crew, along with 400 barrels filled with British copper halfpennies and rose gold guineas. After 53 days at sea, the ship arrived at off the Delaware Seashore. However, on the night of 1 September 1785 the ship became stuck on a shoal off of Cape Henlopen, near the mouth of the Indian River. Though the shoal was only several hundred feet from the shoreline, the coast was not monitored by any sort of lifeguard or rescue service, forcing the passengers of the ship to build rafts from the remains of the ship. By the morning of 3 September, 181 of the ship's passengers, including 93 women and children, and crew had died, leaving 68 survivors. The ship remained lodged on the shoal, where it eventually broke apart.

Following the loss of Faithful Stewart, the beach near where the ship was wrecked became known as Coin Beach due to the large number of copper coins that would wash ashore during storms.
