= Tartar (1778 ship) =

History

Great Britain
- Name: Tartar
- Launched: 1778, Bristol
- Captured: 1782

General characteristics
- Tons burthen: 110, or 160, or 200, or 250 (bm)
- Complement: 70, or 120
- Armament: 1778: 16 × 6-pounder guns + 10 swivel guns; 1781: 16 × 9-pounder + 4 × 3-pounder guns

Tartar was launched at Bristol in 1778. Initially she sailed, with some success, as a privateer. Then in 1781 she became a slave ship in the triangular trade in enslaved people. She made one complete voyage as an enslaving ship; French naval vessels captured Tartar on her second enslaving voyage.

== Career ==
Tartar first appeared in Lloyd's Register (LR), in 1778.

Year	Master	Owner	Trade	Source
1778	J[ohn] Chilcott, Jr.	Chilcott & Co.	Bristol privateer	LR

The British Admiralty had given notice in April 1777, that they were ready to issue letters of marque for privateers against the Americans. In March 1778, Great Britain broke off relations with France.

Tartar initially sailed as a privateer. Before Tartar sailed on her first and second cruises, her owners presented her captains with detailed instructions as to the conduct of the cruises. (Note: These instructions and a great deal of detailed information about provisioning, manning, and the like are discussed in an article by Bertram Rogers.)

On her first cruise, Tartar captured the American-built French brigantine Babet, which was sailing from Bordeaux to Martinique. Tartar was in company with another Bristol privateer, Albion, when they captured the snow Santa Maria.

Tartar, in company with the privateer Alexander, captured Ferme, prior to end-September 1778. Ferme was an East Indiaman, and so a major prize. Reportedly, she had been insured in London for £100,000. She was also the only major prize that Bristol privateers captured in 1778. (Note: Of the owners of the 14 Bristol privateers and seven letters-of-marque, all but one or two suffered disastrous losses in 1778 (prior to end-September).)

In November 1778 Tartar, in company with Saville, took a Swedish vessel that had been on her way from Venice to Bordeaux. They sent the prize into Kingroad, by Avonmouth.

In December, Tartar was off Ushant when she encountered a French frigate of 36 guns. After an engagement of one-and-a-half hours, the frigate left. Tartar had three men killed and several men wounded.

Year	Master	Owner	Trade	Source
1779	J.Chilcott; A[aron] Floyd (Note: Floyd went on to captain a second Bristol privateer named Tartar.)	Chilcott & Co.	Bristol privateer	LR

Captain Aaron Floyd acquired a letter of marque on 6 March 1779. (Note: Damer Powell states that in April Tartar was fitted out at Hilhouse Dock. However, the description of her having sails for both a schooner or lugger suggests that the vessel being fitted out was Tartar (1781 ship), with the fitting out having taken place in February 1781. Aaron Floyd had become captain of Tartar (1781 ship).)

On 19 September 1779 Tartar engaged an American privateer armed with thirty 6 and 9-pounder guns for two hours before the American vessel sailed away. Tartar had suffered three men killed and 13 wounded.

Next, Tartar captured St Antonio E. Almas, which was carrying tobacco from Ostend to Lisbon. Tartar sent her prize into King Road, off Avonmouth. The capture of St Antony Palmas, Sebastio Alfonso, master, took place on 24 September.

Year	Master	Owner	Trade	Source
1780	LR not available on line			
1781	Fraser	J.Anderson	Bristol–Africa	LR

New owners in late 1779 sailed Tartar as a slave ship. Captain James Fraser acquired a letter of marque on 17 December 1779. He sailed from Bristol on 13 March 1780 with a crew of 60 men. Tartar started acquiring captives at Cape Coast Castle on 23 November. (Note: The size of the crew and the more than six months between Tartar's departure from Bristol and her arrival at Cape Coast Castle raises the possibility that she initially cruised as a privateer before going on to acquire captives.) She embarked 250 captives and sailed from Africa on 1 February 1781. She arrived at Barbados on 30 March. From there she sailed to Montego Bay, Jamaica. She arrived at the West Indies with 54 crew and discharged 28 at Barbados or Jamaica. Tartar sailed from Jamaica on 18 July, and arrived back at Bristol on 20 September 1781 with 26 crew members. On the way home she took on 40 tons of rice and 500 skins seized from a Spanish vessel that had been sailing from the Spanish Main to Havana.

On this voyage, Alexander's surgeon was Alexander Falconbridge. This was the first of four voyages that he made on board slave ships, the last being in 1787. He became an abolitionist and in 1788 published an influential account of the trade in enslaved people.

Year	Master	Owner	Trade	Source & notes
1782	Fraser	J.Anderson	Africa–Bristol; Bristol–Africa	LR' lengthened 1782

== Loss ==
Captain Fraser sailed from Bristol on 12 March 1782, with a crew of 40 men. Lloyd's List reported in August 1782 that a French vessel of 40 guns, a frigate, and a cutter had captured Tartar, of Bristol, Fraser, master, off the coast of Africa. Tartar had resisted and the capture only occurred after she had lost 10 men killed and a number of wounded. The French put Fraser and his surviving crews on Rose, of Liverpool, Stephenson, master, which the French had taken on about 9 June. The French made a cartel of Rose and she arrived at Bristol with some 200 men. Other reports state that the captors were a French frigate, sloop-of-war, and cutter, and that the casualties on Tartar amounted to three men killed and five wounded. A third source identified the frigate as Surveillante and the sloop as Ariel, and placed the capture as taking place off Cape Mount, West Africa.
