= Tartar (1781 ship) =

British privateer and merchant ship 1781–1793

History

Great Britain
- Name: Tartar
- Launched: 1779, France
- Renamed: Friends (1782)
- Captured: 1782, and recaptured
- Fate: Last listed 1793

General characteristics
- Tons burthen: 60, or 80 (bm)
- Sail plan: Schooner
- Complement: 50 (1781)
- Armament: 14 × 6-pounder guns + 4 swivel guns (1781)

Tartar was built in France in 1779, probably under another name, and taken in prize. She was in 1781 briefly a Bristol-based privateer. A French privateer captured her, but a British privateer recaptured her. She then became the merchantman Friends, and traded between Bristol and North America, primarily Newfoundland. Friends was last listed in 1793.

== Career ==
Tartar first appeared in Lloyd's Register (LR), in 1781. She underwent fitting at Hilhouse, where she was fitted with sails to be able to sail as a lugger or schooner. Her first master was Aaron Floyd, who had been master on an earlier Bristol privateer named Tartar. Captain Aaron Floyd acquired a letter of marque on 10 February 1781.

Year	Master	Owner	Trade	Source & notes
1781	A. Floyd	Easton & Co	Bristol cruise	LR

Lloyd's List reported in March 1781 that the privateer Phoenix, of Dartmouth, Captain Pidgely, had captured a brig from Mauritius and recaptured the Bristol privateer Tartar, and brought them both into Penzance. Phoenix and Tartar had sailed from Bristol together on 19 March. The French privateer was Black Princess. (Note: Damer Powell assigns this capture and recapture to Tartar (1775 ship). However, a record of Tarter's privateering voyages does not mention the incident. This is not surprising as this capture/recapture took place after Tartar (1775 ship) had ceased privateering.)

Tartar was offered for sale at Falmouth in September.

Tartar then came under new ownership. Captain Doyle purchased her, renamed her Friends, and started sailing her between Bristol and Newfoundland.

Year	Vessel	Master	Owner	Trade	Source & notes
1782	Tartar	A.Floyd; Doyle	T.Easton & Co.	Bristol privateer	LR; now Friends
1782	Friends	Doyle	Captain & Co.	Bristol–Newfoundland	LR; former Tartar

By 1786 Friends was sailing between Bristol and Philadelphia, as well as Newfoundland. She underwent repairs in 1788.

Year	Master	Owner	Trade	Source & notes
1791	J.Doyle; J.Roche	Captain & Co.	Bristol–Newfoundland	LR; repairs 1788

== Fate ==
Friends was last listed in 1793.
