= Portuguese frigate Nossa Senhora da Graça =

Frigate of the Portuguese Navy (1787–1819)

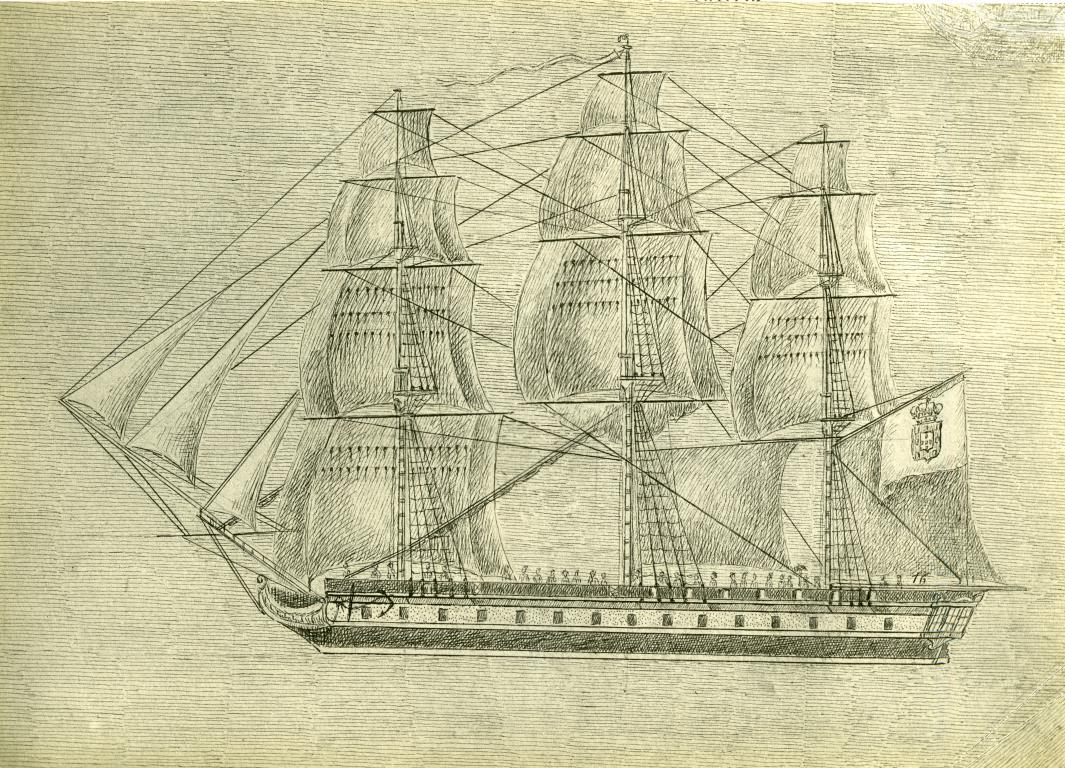
- Nossa Senhora da Graça in 1810

History

Portugal
- Name: Nossa Senhora da Graça; Nossa Senhora da Graça, a Fénix; Fénix
- Namesake: Our Lady of Grace and Phoenix
- Builder: Salvador
- Laid down: 25 April 1785
- Launched: 13 August 1787
- Fate: Burned, 1819

General characteristics
- Type: Frigate
- Tons burthen: 1,500
- Length: 49.07 m (161 ft 0 in)
- Beam: 12.80 m (42 ft 0 in)
- Sail plan: Full-rigged ship
- Complement: 379
- Armament: 46 guns

Nossa Senhora da Graça, commonly known as Fénix, was a 46-gun fifth-rate frigate of the Portuguese Navy, launched in Salvador on 13 August 1787. The frigate was seized by the French in 1807 during the Invasion of Portugal during the Napoleonic Wars. In 1808, the frigate was recaptured and returned to Portuguese service. In 1819, the frigate was no longer deemed serviceable and was burned.

== Design and description ==
Nossa Senhora da Graça was a fifth-rate frigate that had a crew of 240 men in 1788, and of 379 men in 1799. The frigate had 49.07 metres (161 ft 0 in) of length with a beam of 12.80 metres (42 ft 0 in) and measured 1,500 tons burthen. At construction, the frigate was armed with thirty 18-pounder (8.2 kg) guns and fourteen 9-pounder (4.1 kg) guns. It is also said to have been armed with 54 guns in 1805.

== Construction and career ==
The frigate was built in Salvador, laid down on 25 April 1785, and launched on 13 August 1787. In 1791, the frigate's hull was covered with copper plates from Sweden.

During the Napoleonic Wars, Nossa Senhora da Graça was seized by the French during the Invasion of Portugal, in 1807. However, when Lisbon was liberated the following year, the ship was returned to Portuguese service in September 1808.

In 1815, the frigate sailed to Brazil, carrying the Division of Royal Volunteers of the Prince's soldiers. The frigate returned to Salvador in late 1818, after thirty months of operating in southern Brazil. An inspection found the frigate useless, and in 1819 the ship was burned.
