= Canada-class ship of the line =

1765 class of British warship

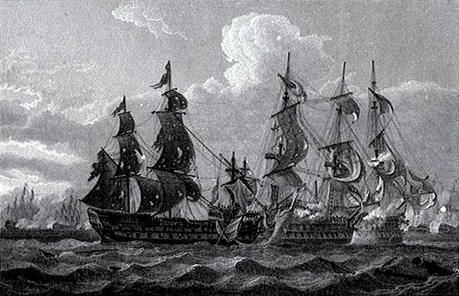
- HMS Captain capturing the San Nicolas and the San Josef at the Battle of Cape St Vincent, 14 February 1797

Class overview
- Name: Canada
- Operators: Royal Navy
- Preceded by: Arrogant class
- Succeeded by: Ramillies class
- In service: 17 September 1765 - 1834
- Completed: 4

General characteristics
- Type: Ship of the line
- Length: 170 ft (52 m) (gundeck); 133 ft (41 m) (keel)
- Beam: 46 ft 9 in (14.25 m)
- Propulsion: Sails
- Armament: 74 guns: Gundeck: 28 × 32-pounders; Upper gundeck: 28 × 18-pounders; Quarterdeck: 14 × 9-pounders; Forecastle: 4 × 9-pounders

The Canada-class ships of the line were a series of four 74-gun third rates designed for the Royal Navy by William Bateley. The name ship of the class was launched in 1765.

== Design ==
During this period in British naval architecture, the 74-gun third rates were divided into two distinct groupings: the 'large' and 'common' classes. The Canada-class ships belonged to the latter grouping, carrying 18-pounder guns on their upper gun decks, as opposed to the 24-pounders of the large class.

== Service ==
HMS Captain, made famous for Nelson's actions at the Battle of Cape St Vincent, belonged to this class of ships.

== Ships ==
- HMS Canada

Builder: Woolwich Dockyard
Ordered: 1 December 1759
Launched: 17 September 1765
Fate: Broken up, 1834

- HMS Majestic

Builder: Adams & Barnard, Deptford
Ordered: 23 August 1781
Launched: 11 December 1785
Fate: Broken up, 1816

- HMS Orion

Builder: Barnard, Deptford
Ordered: 2 October 1782
Launched: 1 June 1787
Fate: Broken up, 1814

- HMS Captain

Builder: Batson, Limehouse
Ordered: 14 November 1782
Launched: 26 January 1787
Fate: Burned and broken up, 1813
