= Thetis (1787 ship) =

History

Great Britain
- Name: Thetis
- Namesake: Thetis
- Launched: 1787, Stockton, or Hull
- Fate: Wrecked 28 February 1812

General characteristics
- Tons burthen: 226, or 236, or 250 (bm)
- Sail plan: Brig, later Snow
- Complement: 1801: 25
- Armament: 1801: 12 × 12&4-pounder cannons; 1809: 2 × 3-pounder guns + 2 × 18-pounder carronades

Thetis was launched in 1787 at Stockton-on-Tees, or Hull. Between 1787 and 1799 she sailed between London and Hamburg. Then, between 1799 and 1804 she made two voyages as a whaler in the British southern whale fishery. Afterwards she became a coaster, though she did make at least one voyage to Quebec. She was lost on 28 February 1812.

== Career ==
Thetis first appeared in Lloyd's Register (LR) in 1787. Between 1787 and 1799 she sailed between London and Hamburg.

Year	Master	Owner	Trade	Source & notes
1787	R.Capens	Taylor & Co.	London–Hamburg	LR
1794	R.Capens; J.Clark	Taylor & Co.	London–Hamburg	LR
1797	J.Clark; W.Linder, Jun.	Taylor & Co.	London–Hamburg	LR
1799	W.Linder; J.MacKay	Taylor & Co. Hill	London–Hamburg; London–South Seas	LR; small repairs 1798
1800	J.Mackay	T.Hill; Chisman & Co.	London–Hamburg	LR; small repairs 1798

1st whaling voyage (1799–1801): Captain Mackie sailed from London on 22 November 1799. Thetis, Mackay, master returned on 21 July 1801, arriving at Dover on 15 July from Saint Helena and the South Seas.

2nd whaling voyage (1801–1804): Captain Henry Mackie acquired a letter of marque on 19 September 1801. He sailed in late 1801 for the Pacific Ocean. Thetis was reported at Rio de Janeiro. She stopped at Rio for provisions and because of scurvy among the crew. Thetis, Mackie or Mackay, master, was several times reported at the Galápagos Islands. She returned to London on 9 July 1804, having come via St Helena.

On her return Timothy Cheesman sold Thetis to Pearson, and she became a coaster, after having undergone a good repair.

Year	Master	Owner	Trade	Source & notes
1805	Pearson	Pearson, Senior	Sunderland–London	Register of Shipping (RS); small repairs 1798
1805	Pearson	Pearson, Senior	Sunderland–London	RS; small repairs 1798, & good repair 1804
1809	Pearson; Vallens	Pearson, Senior	Sunderland–London	RS; good repair 1804, large repair 1806, & repairs 1809

Although this data remained unchanged to the last listing of Thetis in 1811, it may be inaccurate. In 1811, Thetis, Pearson, master, made a voyage to Quebec and arrived back at Gravesend on 30 November.

== Fate ==
On 25 February 1812 the snow Thetis, Pearson, master, of South Shields, was lost on the Platter Sand, near Harwich. She was carrying coals and glass from Hull to London. Her crew was saved.
