= HMS Orion (1787) =

Ship of the line of the Royal Navy

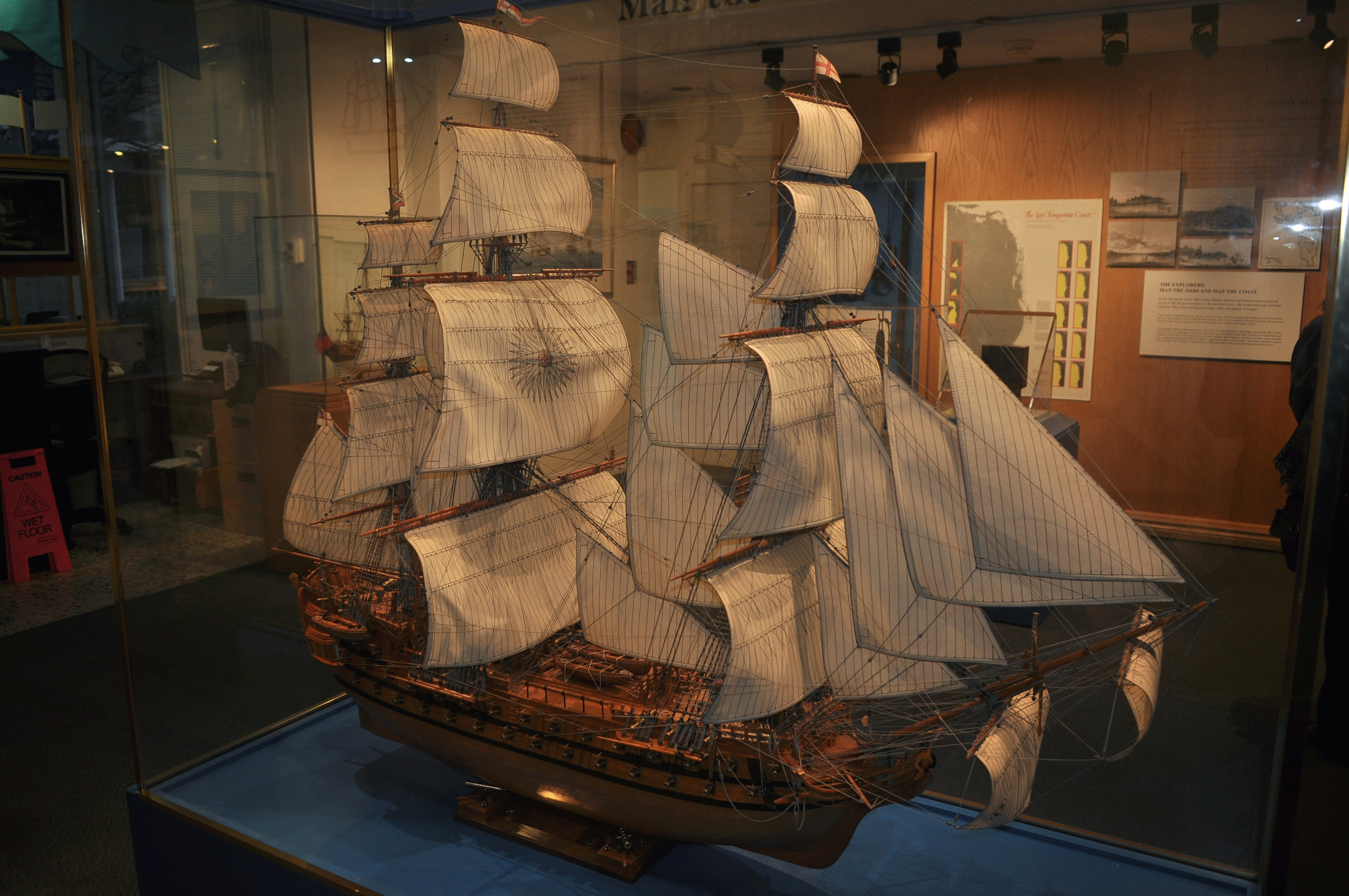
- Model of HMS Orion at the Vancouver Maritime Museum

History

Great Britain
- Name: HMS Orion
- Ordered: 2 October 1782
- Builder: Barnard, Deptford
- Laid down: February 1783
- Launched: 1 June 1787
- Honours and awards: Participated in: Glorious First of June; Battle of Groix; Battle of Cape St. Vincent; Battle of the Nile; Battle of Trafalgar
- Fate: Broken up, 1814

General characteristics
- Class & type: Canada-class ship of the line
- Tons burthen: 1,646 (bm)
- Length: 170 ft (52 m) (gundeck)
- Beam: 46 ft 9 in (14.25 m)
- Depth of hold: 20 ft 6 in (6.25 m)
- Propulsion: Sails
- Sail plan: Full-rigged ship
- Armament: Gundeck: 28 × 32-pounder guns; Upper gundeck: 28 × 18-pounder guns; QD: 14 × 9-pounder guns; Fc: 4 × 9-pounder guns

HMS Orion was a 74-gun third rate ship of the line of the British Royal Navy, launched at Deptford on 1 June 1787 to the design of the Canada class, by William Bately. She took part in all the major actions of the French Revolutionary and Napoleonic Wars under a series of distinguished captains.

In 1794 she fought at the Glorious First of June under Captain John Thomas Duckworth.

Orion was at Plymouth on 20 January 1795 and so shared in the proceeds of the detention of the Dutch naval vessels, East Indiamen, and other merchant vessels that were in port on the outbreak of war between Britain and the Netherlands.

Later in 1795, Captain James Saumarez was appointed in command. Under Saumarez, Orion took part in the defeat of the French fleet at the Battle of Groix off Lorient on 22 June.

In October 1795 Orion recaptured the merchantman Thames, Atterbury, master, which had been among a number of vessels that a French frigate squadron had captured in late September.

Nancy Perriam, one of the very few women to serve on a Royal Navy ship during the Coalition Wars, served on the Orion under Saumarez during this period.

In early 1797 Orion joined the Mediterranean Fleet and distinguished herself at the Battle of Cape St. Vincent on 14 February. She then took part in the blockade of Cádiz from March 1797 to April 1798, when she was sent into the Mediterranean as part of a small squadron under the command of Rear-Admiral Horatio Nelson. In August, Nelson finally caught up with the French fleet, resulting in the Battle of the Nile, where Captain Saumarez was wounded.

In October 1805, now under Captain Edward Codrington, she took part in the Battle of Trafalgar where, with Ajax, she forced the surrender of the French 74-gun ship Intrépide.

After Trafalgar, Orion continued in the blockade of Cádiz. On 25 November, Thunderer detained the Ragusan ship Nemesis, which was sailing from Isle de France to Leghorn, Italy, with a cargo of spice, indigo dye, and other goods. Orion shared the prize money with ten other British warships.

== Fate ==
Orion was broken up in 1814.

== In popular culture ==
In the Patrick O'Brian novel Post Captain, Capt. Jack Aubrey says he was third lieutenant aboard HMS Orion at the Battle of Cape St. Vincent.
