= Roe (1797 ship) =

History

France
- Launched: 1787
- Captured: c.1797

Great Britain
- Name: Roe
- Acquired: 1797 by purchase of a prize
- Captured: 1798

General characteristics
- Tons burthen: 210, or 241 (bm)
- Complement: 15
- Armament: 1797:2 × 9-pounder + 4 × 6-pounder guns; 1797:10 × 6-pounder guns

Roe was launched in France in 1787, almost certainly under another name. She was taken in prize and became a Liverpool-based slave ship in the triangular trade of enslaved people. The French captured her in 1798, as she was on her way home after she had delivered captives to Demerara.

== Career ==
Roe first appeared in Lloyd's Register (LR), in 1797, with Carlisle, master, John Shaw, owner, and trade Liverpool–Africa.

Captain Ledwick (or Ludwick) Carlisle acquired a letter of marque on 24 April 1797. He sailed from Liverpool on 11 May 1797, bound for West Africa to acquire captives. In 1797, 104 vessels sailed from British ports to acquire captives; 90 of these vessels sailed from Liverpool.

Roe stopped in Barbados and on 1 March 1798, arrived at Demerara where she landed 394 captives. She had left Liverpool with 30 crew members and she suffered two crew deaths on the voyage.

== Capture ==
Lloyd's List (LL) reported on 3 August 1798 that Roe, Carlisle, master, from Demerara to Liverpool, had been captured and taken into Guadeloupe.

In 1798, some 25 British vessels in the triangular trade were lost. At least two were lost on the homeward-bound leg of their voyage. During the period 1793 to 1807, war, rather than maritime hazards or resistance by the captives, was the greatest cause of vessel losses among British enslaving vessels.

In 1801, John Shaw would own a second slave ship named Roe that would make four voyages transporting enslaved people.
