= Saville (1777 ship) =

British privateer and merchant ship (1777–1785)

History

Great Britain
- Name: Saville
- Launched: 1777, Bristol
- Fate: Wrecked 26 August 1785

General characteristics
- Tons burthen: 180, or 200, or 250 (bm)
- Complement: Privateer: 100; Merchantman: 22
- Armament: 1778: 20 × 6-pounder guns; 1781: 2 × 6-pounder guns

Saville was launched in 1777 at Bristol as a West Indiaman. In 1778 to 1779 she sailed as a privateer and made two captures. She then returned to trading. She suffered two maritime incidents, one in 1784, and a second in August 1785, when she was lost at Port Maria, Jamaica.

== Career ==
The British Admiralty gave notice in April 1777, that they were ready to issue letters of marque for privateers against the Americans. In March 1778, Great Britain broke off relations with France. James Ranton, Saville's captain, acquired a letter of marque on 18 August 1777.

Saville first appeared in Lloyd's Register (LR) in 1778.

Year	Master	Owner	Trade	Source
1778	J.Ranton	J.F.Weare	Bristol–Antigua	LR

In November 1778, Saville, in company with Tartar, took a Swedish vessel that had been on her way from Venice to Bordeaux. They sent the prize into Kingroad. (Note: Seventeen seventy-eight was a poor year for privateering. Of the owners of the 14 Bristol privateers and seven letters-of-marque, all but one or two suffered disastrous losses in 1778 (prior to end-September).)

On her next cruise, early in 1779, Saville was in company with the Liverpool privateer Bess, which was under the command of Captain Perry. They captured Proteus, a snow from Philadelphia, and sent her into Milford. Proteus's cargo consisted of 281 hogsheads of flax seeds, 166 hogsheads of tobacco, 52 casks of pot-ashes, 15,000 staves, and 140 beaver skins.

In February 1780 Lloyd's List reported that Saville, Ranton, master, had been in company with St George, Matthews, master, and had been four days on their way to Nevis when they ran into a gale. St George had to put into Milford. She had five feet of water in her hold and 30 mules that she was carrying had drowned. Saville continued on her way.

Year	Master	Owner	Trade	Source
1781	J.Ranton; T.Nichols	J.F.Weare	Bristol–Antigua	LR
1784	T.Nichols	Davis & Co. Protheroe & Co.	Bristol–New York; Bristol–Jamaica	LR; repair 1784

In April 1784 Saville, Nichols, master, was returning to Bristol from Charleston when she grounded on the spit near Welch Hook, in the Bristol Channel. She was refloated on 15 April without damage and taken in to Bristol.

== Fate ==
In October 1785 Savile, Niccol, master, was reported lost at Port Maria, Jamaica. She was among a number of vessels lost in a hurricane there on 26 August 1785.
