= Tartar (1787 ship) =

History

Great Britain
- Name: Tartar or Tartar Packet
- Owner: John St Barbe (St Barbe & Co.)
- Launched: 1787 or 1788
- Captured: 18 June 1796

General characteristics
- Tons burthen: 150, or 160, or 165, or 230 (bm)
- Complement: 12
- Armament: 6 × 2-pounder guns

Tartar (later Tartar Packet) was launched on the River Thames in 1787. Initially, she traded between London and Smyrna. Between 1792 and 1794 she made one voyage to Bengal and back carrying dispatches for the British East India Company (EIC). On her return she became a packet for the Post Office Packet Service, sailing from Falmouth, Cornwall. In June 1796 she was bringing mail from New York back to Falmouth when a French privateer captured her.

== Career ==
Tartar first appeared in Lloyd's Register (LR) in 1787.

Year	Master	Owner	Trade	Source
1787	John Smith	St Barbe	London–Smyrna	LR
1789	J.Smith; W.Cartwright	St Barbe & Co.	London–Smyrna	LR

The information in LR suggests that on her return from the Mediterranean St Barbe sold Tartar to new owners who may have intended to use her as a slave ship.

Year	Master	Owner	Trade	Source
1791	Cartwright; A.Cumming	St Barbe; G.M.Macauley	London–Straits; London–Africa	LR

However, although Lloyd's List's ship arrival and departure (SAD) data showed Captain Cummings at Gravesend awaiting to sail to Africa, there is no evidence that he ever did so. The data in LR was only as accurate as owners chose to keep it, and generally signaled intentions. Unfortunately, missing volumes of LR and missing pages in extant issues make it impossible to document any correction.

On 29 August 1792 the EIC's Court of Directors took up Tartar to sail as a packet to Bengal, and to remain there. She was to be ready by mid-September. (Note: Hackman assigns this voyage to Tartar.) She then appeared in an EIC list of packets.

Captain Timothy Goldsmith sailed Tartar from Portsmouth on 1 October for Bengal. She arrived there on 28 February 1793. She sailed from Bengal on 2 April, but a few days later struck a rock in the Bengal River and had to put back. She sailed again on 17 May and was at St Helena from 4 to 12 September. On 18 September she was off Ascension Island. Tartar Packet sailed on to Cork and from there to Portsmouth, where she arrived on 30 December. She arrived at Gravesend on 17 January 1794. Tartar had sailed from Bengal before news of the outbreak of war with France had reached there. Still, Captain Timothy Goldsmith was issued a letter of marque on 29 August 1793, i.e., before he had even arrived at St Helena.

Year	Master	Owner	Trade	Source
1794	A.Cumming	Macaulay	London–Africa	LR

The first mention of Tartar Packet in Lloyd's Register (LR) occurred in 1794.

Year	Master	Owner	Trade	Source
1794	Goldsmith	St Barbe	Cork–London	LR

On 21 March 1794 Tartar Packet, Kerr, master, arrived at Falmouth from London. Then on 9 April Tartar Packet, Kerr, master, sailed from Falmouth to Corunna. For the next year plus she sailed back and forth between Falmouth and Corunna. On one voyage she brought back to Falmouth over £300,000 in remittances. On another, as she was sailing to Corunna a French ship of 18 guns chased her for six hours. She was almost taken, but escaped in the night. Command of the packet alternated between Captain Kerr (or Carr), and Captain Masden.

On 25 May 1796 Tartar Packet, Kerr, master, sailed for Halifax, Nova Scotia. He arrived there on 28 June and sailed for Falmouth on 6 July, arriving at Falmouth on 24 July.

On 3 November, Tartar Packet, Causer, master, (or Bullmore; sources differ), again sailed for Halifax. On 27 November She encountered a terrible storm that lasted 24 hours. Captain Causer stated that the storm was the worst that he had seen in his 25 years at sea. Tartar Packet arrived at Halifax on 9 December and left on 28 December. She arrived back at Falmouth on 13 January 1796.

== Fate ==
On 19 March 1796 Tartar Packet, Crosier, master, sailed from Falmouth, bound for New York. She was at Halifax between 24 April and early May, and arrived at New York on 14 May. She sailed from NY circa 15 June. On 18 June the French privateer Eagle, of 14 guns, captured her. Eagle also captured Georges, Forbes, master, which had been sailing from London to New Brunswick. Eagle took her prizes into Boston.

There were subsequent reports that the French were fitting out Tartar Packet to cruise as a privateer under the French flag.
