= HMS Tartar (1801) =

Narcissus-class frigate

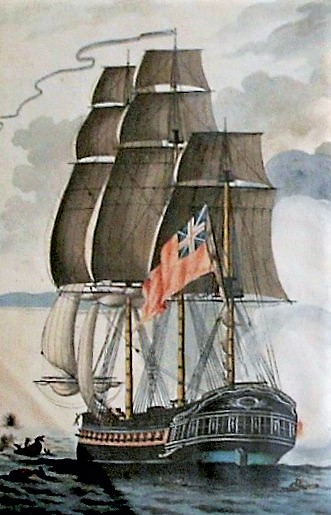
- Tartar

History

United Kingdom
- Name: Tartar
- Builder: Brindley, Frindsbury
- Launched: 27 June 1801
- Commissioned: July 1801
- Honours and awards: Naval General Service Medal with clasp "Anholt 27 March 1811"
- Fate: Beached 21 August 1811; Later burned

General characteristics
- Class & type: Narcissus-class fifth-rate frigate
- Tons burthen: 894 64/94 bm
- Length: 142 ft 0 in (43.3 m) (overall); 118 ft 3 1/2 in (36.1 m) (keel)
- Beam: 37 ft 8 1/2 in (11.5 m)
- Draught: 9 ft 9 in (3.0 m) (unladen); 13 ft 3 in (4.0 m) (laden)
- Depth of hold: 12 ft 6 in (3.8 m)
- Sail plan: Full-rigged ship
- Armament: 26 × 18-pounder guns; 6 × 9-pounder guns

HMS Tartar was a 32-gun fifth-rate Narcissus-class frigate of the Royal Navy, built at Frindsbury and launched in 1801. She captured privateers on the Jamaica station and fought in the Gunboat War and elsewhere in the Baltic Sea before being lost to grounding off Estonia in 1811.

== Jamaica station ==
Captain James Walker commissioned Tartar in July 1801. She sailed for Jamaica in October.

In June 1802 Captain Charles Inglis took command. On 30 August 1802 Tartar was among the British warships sharing in the capture of the French tartane Concezione.

In 1803 Captain John Perkins succeeded Inglis. Tartar was in Captain John Loring's squadron at the Blockade of Saint-Domingue when Vanguard captured the 74-gun Duquesne on 25 July off Saint-Domingue. Tartar outsailed her larger companions and kept Duquesne engaged until Bellerophon came up, at which point Duquesne surrendered.

As the British warships and their prize were sailing between the two islands of St. Domingo and Tortudo, near Port-au-Paix, they met up with the French schooner Oiseaux. She was armed with 16 guns and her crew of 60 men was under the command of Lieutenant de Vaisseau Druault. Loring ordered Vanguard and Tartar to escort Duquesne and Oiseau to Port Royal. (Note: The prize money for Duquesne allocated to a seaman on the British ships, including Tartar, was 2s 11d.)

Between 20 November and 4 December 1803 Tartar was in company with Captain Loring's squadron when the squadron captured the French frigates Clorinde, Surveillante, and Vertu, the brig Cerf, and the schooner Découverte. All five were taken into British service. Surveillante had on board at her surrender General Rochambeau the commander of the French forces on Saint-Domingue. (Note: The head money for an ordinary seaman arising out of the captures was 6s 6 d.) On 1 December the squadron detained the Hiram for a breach of the blockade of Cape Francois.

In 1803 and 1804 Perkins escorted Edward Corbet to Haiti. Corbet had been appointed to liaise with Jean-Jacques Dessalines, the new governor general and later first Emperor of Haiti. These missions were often less than successful.

In 1804 Tartar was on the Jamaica Station under Captain Keith Maxwell, who had received promotion to post-captain on 1 May. Around this time Tartar grounded in Murray's Roads, Bermuda. The tiny 4-gun schooner HMS Mackerel came to Tartar's assistance, temporarily salvaging the main deck guns and bower anchor.

On 31 July Tartar sighted a schooner. Maxwell set off to prevent the schooner from entering the narrow and intricate channel between the island of Saona and San Domingo where it would be difficult for him to pursue. As Tartar got closer he saw that the schooner was using her sweeps to aid her. Her behaviour made Maxwell suspect that his quarry was a privateer so he pursued her until neither vessel could progress farther. At that point, Maxwell was unable to get Tartar into a position from which she could use her broadside. Instead, he sent in a cutting out party in three boats. As the boats set out, their quarry fired a gun, hoisted French colours, and then opened fire on the boats. The schooner was not able to deter the attack and the British captured her with no more casualties than two men wounded. The French lost nine killed and six wounded, as well as three missing, presumed drowned when they tried to swim to shore. Maxwell sent the wounded to San Domingo under flag of truce, but kept the other Frenchmen prisoners, there being no English prisoners available for exchange. The privateer was Hirondelle, under the command of Captain La Place. She was armed with ten 4-pounder guns and had been out of San Domingo for two days. She had been active during the French Revolutionary Wars and for the past two years also, having frequently escaped pursuit due to her speed.

At the end of 1804, Captain Edward Hawker joined Tartar from Theseus and sailed her from Jamaica to the Halifax station. On 9 January 1805 Tartar, in company with Surveillante, captured the Spanish ship Batidor.

In May 1805, Tartar dragged her anchors and drifted onto a reef, resulting in serious damage. As there were no dockyard facilities in Bermuda that could handle a large frigate, five shipwrights from Halifax volunteered to sail to Bermuda to try to refloat and repair the ship. They arrived on 7 June on board HMS Cambrian and began work on 9 June. The repairs took 6 weeks and Tartar sailed from Bermuda on 28 July in the company of HMS Indian. They arrived back in Halifax on 5 August 1805.

On 6 May 1806 Tartar captured the American brig Romulus. Then on 9 June Tartar and the 10-gun cutter Bacchus captured the Observateur, of 18 guns and 104 men, which was under the command of Captain Crozier. Observateur had sailed from Cayenne on 13 May with the brig-of-war Argus, with provisions for a four-month cruise but had not captured anything. The Royal Navy took her into service as HMS Observateur.

On 23 August Tartar captured the Charlestown packet. Later in the year Captain Hawker exchanged with Captain Stephen Poyntz of Melampus and Tartar returned to England under reduced masts as a consequence of damage she had sustained in a hurricane.

Tartar was paid off in October 1807. Then between October and April 1808 she underwent repairs, which cost £18,700.

== Gunboat War ==
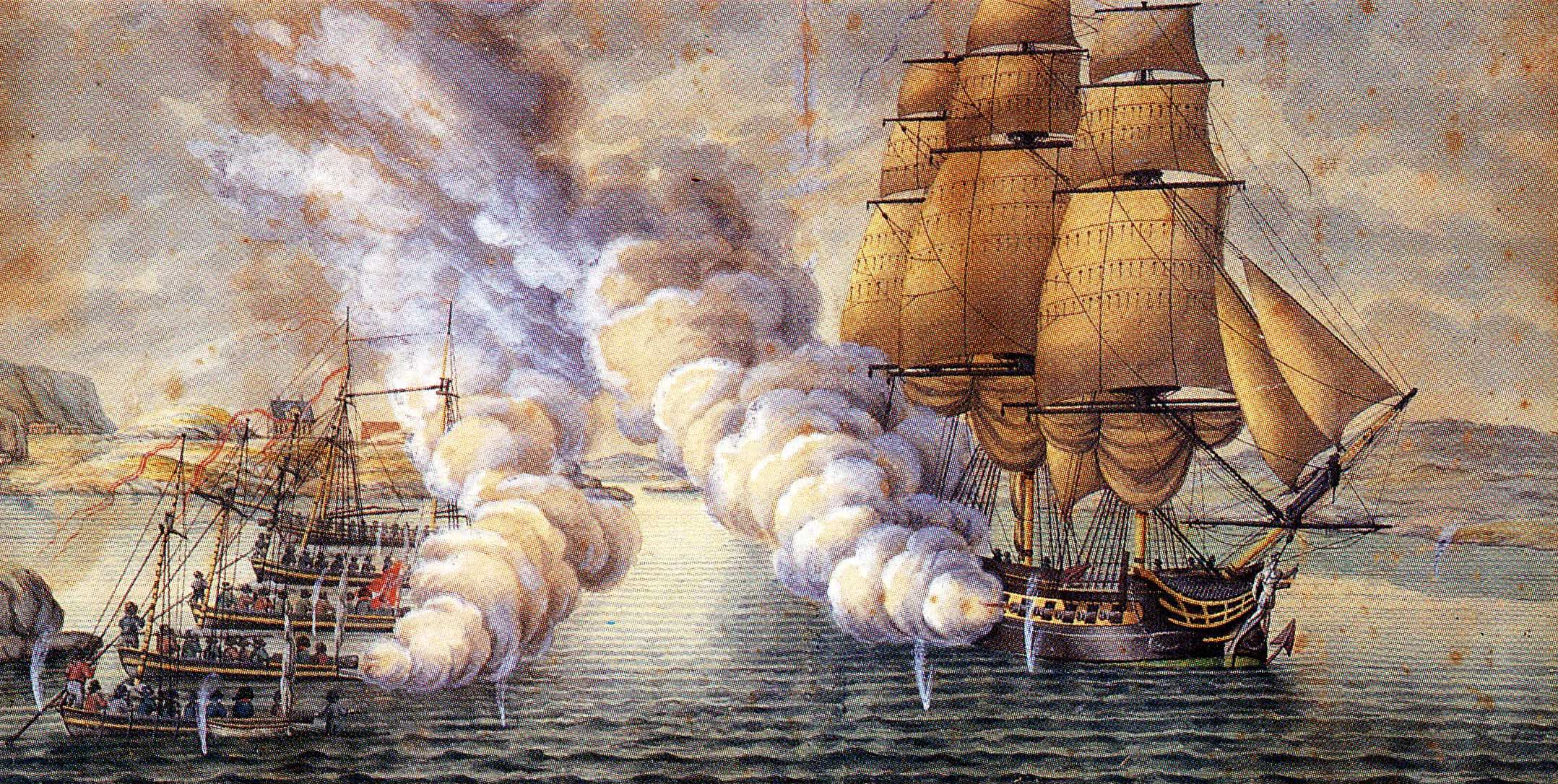
Tartar fighting gunboats at the battle of Alvøen

In October 1807, Captain George Bettesworth took command while Tartar was fitting out at Deptford for service in the Baltic. This was early in the Gunboat War between Britain and Denmark-Norway. In what became known as the Battle of Alvøen, Tartar sailed to attack the Dutch frigate Guelderland, of thirty-six 6 and 12-pounder guns, which had been reported to be in Bergen being repaired. Guederland had been escorting a small convoy to Batavia but then had to deviate to deal with a leak that she had developed.

Tartar left Leith roads on 10 May 1808 and arrived off Bergen on the 12th, but heavy fog prevented her from getting closer until three days later. Unfortunately, by the time Tartar arrived, Guelderland had sailed more than a week earlier. Bettesworth nevertheless decided to send his boats into the harbour to cut out some merchant vessels and three privateers that were there. When the boats encountered heavy fire and discovered that a heavy chain protected the ships in the harbour, they and Bettesworth returned to Tartar. However, as Tartar tried to withdraw, she came attack from the schooner Odin and between three and six gunboats (accounts differ). Cannon fire from the Norwegians killed Bettesworth and a midshipman, Henry FitzHugh, early in the action. A total of twelve lives were lost before Tartar was able to complete her withdrawal. The Norwegians lost four men, and a gunboat.

Captain Joseph Baker replaced Bettesworth in May. On 3 November Tartar was escorting a convoy off the Naze of Norway. She was 12 leagues (58 km) off Bovenbergen (Bovbjerg, Jutland) when she sighted a sloop that after a chase of three hours she captured. The sloop was the Danish privateer Naargske Gutten, of seven 6 and 4-pounder guns and 36 men. She was quite new and only one day out from Christiansand, without having made any captures. Six days later Tartar was in company with Constant when they captured Jonge Minert.

On 27 July 1808, Tartar was in company with Cygnet when Cygnet captured the Dutch privateer Christiana. Cygnet chased the privateer brig for nine hours before she could capture her. Christiana was a former British merchant brig now armed with twelve 12-pounder carronades and two long 9-pounder guns, and had a crew of 60 men. She had provisions for a one-month cruise and had sailed three days earlier from Christiana to intercept the homeward-bound Greenland-men off the north of Shetland.

Between 11 and 16 March 1809, Tartar, Ranger, and Rose captured sundry Danish vessels in the Baltic. On 13 March Tartar captured the Danish privateer Falcon, while Ranger and Rose shared by agreement. (Note: Baker received £3 14s 9d; an ordinary seaman received 11 1/4d.)

Three days later Tartar captured Kron Prince Frederick. She was carrying a cargo of spices that the British East India Company sold.

Tartar shared with Orion, Superb, and Cruizer in the capture on 8 April of Vergnugen and Gustaff. The next day the same four warships captured Caroline, and Tartar, apparently alone, captured St Johannes.

Then on 10 and 11 April, Tartar was in company with Orion, Superb and Cruizer when they captured the Danish sloop Brigetta and the Prussian galiot Erwartnung. At the end of the month, on 30 April, Tartar captured Charlotte, with Superb, Stately, Vanguard, Allart, Constant, Monkey, and Urgent being in sight. (Note: An ordinary seaman received 17s 9d; a lieutenant commanding received £16 1s 1 3/4d.) That same day Tartar, Superb and Constant captured Maria Dorothea. (Note: The prize money for an ordinary seaman was £1 12s 4d; Baker received £251 4s 1 1/2d.)

On 15 May 1809, Baker and Tartar chased a Danish privateer sloop near Felixberg on the coast of Courland. The sloop was armed with two 12-pounders on slides and two long 4-pounders, and carried a crew of 24. Her crew ran her ashore and then left her, taking their muskets up behind some sand hills where some local civilians joined them. Baker, concerned that the schooner might harm British trade, sent in his boats to bring her out or destroy her. The British cutting out party boarded the privateer, without loss despite the small arms fire from the beach, got her off the shore, and turned her guns on the beach. While the boarding party was securing the vessel, one of the men fortunately discovered a lighted candle set in a powder cartridge in the magazine and extinguished it when it had only a half an inch to burn. The privateer's magazine contained about a hundredweight of powder; had it exploded it would have killed the boarding party. (Note: Baker considered this artifice a "dishonourable Mode of Warfare".) The prize crew then brought the sloop off. The privateer was probably Felix. (Note: Baker received £43 7s 6d in prize money; an ordinary seaman received 8s 7d.)

On 28 October 1809 Cheerful captured Destrigheiden, Rinaldine, and a sloop, name unknown, while in the company of Tartar and Lynx. By agreement, Commander John Willoughby Marshall of Lynx and Baker of Tartar pooled their share of the prize money with that due Lieutenant Daniel Carpenter, the commander of Cheerful. (Note: As a result, each of the three received £29 5s 2 3/4d. Without the pooling Carpenter, because of his junior rank, would only have received £7 10s 5 3/4. An ordinary seaman received 10s 9 3/4d.)

On 13 April 1810 Tartar captured Crown Sloop No. 9. Then four days later Tartar and Nightingale were in sight when Mercurius captured Enighied.

Tartar and Raleigh were in company when they captured Twende Broders on 31 July. Tartar then captured Anna Maria Elizabeth and Enigheit on 6 and 7 August with Emanuel and Eliza Maria following on 11 and 10 August.

== Battle of Anholt ==
At the beginning of February 1811 Captain Maurice of the Royal Navy warned Vice Admiral Sir James Saumarez that the Danes were planning an attack on the island of Anholt, on which there was a small British garrison of which Maurice was the commander. Maurice received further confirmation of the attack on 8 March. Saumarez ordered Tartar and Sheldrake to sail to Anholt to provide support. They left Yarmouth on 20 March and anchored off the north end of the island on 26 March.

The next day the British garrison sighted the invasion force off the south side of the island. Maurice marched to meet them with a battery of howitzers and 200 infantry, but was not able to forestall a landing. He therefore pulled back to prepared positions and alerted Tartar and Sheldrake that the enemy was on shore. The two vessels immediately set sail, with Tartar going around one side of the island and Sheldrake the other. However, the shoals forced Tartar to swing wide, delaying her by many hours.

The Danes, who had eighteen heavy gunboats for support, had landed more than 1000 troops in the darkness and fog. They were poorly equipped and their attack was uncoordinated, with the result that the British batteries at Fort Yorke (the British base) and Massareenes stopped the assault. Gunfire from Tartar and Sheldrake forced the gunboats to move off westwards.

The gunboats made their escape over the reefs while the ships had to sail around the outside. Tartar chased three gunboats towards Læsø but found herself in shoal water as night approached and gave up the chase. On the way back Tartar captured two Danish transports that she had passed while chasing the gunboats; one of them had 22 soldiers on board, with a considerable quantity of ammunition, shells, and the like, while the other contained provisions. Sheldrake managed to capture two gunboats.

About half of the Danish invasion force managed to board fourteen gunboats on the western side of Anholt and make their escape that way. The Battle of Anholt cost the British only two killed and 30 wounded. The Danes lost their commander, three other officers, and 50 men killed. The British captured, besides the wounded, five captains, nine lieutenants, and 504 rank and file, as well as three pieces of artillery, 500 muskets, and 6,000 rounds of ammunition. In addition, Sheldrake's two captured gunboats resulted in another two lieutenants of the Danish Navy and 119 men falling prisoner.

The Danish troops came from the 2nd Battalion of Jutland Sharp Shooters, 4th Battalion 2d Regiment Jutland Jagers, and the 4th Battalion 1st Regiment Jutland Infantry. Maurice sent a flag of truce to Jutland offering to release the prisoners on their parole not to serve until exchanged. Baker proposed that if the Danish authorities agreed to these terms, that he would take all the prisoners to Randers to exchange for the officers and crew of the sloop Pandora which had wrecked off Jutland on 13 February 1811.

Because the Admiralty had declared the island of Anholt a vessel, "HMS Anholt", for administrative purposes, Tartar shared with her and Sheldrake in the head money for the battle and for gunboats No. 1 and No. 7, which Sheldrake had taken. HMS Anholt also had a schooner, the Anholt, as a tender. She had been cruising looking for enemy vessels but had returned in time to take part in the battle. All four vessels, i.e., including the island HMS Anholt, also shared in the money for the ordnance stores captured. In 1847 the Admiralty authorized the issuance of the Naval General Service Medal with clasp "Anholt 27 March 1811" to the remaining British survivors of the battle.

Tartar and Ethalion captured St. Helena (4 June), St. Johannes (5 June), St. Alexa (26 June), and the packet of Abo (4 July). On 17 June they captured Commerce. A month later, on 27 July 1811, Tartar and Ethalion were in sight when Fisgard captured St Ivan. In June and July the two warships also captured the Danish galiots Nos. 7 and 9, St. Peter, St. Simeon, and the sloop Expressen.

== Fate ==
Tartar grounded on 18 August 1811 on Dagö Island off the coast of Estonia and sprang a leak. Her crew was able to refloat her but she continued to fill with water. Baker then ran her ashore on 21 August at Kahar Islet, midway between Dagö Island and the Isle of Worms; he later burnt her to prevent her capture.

Ethalion rescued all her crew, who then were reassigned to other ships on the Baltic station. A court martial on 23 October honorably acquitted Captain Baker, his officers, and crew of Tartar's loss.

Curiously, there are prize money notices crediting Tartar and Ethalion with the capture on 11 September of Primus.

On 26th of July 1816, Constantin von Ungern-Sternberg, owner of the Suuremõisa estate, reported, that the Tartar shipwrecked in waters near Suuremõisa 5 years ago, the ship had burned down to the water line and the crew, who all survived, were hostile and brought many inconveniences, the remains of the ship were given to him as compensation by captain "Bäker", who had been the captain of the British squadron patrolling the area at the time. That winter the ice had damaged the wreck, which was underwater. Constantine decided to try to salvage the wreck with the help of his ship Wilhelmine Magdalene. For 6 weeks, 30 men worked to recover material from the wreck. Wood, some brass and an anchor were recovered from the wreck. He also adds, that the wreck, that is located 3 fathoms underwater, can be unquestionably considered his property.

In 2016, the wreck of the Tartar was rediscovered by underwater explorer Andrei Ossiptšuk. According to him, the port side of the ship is still preserved at a height of a few meters and the rudder blade of the ship is very well preserved.

== Post script ==
On the Sunday prior to 6 November, a Russian galiot that Tartar had captured was laying stranded at Montrose. The river had carried her and deposited her on the beach. A strong tide then lifted her, causing her to drift out to sea where she was dashed to pieces on the Ness (probably Scurdie Ness).
