= James Walker (Royal Navy officer) =

British Royal Navy officer (1764–1831)

Rear-Admiral James Walker CB
- Born: 1764
- Died: July 13, 1831 (aged 66–67); Blatchington, near Seaford, Sussex
- Relatives: Alexander Melville, 5th Earl of Leven (grandfather)
- Military career
- Allegiance: United Kingdom of Great Britain and Ireland
- Branch: Royal Navy
- Service years: 1776–1831
- Rank: Rear-Admiral
- Commands: HMS Gibraltar; HMS Terror; HMS Trusty; HMS Garland; HMS Monmouth; HMS Veteran; HMS Brakel; HMS Prince George; HMS Prince; HMS Isis; HMS Tartar; HMS Vanguard; HMS Duquesne; HMS Thalia; HMS Bedford; HMS Albion; HMS Queen; HMS Northumberland
- Conflicts: American Revolutionary War; Battle of the Chesapeake; Battle of St. Kitts; Battle of the Saintes; Action of 18 October 1782; French Revolutionary Wars; Glorious First of June; Battle of Camperdown; Battle of Copenhagen; Napoleonic Wars; Haitian Revolution; Transfer of the Portuguese Court to Brazil; War of 1812
- Awards: Companion of the Order of the Bath; Knight of the Order of the Tower and Sword

Rear-Admiral James Walker CB CvTE (1764 – 13 July 1831) was an officer of the Royal Navy. He served during the American War of Independence, and the French Revolutionary and Napoleonic Wars.

Walker spent his early years in the navy at first in British waters during the invasion scares of 1779, and then in North American waters where he saw action at most of the decisive naval battles of the war, particularly at the Chesapeake, St. Kitts and the Saintes. He reached the rank of lieutenant before the end of hostilities and spent the interwar years travelling on the continent. Returning to service with the outbreak of war with the French, he again participated in many of the key naval actions of the period, with his service at the Glorious First of June securing his promotion to his own commands. His career was almost ended with an accusation of disobeying orders, which led to his dismissal from the navy, but he was reinstated in time to develop a plan to subdue the mutinies at Spithead and the Nore. He commanded a ship at the Battle of Camperdown, and another at the Battle of Copenhagen, earning Nelson's praise for his actions.

The early part of the Napoleonic Wars were spent in the Caribbean, where Walker played an important role in the Haitian Revolution, and took the surrender of a French garrison. After time spent escorting convoys, Walker joined the ships covering the transfer of the Portuguese Court to Brazil, and struck up a friendship with the Prince Regent. His association with royalty continued with his services in transporting the Duke of Clarence, Tsar Alexander I of Russia and King Frederick William III of Prussia, and he was duly invested as a Companion of the Order of the Bath and a Knight of the Order of the Tower and Sword. His later years were spent managing a fleet off the American coast during the War of 1812, and he commanded several ships after the end of the wars, retiring with the rank of rear-admiral.

== Family and early life ==
James Walker was born in 1764, the son of James Walker of Innerdovat, Fife and his wife the novelist, Mary Leslie, the third daughter of Alexander Melville, 5th Earl of Leven. He entered the navy as a midshipman aboard the 32-gun HMS Southampton on 18 December 1776, serving under Captain William Garnier. He went out to Jamaica in January 1777, but returned to British waters for service in the North Sea and then the English Channel with Sir Charles Hardy's fleet during the invasion crisis in 1779. While serving in the Channel in 1780, Southampton captured an 18-gun French privateer off Portland, with 80 men aboard her. Walker was sent to assist in removing the prisoners, and after doing so remained on board to help with the baling and pumping, as the privateer was in danger of sinking. Despite his efforts the privateer suddenly sank, nearly taking Walker down with her. He was in the water for ten minutes before being rescued.

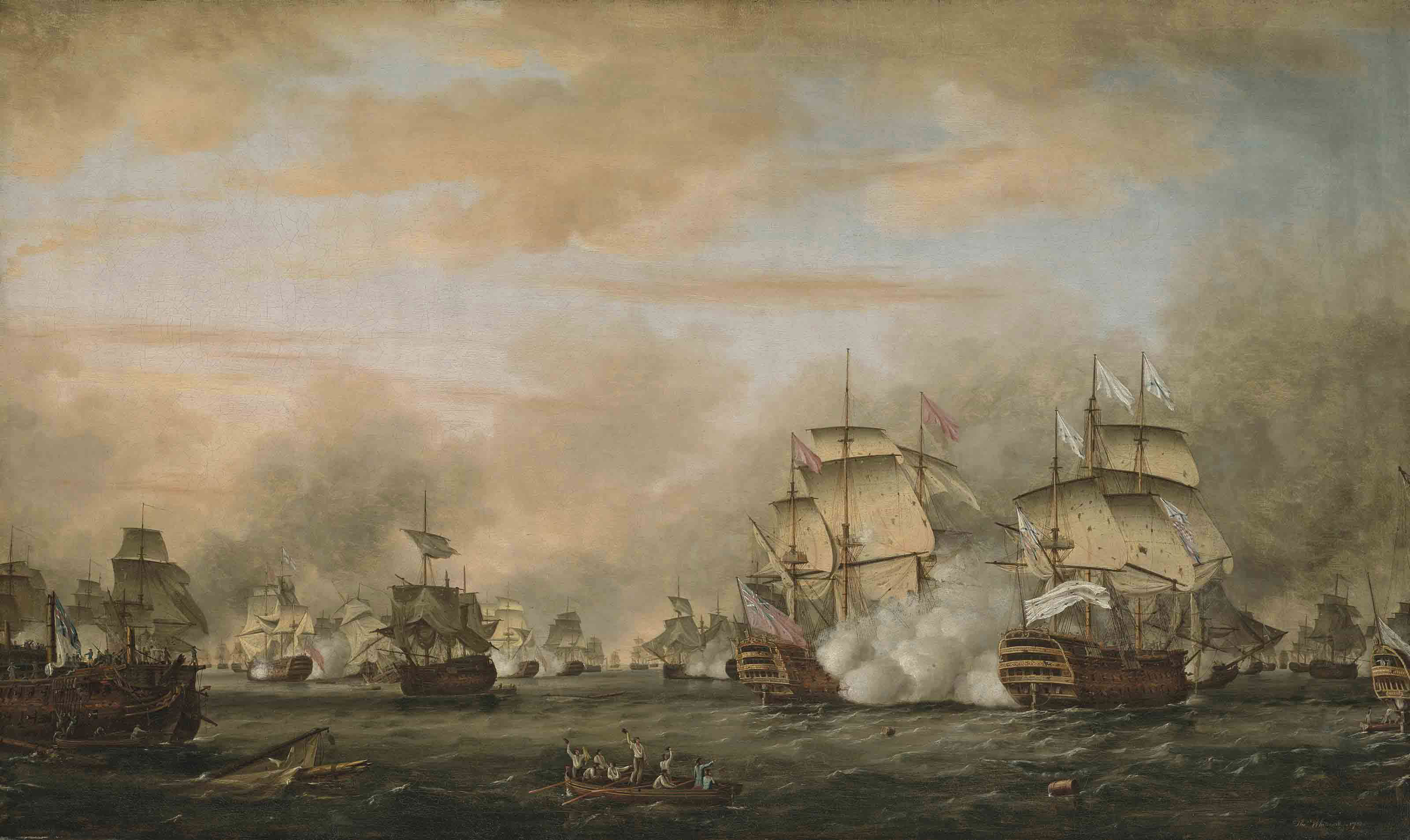
The Battle of the Saintes, 12 April 1782: surrender of the Ville de Paris by Thomas Whitcombe, painted 1783.

William Garnier was succeeded by Philip Affleck in command of Southampton in August, and the ship returned to Jamaica. Walker continued to serve on her until June 1781, when he was transferred to the 98-gun HMS Princess Royal, the flagship of Rear-Admiral Joshua Rowley.^{[a]} Walker was appointed to act as lieutenant on 18 June 1781 and was assigned to HMS Torbay, part of Sir Samuel Hood's squadron despatched to North America. Under Hood Walker saw action at the Battle of the Chesapeake on 5 September 1781, the Battle of St. Kitts on 26 July 1782, and the Battle of the Saintes on 12 April 1782. During the Battle of the Saintes Torbay had ten men killed and 25 wounded. Walker was then on the verge of being promoted again, due to the intimate friendship between his father and Admiral Sir George Rodney, but before this could be carried out Rodney was superseded by Admiral Hugh Pigot, and Walker remained at his previous rank. He continued on aboard Torbay, and was present at the action of 18 October 1782, when Torbay and HMS London encountered the French 74-gun Scipion. The British ships chased her into Samana Bay, Haiti, where she ran aground and was wrecked. Walker received his lieutenant's commission on 8 May 1783.^{[b]}

== Years of peace ==
After the end of the American War of Independence in 1783 Walker visited the continent, touring through France, Germany and Italy. While in Vienna in 1787, news reached him of political troubles with the Dutch, and he began to journey back to England in hope of a commission. While travelling through the forest near Aschaffenburg, the diligence he was in was attacked by ten armed men, who fired into the coach and demanded the passengers' money. Walker attempted to resist them, but was left unsupported by his fellow passengers, and was knocked down, robbed, and thrown into a ditch. The robbers took 800l of money and rode off, believing Walker to be dead. He came to, suffering from a sabre cut to the head, and was carried into Aschaffenburg. There his wounds were treated free of charge by the local surgeons and authorities, and on recovering sufficiently he was brought to Frankfurt. There the local lodge of freemasons offered him financial assistance, and on his arrival at Mainz he was presented to the Prince-Bishop, Friedrich Karl Joseph von Erthal. The Archbishop gave him a letter detailing his adventure in the forest near Aschaffenburg, and commending his bravery. Despite this assistance Walker was unable to reach England until after the Dutch crisis had abated, and so returned to his travels in Germany.

The outbreak of the Russo-Turkish War created a new opportunity for Walker, when in 1788 the Russians offered him command of a ship. The Admiralty refused to grant him permission to accept however, and Walker was obliged to turn it down. Despite this, Walker returned to service in the Royal Navy in 1789, with an appointment on 11 September to the 24-gun HMS Champion, based at Leith under Captain Sampson Edwards. He transferred to the 32-gun HMS Winchelsea on 24 January 1790, serving in the English Channel under Captain Richard Fisher. He left the ship in February 1792 and spent nearly a year at home. He was back on active service from 2 December with an appointment to the 98-gun HMS Boyne, intended as the flagship of Walker's old commander, now Rear-Admiral Philip Affleck. Boyne escorted a convoy of ships of the East India Company to the Tropic of Capricorn, and Walker remained with her until shortly after the outbreak of war with Revolutionary France. On 24 June 1793 he transferred to the 32-gun HMS Niger, which was then under Captain the Honourable Arthur Kaye Legge, as first-lieutenant.

== French Revolutionary Wars ==
=== Promotion and temporary commands ===
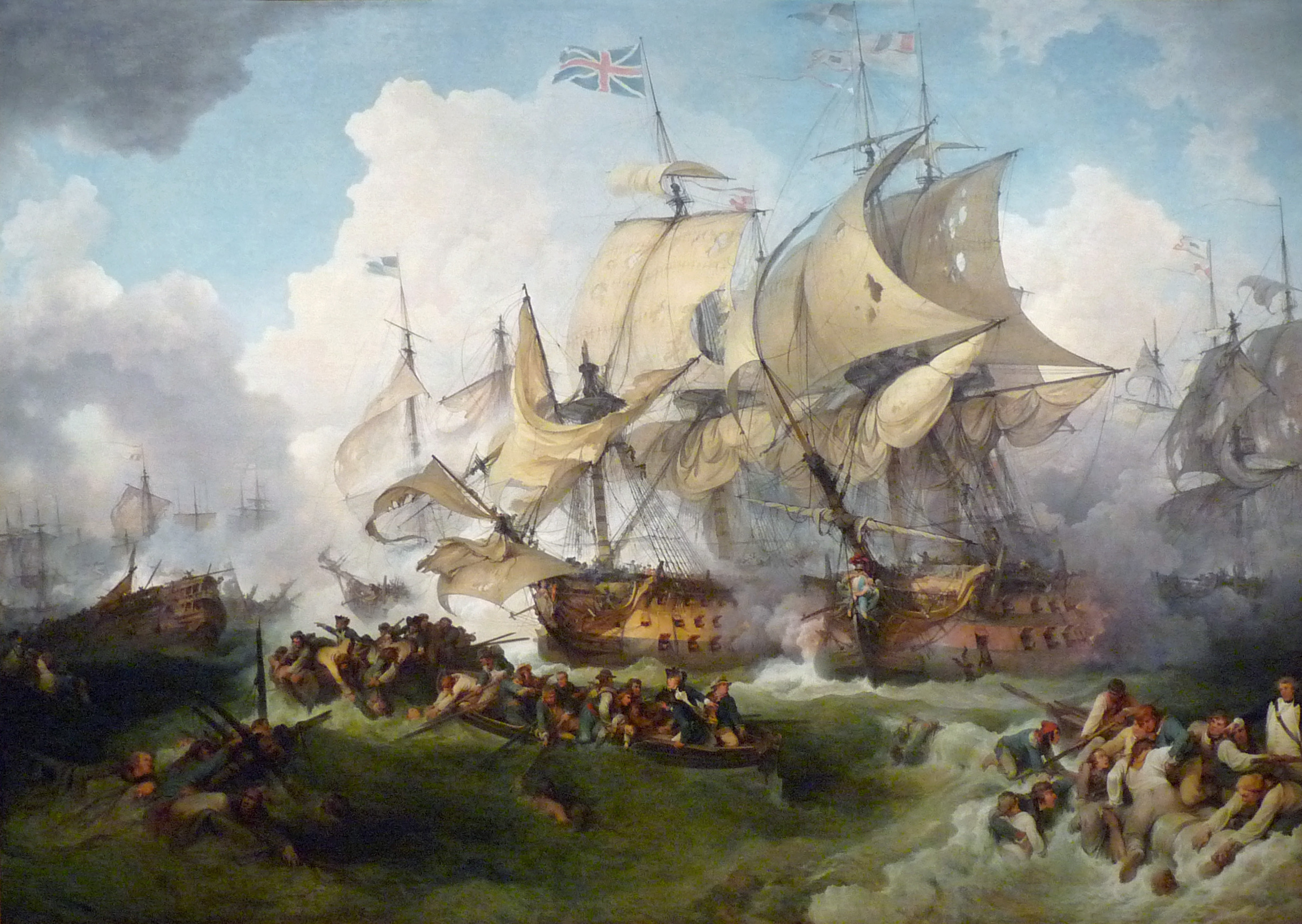
Lord Howe's action, or the Glorious First of June Philippe-Jacques de Loutherbourg, 1795.

Niger was attached to the Channel Fleet, and took part of the Atlantic campaign of May 1794 with Lord Howe. She was one of the repeating ships at the Glorious First of June, though she did not take part in the fighting herself. Walker's role as signal lieutenant secured him promotion to commander on 6 July 1794. He went as a volunteer with Legge to HMS Latona, had a stint as acting commander of HMS Gibraltar and in April 1795 he was in temporary command of the bomb vessel HMS Terror. He received an appointment on 15 July 1795 to the temporary command of the 50-gun HMS Trusty, and was ordered to escort five East Indiamen to a safe latitude, and then to return to Spithead. Having escorted the merchants to the designated point he received news that a fleet of 36 English merchants were assembled at Cádiz, in need of an escort.

=== Dismissal and reinstatement ===
Disobeying his orders to return to Spithead, Walker made for Cádiz, gathered the convoy, and escorted them to Britain. It was a controversial action. The merchants claimed the cargoes were worth £1 million, and would have been at considerable risk from enemy vessels were it not for Walker's escort. However the Spanish authorities were greatly incensed, arresting five of Trusty's officers while she was at Cádiz on charges of having smuggled the merchant's money out of the port, and demanding Walker be court-martialled. Walker justified himself by pointing to the imminent alliance between France and Spain, but despite the Lords of the Admiralty being sympathetic to his cause, he was found guilty of disobeying orders, and was dismissed from the navy. The Lords advised him to join the fleet despatched to the West Indies under Sir Hugh Cloberry Christian, but it was dispersed by gales and the ship Walker was travelling on returned to port. There it was suggested that he wait in Britain, and with the Spanish declaration of war, Walker was reinstated on the navy list in March 1797 by an order in council.

=== Mutiny and Camperdown ===
Shortly afterwards mutiny broke out at Spithead and at the Nore. Walker proposed an attack on the mutinous ships at the Nore using heavily armed gunboats, fitted with carronades, and was commissioned by the Admiralty on 10 June to carry this out. Walker set out down the Thames but only got as far as Gravesend before news reached him that the mutineers had submitted and his operation was no longer necessary. He was appointed acting-captain of HMS Garland on 16 July 1797 and conveyed a Baltic-bound convoy of merchants as far as Elsinore.

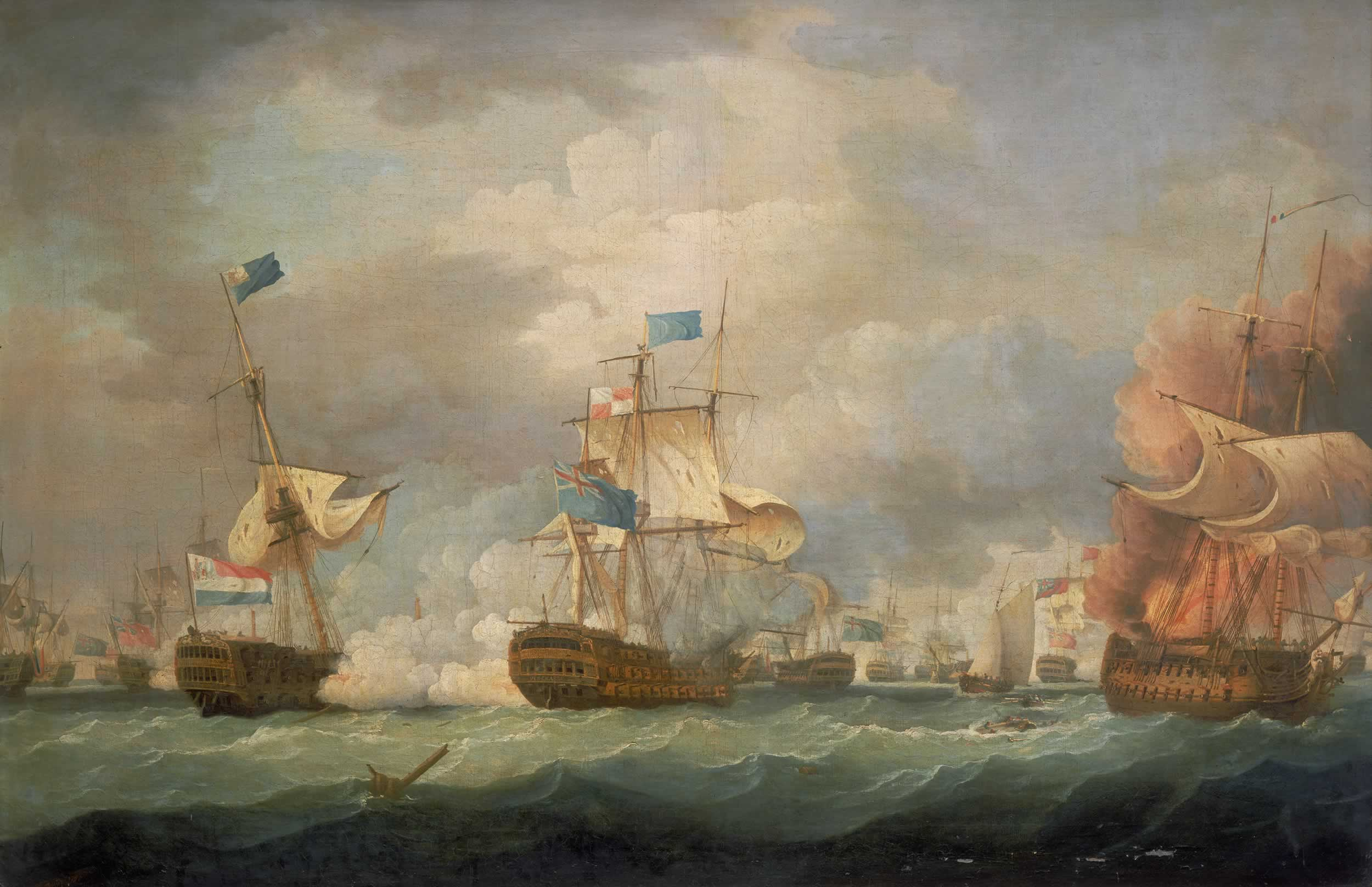
The Battle of Camperdown, 11 October 1797 by Thomas Whitcombe, painted 1798.

On his return he was appointed captain of the 64-gun HMS Monmouth on 20 August, still in an acting capacity. Monmouth had been one of the most mutinous ships of the whole fleet, and was heavily involved in the Nore mutiny. Walker took her to join Admiral Adam Duncan's fleet in the North Sea. Within a short time he was able to restore good order aboard her, and was able to play a significant role in the Battle of Camperdown on 11 October. As she approached the Dutch fleet Walker gathered the crew and addressed them saying 'My lads, you see your enemy; I shall lay you close aboard and give you an opportunity of washing the stain off your characters in the blood of your foes. Now, go to your quarters and do your duty.' During the battle Monmouth engaged the Dutch ships Delft and Alkmaar for an hour and a half, forcing both of them to surrender. Monmouth, which had lost five men killed and 22 wounded, took Alkmaar in tow, and despite sailing through a strong gale, reached the shelter of Yarmouth roads five days later. The battle was a decisive victory for the British over the Dutch, and Walker was among those captains rewarded, having his post rank confirmed on 17 October, and receiving the Naval Gold Medal and the thanks of parliament. He attended the service of thanksgiving at St Paul's Cathedral on 19 December, and assisted in depositing the captured enemy colours.

=== Later commands and Copenhagen ===
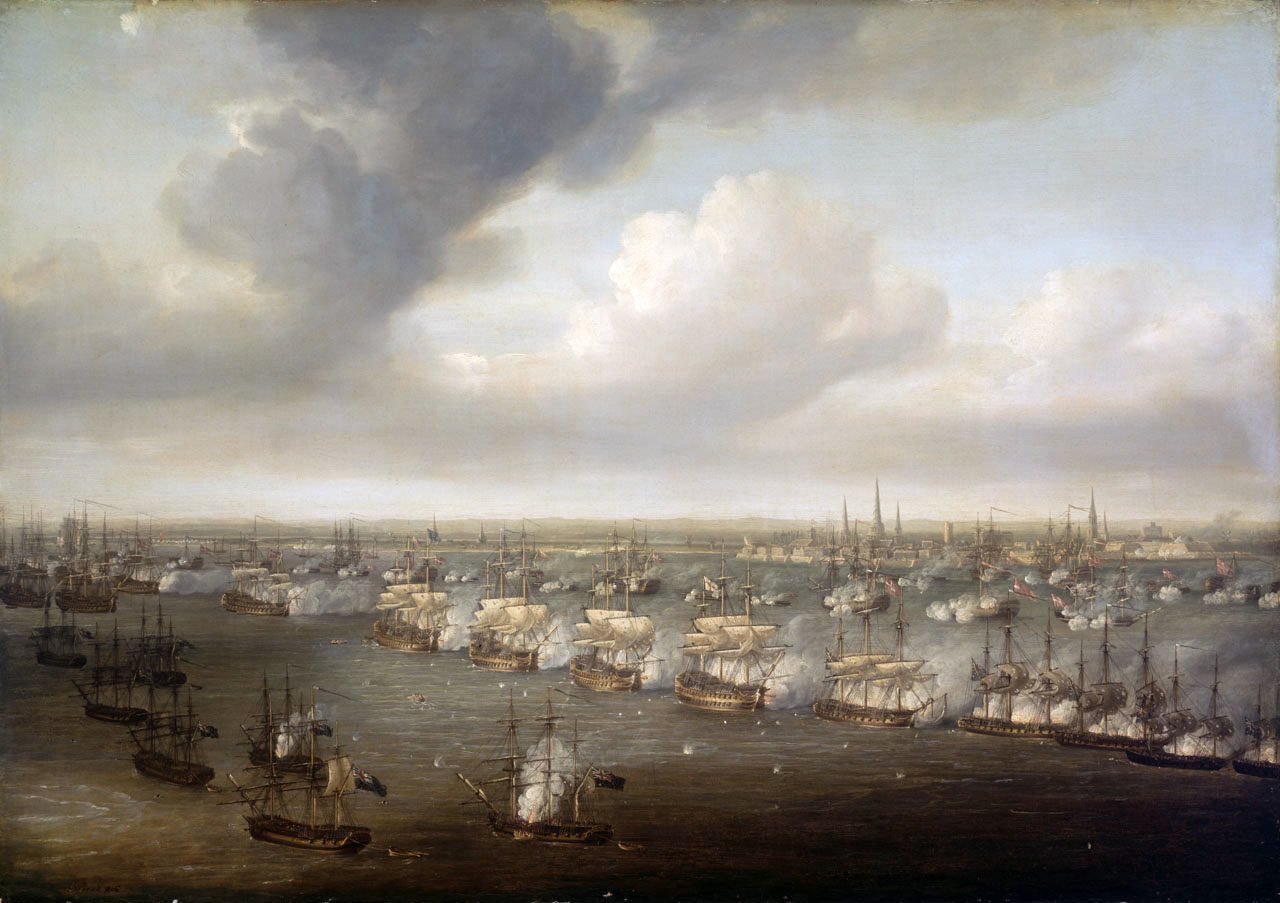
The Battle of Copenhagen, by Nicholas Pocock

Walker took command of the 64-gun HMS Veteran on 8 February 1798, before transferring in quick succession to the 56-gun HMS Brakel, the 98-gun HMS Prince George, the 90-gun HMS Prince and lastly the 50-gun HMS Isis on 7 October 1800. He commanded Isis in the North Sea, the Skagerrak and in the Baltic Sea, as well as with the Channel Fleet. Isis was assigned to the Baltic expedition under Admiral Sir Hyde Parker, and joined Rear-Admiral Horatio Nelson's squadron for the Battle of Copenhagen on 2 April 1801. The plan of attack had to be improvised at the last minute, after several ships ran aground while trying to enter the harbour, including Nelson's flagship, HMS Elephant. Walker took Isis in to engage both his own target as well as Elephant's, and ended up fighting two Danish blockships and a 14-gun battery. When eventually Nelson was able to work his way down the line he left Walker at his task and took another position. As he passed, Nelson took off his hat, waved it, and cried, 'Well done, brave Walker! Go on as you have begun; nothing can be better'. After four and a half hours of intense fighting Isis silenced her opponents, at the heavy cost of nine officers and 103 men killed or wounded. Nelson came aboard Isis the following morning and thanked Walker and his men for their brave efforts.

== Peace, and Napoleonic Wars ==
=== Caribbean and Haiti ===
Walker received an appointment to command the new 32-gun HMS Tartar on 1 July 1801 and took a convoy of merchants to Jamaica. He continued to be employed, despite the drawdown of the navy following the Peace of Amiens, and received command of the 74-gun HMS Vanguard on 27 January 1802. With the resumption of hostilities in 1803 he was assigned to the Blockade of Saint-Domingue, and captured the 44-gun French frigate Créole, bound for Port au Prince with 530 troops under General Morgan. On 25 July he captured the French 74-gun Duquesne. After taking his prize to Jamaica Walker returned to his station and on 1 October demanded the surrender of the French garrison at Saint-Marc. The garrison of 1100 men was besieged by the forces of generals Jean-Jacques Dessalines and Henri Christophe, and were short of food. They agreed to surrender to Walker and were taken off in order to save them from the vengeance of the besieging forces. In doing so he saved their lives, but as his provisions were rapidly exhausted he was forced to return to port to resupply at the point at which Cape François was about to fall, and so missed out on a considerable sum of prize money.

=== Convoys ===
Walker was then given command of his prize, the Duquesne, on 2 March 1804, and sailed her from Jamaica to Chatham with only 160 men. Also embarked on the Duquesne were an almost equal number of French prisoners, which had to be closely watched during the passage, in case they made an attempt to take the ship. Duquesne arrived in England without incident, and Walker paid her off for repairs. He then received command of the 36-gun HMS Thalia on 1 March 1805 and escorted convoys to the East Indies and Quebec. The voyage to the East Indies was made with two ships laden with treasure was made safely and quickly, with Walker arriving back at Spithead ten months to the day of his departure. The voyage to Quebec was made in company with two frigates, which delivered the convoy, but were delayed in port by gales until 1 December 1806. After setting sail Thalia became caught in a gale off the Newfoundland Banks and ran for 1250 miles for five days under bare poles. After returning to Spithead Walker was assigned to the Guernsey station under Sir Edmund Nagle, where he was given command of a squadron of three frigates and a brig to watch the enemy at St Malo.

=== Portuguese service ===
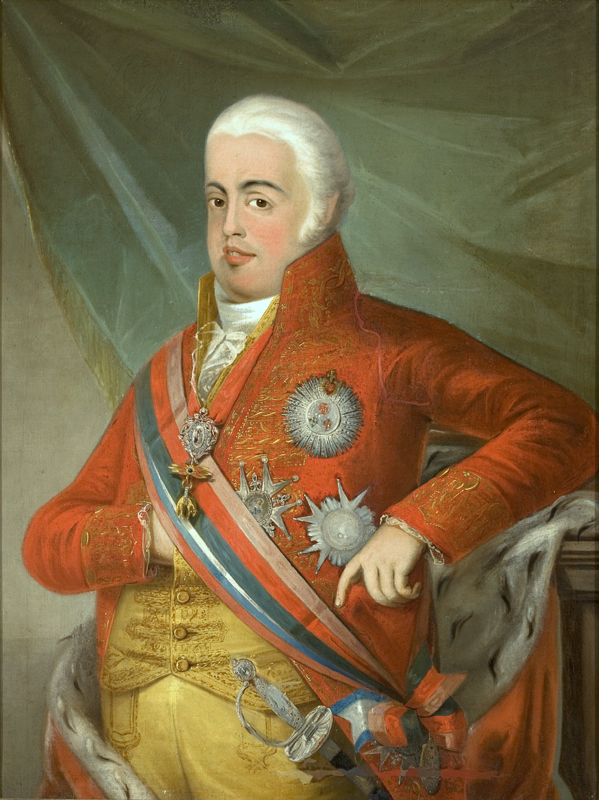
John VI of Portugal. Walker became a confidant during his time in Brazil while John was Prince Regent.

In October 1807 Walker was transferred to the 74-gun HMS Bedford and was sent to Lisbon with Sir Sidney Smith. While there the decision was made to evacuate the Portuguese royal family to Brazil, just prior to the capture of the Portuguese capital, Lisbon, by Napoleonic forces. HMS Bedford joined HMS Monarch, HMS London and HMS Marlborough as an escort for the Portuguese ships, with the British squadron being commanded by Commodore Graham Moore. The fleet was dispersed by heavy gales off Madeira, though Bedford was able to rejoin the ships carrying the royals two days later, and was the only British ship to escort them for the rest of the thirteen-week voyage. Walker struck up a friendship with the Prince Regent, who wanted to create him a member of the Order of Aviz, but owing to Walker's religion, he instead recreated the military Order of the Tower and Sword. The Prince Regent invested himself with the honour, and then immediately created Walker a Knight Commander of the order on 30 April 1816, making him the senior Knight Commander of the order. Walker spent two years with the court at Rio de Janeiro, and in addition to the honour, received the Prince Regent's portrait set in brilliants, a valuable diamond ring, and several letters testifying to Walker's good service.

=== Royalty, and the Americas ===
On Walker's return to Britain he asked for, and received, orders to join the fleet in the North Sea. Still in command of Bedford, he took part in the blockade of Flushing under Admiral John Ferrier, narrowly avoiding being wrecked in a gale on 14 January 1814. After being repaired she joined Admiral William Young, and then Admiral Scott to go into Flushing. In the summer of 1814 Walker was selected to accompany the Duke of Clarence on his journey to Boulogne to collect Tsar Alexander I of Russia and King Frederick William III of Prussia. Bedford then formed part of the fleet assembled for a Royal review. He then made two trips to bring army units back from the continent. In September 1814 he took command of a squadron carrying the advance guard of an invasion force to occupy New Orleans under Major-General John Keane. During the campaign the senior naval officers, Sir Alexander Cochrane and Rear-Admirals Pulteney Malcolm and Edward Codrington, went ashore, leaving Walker to manage the fleet, which owing to the shoal water, had to be kept a hundred miles offshore.

== Later years ==
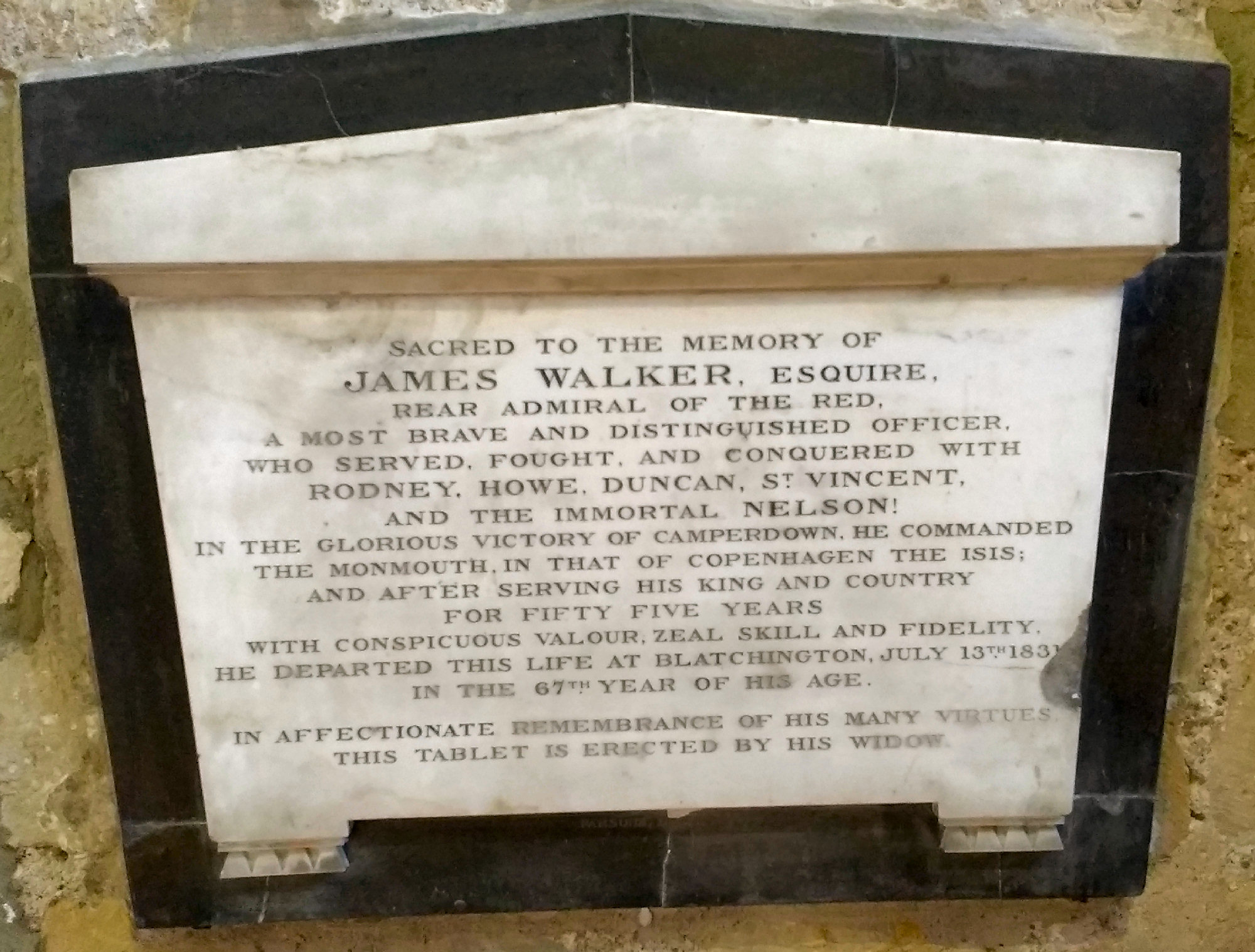
Memorial in St Leonard's Church, Seaford

Walker continued to receive employment despite the end of the wars with France and America, commanding in turn the 74-gun ships HMS Albion, HMS Queen and HMS Northumberland, paying off Northumberland on 10 September 1818. He was nominated a Companion of the Bath on 4 June 1815, and was promoted to rear-admiral on 19 July 1821. Walker was reportedly a cheerful and friendly officer, who won respect through his leniency and good nature. His commanding officer, William Young, once complimented him for keeping Bedford in a state of high discipline without once resorting to a flogging over a period of five months and three weeks. While in command of the Northumberland he was praised for his actions when he and his crew fought a fire that had broken out in Sheerness Dockyard, and which had threatened to destroy the entire yard. James Walker was twice married, at first to a daughter of General Sir John Irwin, Commander-in-Chief, Ireland. The marriage did not produce any children and after her death Walker married Priscilla Sarah, the fourth daughter of the MP Arnoldus Jones-Skelton. The couple had three sons; the eldest, Melville, entered the army, while the two younger sons, Leven Charles Frederick and Thomas, followed their father into the navy. Rear-Admiral James Walker died at Blatchington, near Seaford, Sussex on 13 July 1831 at the age of 67, after a short illness.

== Notes ==
a. The Oxford Dictionary of National Biography instead lists Princess Royal as the flagship of Sir Peter Parker. Tracey's Who's Who in Nelson's Navy lists Rowley. Winfield's British Warships of the Age of Sail 1714–1792 records that Princess Royal, under Captain Harry Harmood, had been Rear-Admiral Sir Hyde Parker's flagship at the Battle of Martinique on 17 April 1780, and subsequently at the Actions of 15 and 19 May 1780 against de Guichen's fleet. Harmood had however been replaced later in 1780 by Captain John Thomas Duckworth, and had become Rowley's flagship prior to sailing to Jamaica. She remained Rowley's flagship into 1781, when Duckworth was succeeded by Captain Charles Hotchkyns, and until her return home with a convoy and being paid off later in 1781.

b. According to the Oxford Dictionary of National Biography, Walker had received his promotion on 18 June 1781. This date is quoted in contemporary biographical sketches in the Annual Biography and Obituary, The United Service Journal, and Marshall's Royal Navy Biography. Tracey's Who's Who in Nelson's Navy however describes this as an acting-lieutenancy, and that Walker did not receive his commission until 8 May 1783.
