= Blockade of Saint-Domingue =

1803 naval campaign of the Haitian Revolution

- Part of the Haitian Revolution and Caribbean campaign of 1803–1810
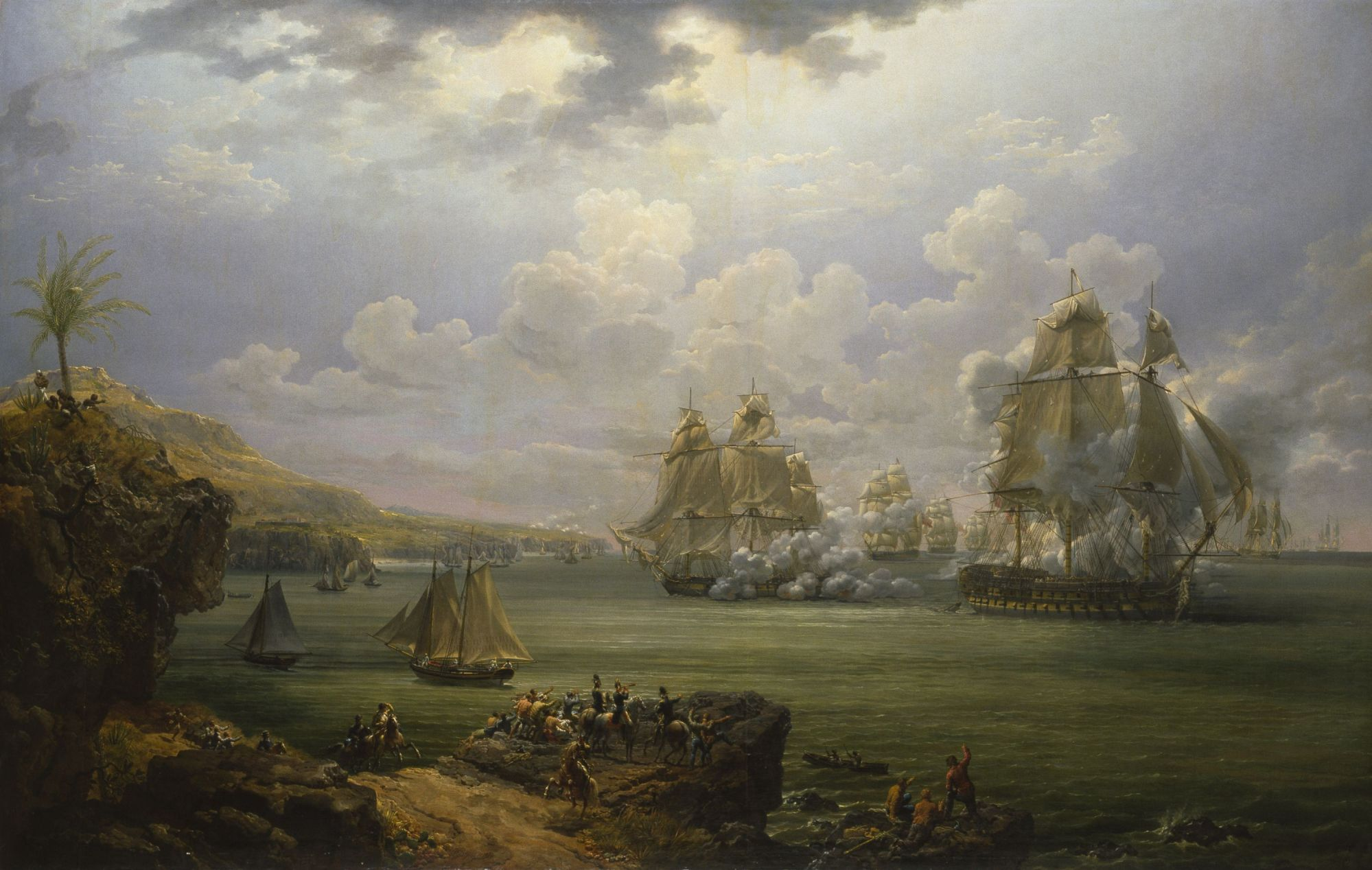
- The action of 28 June 1803, the opening engagement of the blockade
Date	18 June – 6 December 1803
Location	Saint-Domingue
Result	British victory

Belligerents
United Kingdom	France

Commanders and leaders
John Duckworth; John Loring	Rochambeau (surrendered); Louis de Noailles †; Latouche Tréville

Strength
7 ships of the line 5 frigates 2 brigs	7,000; 2 ships of the line 6 frigates 35 other ships

Casualties and losses
Unknown	6,000 captured 1 ship of the line captured 4 frigates captured 31 other ships captured
- 6 American merchantmen captured 2 Danish merchantmen captured

The blockade of Saint-Domingue was a naval campaign fought during the first months of the Napoleonic Wars in which a series of British Royal Navy squadrons blockaded the French-held ports of Cap-Français and Môle-Saint-Nicolas on the northern coast of the French colony of Saint-Domingue, soon to become Haiti, after the conclusion of the Haitian Revolution on 1 January 1804. In the summer of 1803, when war broke out between the United Kingdom and the French Consulate, Saint-Domingue had been almost completely overrun by the rebel Indigenous Army led by Jean-Jacques Dessalines. In the north of the country, the French forces were isolated in the two large ports of Cap-Français and Môle-Saint-Nicolas and a few smaller settlements, all supplied by a French naval force based primarily at Cap-Français.

At the outbreak of war on 18 May 1803, the Royal Navy immediately despatched a squadron under Sir John Duckworth from Jamaica to cruise in the region, seeking to eliminate communication between the French outposts and to capture or destroy the French warships based in the colony. On 28 June, the squadron encountered a French convoy from Les Cayes off Môle-Saint-Nicolas, capturing one ship although the other escaped. Two days later, an independently-sailing French frigate was chased down and captured in the same waters. On 24 July, another British squadron intercepted the main French squadron from Cap-Français, which was attempting to break past the blockade and reach France. The British, led by Commodore John Loring gave chase, but one French ship of the line and frigate escaped. Another ship of the line was trapped against the coast and captured after coming under fire from rebel shore batteries. The remainder of the squadron was forced to fight two more actions on their return to Europe but eventually reached the Spanish port of Corunna.

On 3 November, the frigate HMS Blanche captured a supply schooner near Cap-Français, and by the end of the month, the garrison was starving and agreed to terms with Dessalines that permitted it to evacuate safely if it left the port by 1 December. Loring, however, refused the French permission to sail. The French commander, General Donatien de Rochambeau, procrastinated until the last possible moment but eventually was forced to surrender to the British commander. One of Rochambeau's ships was almost wrecked while it left the harbour but was saved by a British lieutenant acting alone, who not only rescued the 900 people on board but also refloated the ship. At Môle-Saint-Nicolas, General Louis Marie de Noailles refused to surrender and instead sailed to Havana, Cuba in a fleet of small vessels on 3 December but was intercepted and mortally wounded by a Royal Navy frigate. The few remaining French-held towns in Saint-Domingue surrendered soon afterwards, and on 1 January 1804, the newly-independent nation of Haiti was established.

== Background ==
During the French Revolutionary Wars, the prosperous French colony of Saint-Domingue on the western half of the island of Hispaniola in the Caribbean Sea was the scene of heavy fighting. In addition to unsuccessful British and Spanish invasions, the colony was wracked by a brutal civil war as the Black population of newly emancipated slaves, under Toussaint Louverture, fought forces from the French Republic before allying themselves with the Republic against foreign powers. By 1801, Louverture had seized control of almost the entire island, including the neighbouring Spanish colony of Santo Domingo. He officially pledged allegiance to France, declaring himself the island's governor-general for life. However, following the 1802 Treaty of Amiens which brought an end to the French Revolutionary Wars, France's First Consul Napoleon sent a large expeditionary force to Saint-Domingue under General Charles Leclerc.

Leclerc's army had some initial success and Louverture was arrested after signing a peace treaty with the French general, later dying in unclear circumstances in a French prison. However, following Louverture's arrest and correctly fearing the French planned to strip free people of colour of their rights and restore slavery, Black general Jean Jacques Dessalines revolted against the French in October 1802. Leclerc and much of his army died in an epidemic of yellow fever by November 1802, and command fell to General Donatien de Rochambeau, whose forces were rapidly driven back into a few well fortified towns, relying for communication and supply on maritime links. In May 1803, the French situation in Saint-Domingue deteriorated further when Britain declared war on France after a peace lasting just fifteen months. In preparation for the coming conflict, the French had ordered a number of ships to sail from their southern ports in Saint-Domingue, the frigate Franchise sailing en flute from Port-au-Prince on 3 May. Franchise was however intercepted in the Bay of Biscay by a British squadron and captured on 28 May, as was the corvette Bacchante, which was captured on 25 June after setting sail in April. The remaining French naval forces in the colony were consolidated at the port of Cap-Français.

== The blockade ==
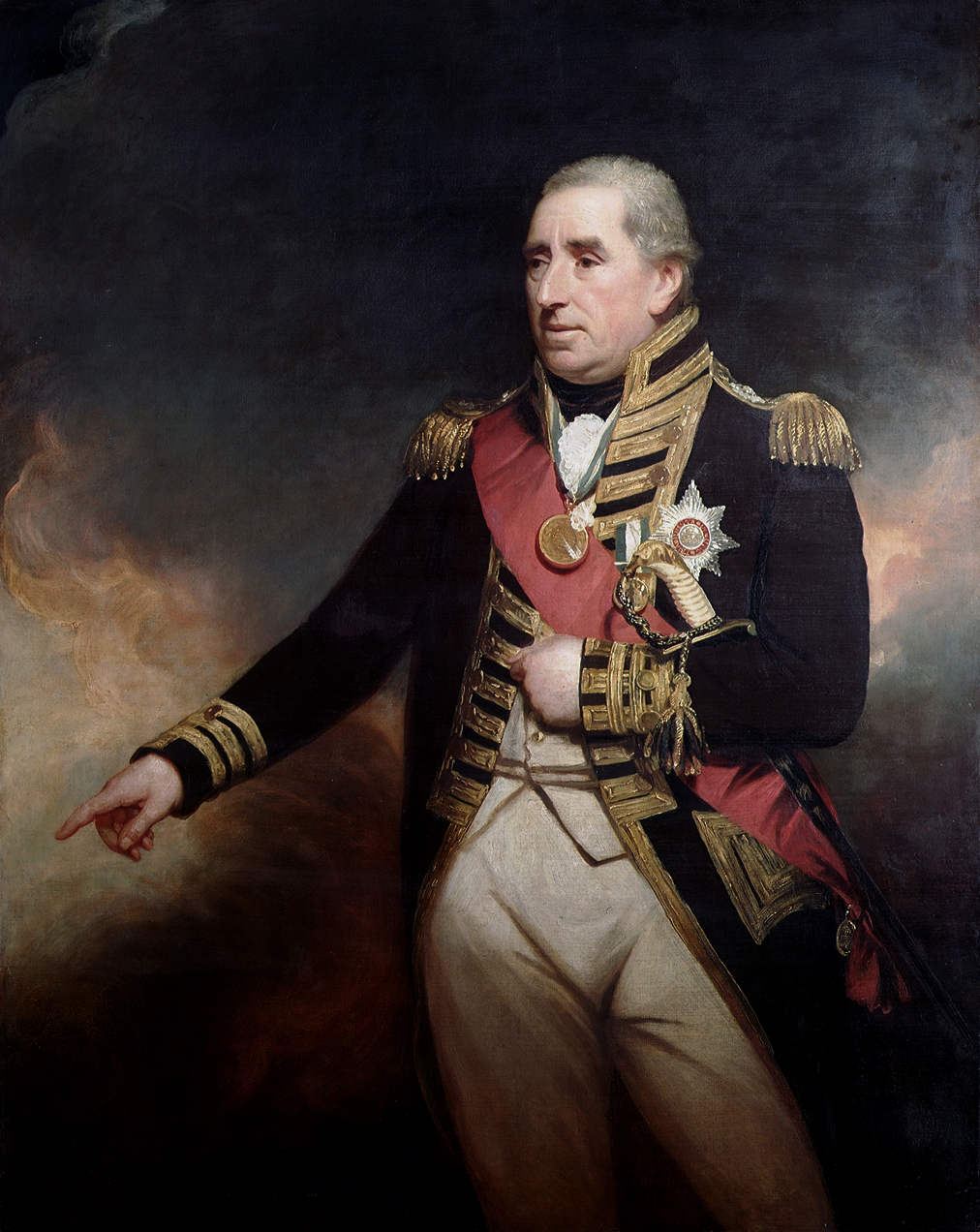
Rear-Admiral Sir John Duckworth, who commanded the blockade

The Royal Navy was well prepared for the renewed conflict, with a squadron of ships of the line and numerous frigates based at the Jamaica Station, their western Caribbean base, under Rear-Admiral John Duckworth. On 18 June 1803 two squadrons were sent to enact a blockade of the principal northern ports in French hands, Cap-Français to the east and Môle-Saint-Nicolas to the west. The first squadron, which cruised off Môle-Saint-Nicolas consisted of the 74-gun ships of the line HMS Cumberland under Captain Henry William Bayntun, HMS Goliath under Captain Charles Brisbane and HMS Hercule under the acting command of Lieutenant John B. Hills. The second squadron, assigned to the blockade of Cap-Français, was commanded by Commodore John Loring in HMS Bellerophon and included HMS Elephant under Captain George Dundas, HMS Theseus under Captain John Bligh and HMS Vanguard under Captain James Walker. Loring's force was accompanied by the frigates HMS Aeolus under Captain Andrew Fitzherbert Evans and HMS Tartar under Captain John Perkins.

=== Actions off Môle-Saint-Nicolas ===
On 28 June, the squadron off Môle-Saint-Nicolas sighted two sails close to the shoreline and closed to investigate. These were revealed to be the French heavy 44-gun frigate Poursuivante under Captain Jean-Baptiste Philibert Willaumez and the 16-gun corvette Mignonne under Captain Jean-Pierre Bargeau. The French ships had sailed with a reduced armament from Les Cayes in southern Saint-Domingue on 26 June with orders to visit Môle-Saint-Nicolas before returning to France. On identifying the ships as French, the British squadron separated under orders from Bayntun, the senior captain. Captain Brisbane was instructed to chase Mignonne, Goliath rapidly closing the gap between the ships as they exchanged a few distant shot without effect. Mignonne was becalmed close inshore, and when it became apparent that his ship would be caught by the far larger Goliath, Captain Bargeau surrendered without either side having suffered any damage or casualties. Mignonne was later commissioned into the Royal Navy as HMS Mignonne.

Bayntun had also ordered Lieutenant Hills to pursue Poursuivante, but Hercule suffered in the light winds, and Hills ordered Hercule's broadside to be fired much too early. This allowed Willaumez to pull much closer to Môle-Saint-Nicolas. When the much faster Hercule did find the wind, the ship of the line soon gained on the frigate and a sharp exchange of fire followed, in which both ships were damaged. Hercule was hit heavily in the sails and rigging, although casualties were limited to a few minor wounds, while Poursuivante was more severely damaged: the rigging, sails, masts and hull were all cut and battered with six men killed and 15 wounded. During the brief battle, Willaumez had manoeuvered his ship close to the shoreline, and Hills, his ship less manageable due to damage, suffered a devastating raking broadside that forced him to pull off in fear that Hercule might be grounded in shallow water. Working through the shallows, Willaumez managed to bring his frigate safely to Môle-Saint-Nicolas and then subsequently to Rochefort, although Poursuivante was soon afterwards decommissioned due to age and poor condition. Hills was forced to retire with his ship to Jamaica for repairs, his ship's place taken in Bayntun's squadron by Vanguard.

Two days after the engagement between Hercule and Poursuivante, Vanguard and Cumberland were cruising off the northern coast of Saint-Domingue to the east of Môle-Saint-Nicolas when another strange ship was sighted attempting to enter the nearby port of Jean-Rabel. This ship was the 40-gun French frigate Créole under Captain Jean-Marie-Pierre Lebastard, travelling to Jean-Rabel from Cap-Français with 530 troops under General Morgan. The ship was however in a poor state, the crew reduced to only 150 due to the yellow fever epidemic which had devastated the crews of the French ships in Saint-Domingue as well as the army ashore. Both Vanguard and Cumberland immediately gave chase to the frigate, which was unable to escape as a ship of the line rapidly overhauled Lebastard's vessel on either side. Walker fired a few shot from Vanguard at the frigate, and Lebastard fired a single shot in reply before striking his colours. Créole was subsequently conveyed to Port Royal in Jamaica for repairs and was there commissioned into the Royal Navy as HMS Creole under Captain Austin Bissell, but the ship was in a poor state, and foundered on the voyage to Britain, although the crew were saved by nearby British vessels. A French naval schooner was also captured by the squadron the same day, carrying a hundred bloodhounds from Cuba for use by the French military in Saint-Domingue against the rebel Indigenous Army.

=== Flight of Touffet ===
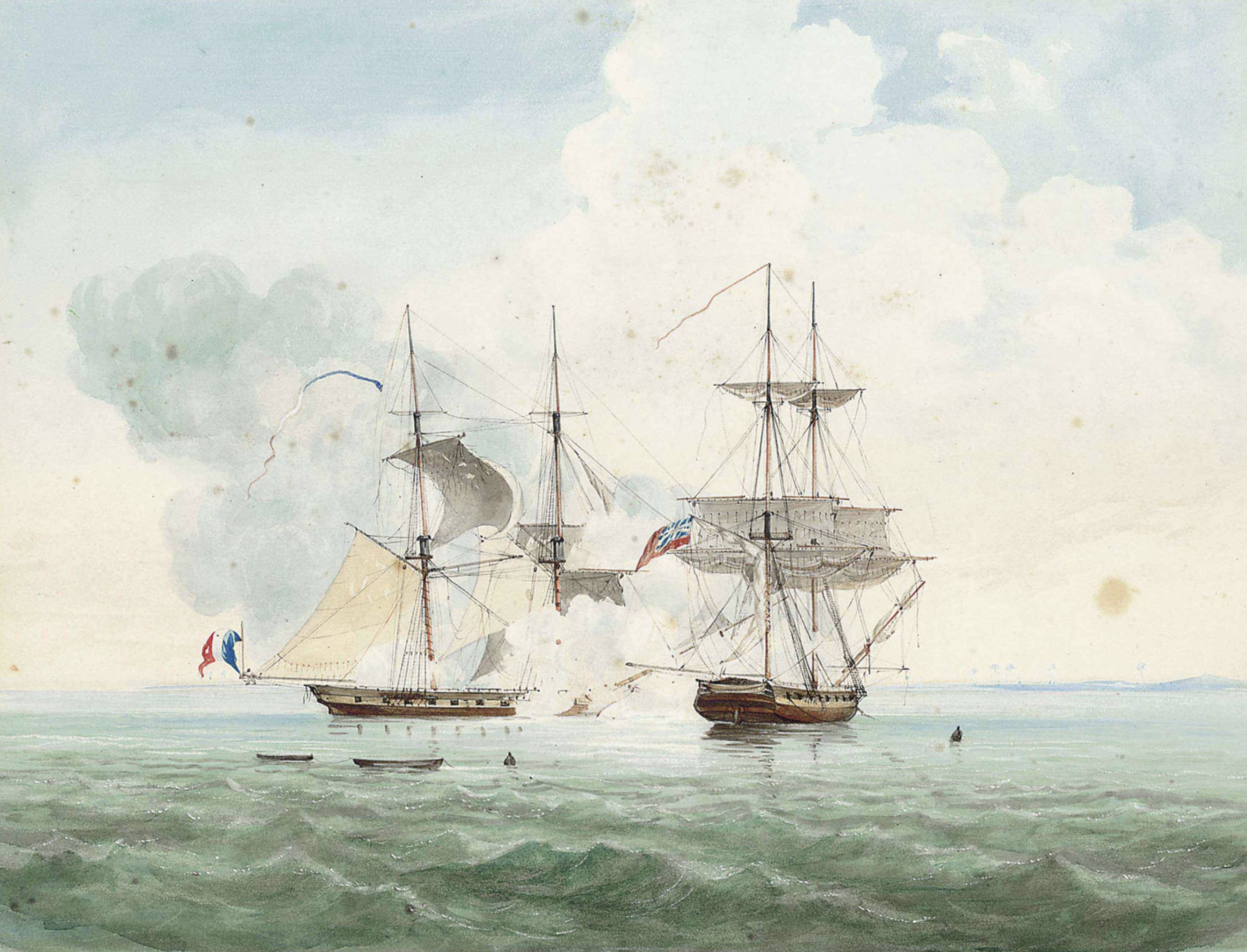
Capture of French brig Lodi by HMS Racoon on 11 July 1803 off Léogâne

In the month following the capture of Créole there was little further movement from the French naval forces on the island, the yellow fever raging in the harbours and Loring's blockade squadron at sea constraining operations. The only action of any note during this period was fought off Léogâne in the Gulf of Gonâve on the afternoon of 11 July when the 10-gun French brig Lodi was intercepted by the 18-gun British brig HMS Racoon under Austen Bissell, and forced to surrender after an action lasting 40 minutes in which the British ship had one man wounded and the French one killed and 14 wounded.

In late July the strategic situation altered when orders arrived from France demanding the return of the French squadron, primarily based at Cap-Français under Contre-amiral Latouche Tréville. Command of the returning squadron was given to Commodore Quérangal in the Duquesne, a 74-gun ship. Consolidating enough healthy sailors to crew three of his ships, Latouche Tréville gave orders for Duquesne, the 74-gun ship Duguay-Trouin under Captain Claude Touffet that following a recent accident only carried 54 guns, and the 40-gun frigate Guerrière under Captain Louis-Alex Beaudoin to sail from Cap-Français when it became possible. On the afternoon of 24 July, a rain squall drove the blockade force away from the post and Quérangal's ships slipped out of the harbour, initially sailing westwards with the prevailing wind. All were in a weakened state, none with full crews and all carrying large numbers of sick passengers aboard.

The French ships were sighted almost immediately by the frigates of Loring's blockade squadron, which began pursuit. At 21:00, Quérangal took advantage of the darkness to divide his ships, Duguay-Trouin tacking to the east while Duquesne continued following the shoreline to the west. In response, Loring ordered Dundas in Elephant to chase Duguay-Trouin while he remained in pursuit of Duquesne with Aeolus and Tartar. During the night both British pursuits gained significant ground on their targets, Loring joined by Theseus and Vanguard. At 07:00 on 15 July, Quérangal's ship was sighted by a rebel battery on shore and came under fire, Loring sending Theseus to investigate the gunfire and arriving on the scene himself soon afterwards, Tartar and Vanguard leading the squadron. Perkins was the first to come within range of the French ship, opening fire at 15:30, followed soon afterwards by Walker. Quérangal returned fire briefly, but his ship was too weak to face the British force, having only 275 crewmen aboard of whom only 215 were fit for duty. Duquesne was so poorly-manned that only 12 guns could be crewed at any one time, although one shot did strike Vanguard, killing one man and wounding another. Before the British ships could take up more effective firing positions however, Quérangal surrendered. His ship was taken into the Royal Navy as HMS Duquesne, but was broken up in 1804 following damage in an accident at Morant Cays.

The second pursuit, that of Dundas in Elephant and Touffet in Duguay-Trouin continued throughout the night, the British ship coming within range of the French at 06:00 on 25 July. Touffet opened fire on Elephant with his stern-mounted guns, striking the British ship several times, although without serious effect. Dundas was able, despite the French fire, to pull up at some distance from the French starboard quarter, firing broadsides although at such long range that they too had little effect. The action was decided soon afterwards by the arrival of two ships, the 18-gun British sloop HMS Snake under Commander William Roberts to the northwest and the absent Guerrière from the opposite direction. Dundas considered that the arrival of the frigate favoured the French too much, and dropped back allowing both ships to combine and escape. This was a serious miscalculation: historian William Laird Clowes notes that the French ships were both desperately under-armed and undermanned and even if they fought alongside one another they would have been unable to match Dundas's weight or rate of shot. By the time night fell, the French ships had reached open water in preparation for the journey across the Atlantic.

Touffet's voyage was however far from over: on 29 August while in the Eastern Atlantic close to the Bay of Biscay, they were spotted by the independently cruising 38-gun frigate HMS Boadicea under Captain John Maitland, which gave chase, the French ships turning southwards toward the friendly-neutral port of Ferrol in Spain. Throughout the following day, Boadicea followed the French squadron, losing them during the night of 30 August in a fog, but rediscovering them at 13:30 on 31 August when the wind shifted from the west to the northeast. Maitland could now see that Duguay-Trouin was a ship of the line, but was also aware that weakened ships were travelling to Europe from Saint-Domingue and consequently closed with Touffet's force, firing on his ship from a distance of 0.25 nautical miles (0.46 km) at 14:00, the French ship of the line returning fire. The fire from Duguay-Trouin was fierce enough that, in combination with the approaching Guerrière, Maitland considered that they were too powerful for Boadicea to effectively fight and he sheered away, briefly followed by the French ships. At 14:50 however, with Boadicea rapidly widening the gap between the forces, Touffet abandoned the chase, turning southwards towards Ferrol.

At Ferrol, a British battle squadron cruised off the port under the command of Commodore Sir Edward Pellew, HMS Culloden under Captain Barrington Dacres sailing at some distance from the remainder of the squadron. On 2 September, Touffet's small squadron appeared to windward sailing for the port of Corunna and Dacres was well situated to intercept them, opening fire at long range at 11:50. The French were faster than Culloden however, Duguay-Trouin successfully entering Corunna ahead of Guerrière as the Spanish batteries opened fire on the British ship. Although Dacres managed to damage Guerrière's masts and rigging severely, inflicting casualties of six killed and 15 wounded, the French frigate was able to enter Corunna ahead of Culloden. Dacres, who had brought his ship right into the entrance to the port was forced to retire, having suffered four men wounded.

=== Surrender of Cap-Français ===
With the removal of the ships of the line from the squadron at Saint-Domingue, the only remaining force of any significance was based at Cap-Français, consisting mainly of the frigates Surveillante, Clorinde and Vertu. In September, the southern port of Les Cayes surrendered, the garrison capitulating to the British brig HMS Pelican, while in the north Captain Bligh in Theseus bombarded Fort Labouque at the harbour of Fort Dauphin, an important anchorage for small craft resupplying the garrison of Cap-Français, on 8 September. The fort rapidly surrendered, as did a 20-gun corvette Sagesse, which was at anchor nearby but with only 75 men aboard. Fort Dauphin also capitulated later in the day, the French prisoners requesting that Bligh intercede with nearby rebels, which had captured a number of French soldiers including General Dumont and were intending to summarily execute them. Bligh successfully obtained the release of Dumont and transported all of the prisoners, including many suffering from yellow fever, to Cap-Français. While Loring remained off Northern Saint-Domingue, the brig Raccoon was active against ships travelling between Saint-Domingue and Cuba, destroying two small convoys in September and October.

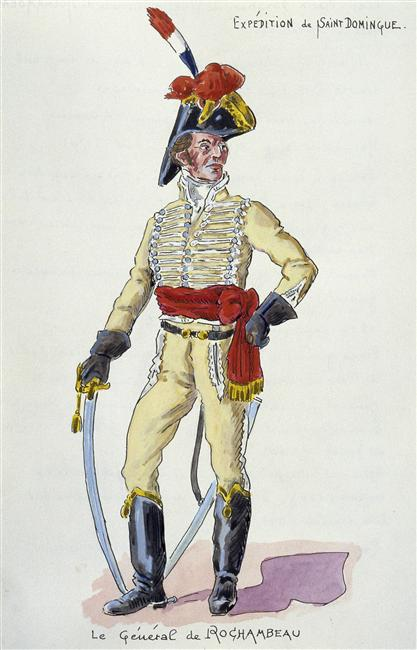
Illustration of Rochambeau in Saint-Domingue

In October, Latouche-Tréville obtained free passage from the British due to his poor health, and returned to France leaving Captain Jean-Baptiste Barré in command of the squadron. Attempts were still made however to supply the ports, which were under siege by rebel forces. On 3 November the frigate HMS Blanche under Captain Zachary Mudge discovered an armed cutter in Mancenille Bay carrying 52 bullocks to the garrison of Cap-Français and Mudge sent boats under Lieutenant Nicholls of the Royal Marines into the bay during the night. Nicholls, despite unhelpful interference from Lieutenant Warwick Lake of Blanche, successfully cut the ship out from under French shore batteries, losing two killed and two wounded to French losses of two killed and four wounded. In early November, Captain Walker in Vanguard took 850 French soldiers as prisoners of war from the port of Saint-Marc, General D'Henin surrendering his garrison after Dessalines's advancing forces had threatened to massacre them all. Captured in the harbour were the 12-gun corvette Papillon, naval schooner Courier and the transports Mary Sally and Le Trois Amis. On 16 November, Vanguard captured an American merchant schooner Independence attempting to enter Cap-Français.

On 17 November Rochambeau sent a message to Loring's squadron requesting that he be allowed to safely evacuate the port and return with his men to France. Loring refused, and so on 20 November the French general instead concluded a peace treaty with Dessalines, the terms of which insisted that the French garrison and population had to evacuate the port within ten days. Loring was informed of the terms of the agreement and although Rochambeau was ready to depart on 25 November, his ships crammed with thousands of refugees, the British squadron blocked all of the escape routes. On 30 November, as the rebels took possession of the vacated batteries and forts that protected the harbour, Rochambeau was still prevaricating, his ships lying at anchor directly under the guns of the forts. Orders were given to the rebel garrisons to make preparations to fire heated roundshot at the French in order to burn their ships to the waterline should the squadron still be in the harbour following the deadline. Concerned with the delay, Loring ordered Captain Bligh to enter the harbour and offer terms of surrender to Rochambeau.

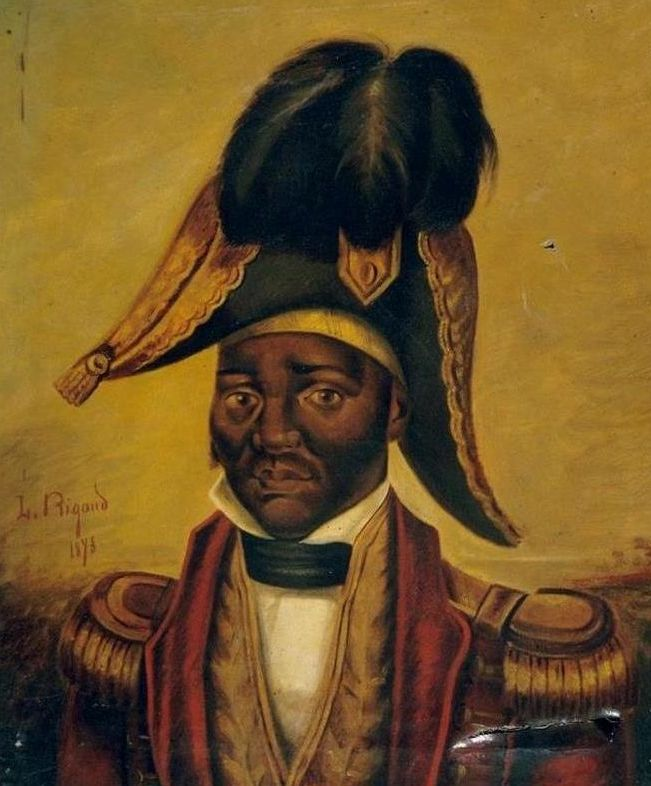
A painting of Jean Jacques Dessalines

After meeting Captain Barré, Bligh obtained a signed treaty establishing Rochambeau's total surrender to the British blockade squadron. Under the terms, the French ships would sail from the port flying the tricolour, fire a ceremonial broadside each, and then formally surrender to Loring's squadron. Having obtained French acquiescence, Bligh then had to carry the terms to a reluctant Dessalines, who ultimately agreed to permit the French to leave Cap-Français unmolested, although he refused to provide pilots to ensure safe passage out of the harbour. During the afternoon, Rochambeau sailed out first in Surveillante, firing his broadside and striking his colours to Loring. He was followed by a procession of ships, including Vertu, the 12-gun brig Cerf, the naval schooner Découverte, and the French merchant vessels Endymion, Casar, L'Augusta, Louis Cherie, Jason, Bonnevallere, Jeremie, Havre de Grace, Necessaire, Union, Nicholas Debarre, Marin, and an unnamed schooner, all of which were heavily laden with refugees and taken as prizes. The French hospital ships Nouvelle Sophie and Justice also surrendered, but were packed with hundreds of sick soldiers and sailors and were subsequently reprovisioned and sent back to France as cartels. Five American ships: Sisters, Eugene, Thesbald, Adventurer, and Hiram, and two Danish vessels, Diana and Bentley, were also filled with refugees and seized by Loring's force. Duckworth had arrived during the evacuation on Hercule, adding its boats to the numerous British craft assisting the overloaded French ships.

Disaster struck the operation however when the frigate Clorinde attempted to leave the harbour. Weighed down with 900 refugees and soldiers including General Jean François Cornu de La Poype and his staff, the ship accidentally grounded on rocks directly beneath Fort St. Joseph, now manned by rebel soldiers. Clorinde was stuck fast, heeled over and being repeatedly bashed against the rocks so that the ship's rudder had been torn away, leaving it helpless. The situation was deemed so hopeless that a number of British ship's boats that had been supervising the evacuation of the harbour turned away without offering assistance, abandoning the frigate as a total wreck. One of the rearmost boats however, the launch from Hercule containing 30–40 men and commanded by Acting-Lieutenant Nesbit Willoughby, turned towards the frigate. Willoughby was determined to assist the wrecked crew and passengers, well aware that without help they would either be drowned or killed by the rebels, who could be seen making preparations to fire heated shot from the fort at the frigate.

Aware that the people on Clorinde would swamp his boat if he drew alongside the frigate, possibly drowning all concerned, Willoughby instead commandeered a punt and used it to come aboard the frigate. Once on board, Willoughby persuaded La Poype to surrender the ship without the formalities observed outside the harbour, raising the Union Flag. The rebels were consequently unable to fire on a ship in possession of their ally, Willoughby going ashore to meet with Dessalines, who promised assistance. Willoughby returned with a number of boats crewed by the rebels and was joined by several British boats in anticipation of removing the crew and passengers from the stricken ship. On his return however, Willoughby discovered that the wind had fallen significantly, allowing him to use the boats instead to haul Clorinde off the rocks and into deeper water. Her hull was still intact, and by the evening Clorinde had joined the rest of the British squadron off the mouth of the harbour.

== Aftermath ==
With the surrender of the main French city in Northern Saint-Domingue, the conflict was almost at an end, with only Môle-Saint-Nicolas remaining in French hands. On 2 December, Loring's squadron reached the port and offered the same terms to General Louis Marie de Noailles as had been offered to Rochambeau, who refused, claiming he had stores to last a five-month siege and so Loring continued to Port Royal in Jamaica, his ships laden with prisoners, leaving Cumberland and the frigate HMS Pique to enforce the blockade.

That evening however, Noailles made a desperate attempt to escape the port with six small vessels. The French convoy was sighted during the night of 5–6 December, and soon overrun, the Republic, Temeraire, Belle Louise, Active and Sally Warner all seized by the British warships. Only one vessel, Noailles's flagship, escaped pursuit, although Noailles had apparently been mortally wounded as he died shortly after reaching Havana, Cuba as a result of his reported injuries. French histories recount that Noailles's vessel was able to board and overpower a small British warship en route, but no British warships of any size were lost in these waters during 1803 and so the origin of this story is unknown.

The fall of Môle-Saint-Nicolas marked the end of the conflict and the collapse of French rule in Saint-Domingue. Although French troops remained in the Captaincy General of Santo Domingo, they were too few in number to contest with Dessalines' forces, which now controlled the western half of the island. Historian Christer Petley argued Dessalines' role in the campaign led to him becoming arguably the most successful military commander in the struggle against Napoleonic France. On 1 January 1804, Dessailines proclaimed the foundation of the new black nation of Haiti, the first independent Caribbean nation since the pre-Columbian era as well as the first of Latin America in the Western Hemisphere and the second oldest independent nation after the United States.

== Notes ==
1. Note A: In 1827, historian William James named Claude Touffet as the captain of Duguay-Trouin, while William Laird Clowes, writing in 1900, named Jean-Marthe-Adrien L'Hermite. L'Hermite was not in the Caribbean during this period, and Touffet was likely the officer in command.
2. Note B: British historians William James and William Laird Clowes make no mention of any attack or injury to Noailles, but his entry in Encyclopædia Britannica states that he died in Havana in early 1804 as a direct result of a wound received from an engagement en route to the port with a British frigate. The only engagement reported was the one in which Pique captured the other five ships of Noailles's convoy.

== Bibliography ==
- Brenton, Edward Pelham (1837). The Naval History of Great Britain, Vol. III. London: C. Rice.
- Clowes, William Laird (1997) [1900]. "London". The Royal Navy, A History from the Earliest Times to 1900, Volume V. Chatham Publishing. ISBN 1-86176-014-0.
- James, William (2002) [1827]. The Naval History of Great Britain, Volume 3, 1800–1805. London: Conway Maritime Press. ISBN 0-85177-907-7.
- Sepinwall, Alyssa Goldstein, ed. (2012). Haitian History: New Perspectives Rewriting Histories. Routledge. ISBN 9781135766559.
- Woodman, Richard (2001). The Sea Warriors. Constable Publishers. ISBN 1-84119-183-3.
