= French schooner Découverte (1800) =

French Navy vessel

Découverte
History

France
- Name: Découverte
- Builder: Brest Dockyard
- Laid down: 1799
- Launched: 22 August 1800
- Captured: c. 23 November 1803

United Kingdom
- Name: HMS Decouverte
- Acquired: 1803 by capture
- Decommissioned: 1806
- Fate: Sold 1808

General characteristics
- Class & type: Découverte-class schooner
- Displacement: 110 tons (French)
- Tons burthen: 165 (bm)
- Length: 25 m (82 ft) (overall); 21 m (69 ft) (keel)
- Beam: 6.4 m (21 ft)
- Sail plan: Schooner
- Complement: French service:52 at capture; British service:
- Armament: French service: Originally: 8 × 4-pounder guns; At capture: 6 × 6-pounder guns + 6 brass swivel guns; British service: 8 × 12-pounder carronades

The French schooner Découverte was a French Navy vessel launched in 1800. The British captured her at Santo Domingo in 1803 and took her into service as HMS Decouverte. She was decommissioned in January 1806 and sold in 1808.

== French career ==
Between March and November 1800, Découverte was under the command of lieutenant de vaisseau Passart, carrying despatches between Brest and Ferrol. Still under Passart's command, she was at Ferrol between end-January and end-February 1802.

== Capture ==
Découverte was present at Saint Domingue (Haiti) in November 1803 during the revolt of slaves against the French, while the British blockade of Saint-Domingue trapped the French army and naval forces at Cap-François. The British observed a schooner in the Caracol Passage and Commodore John Loring, having received information that General Rochambeau, his staff and entourage might try to escape via her, decided to cut the schooner out. The boats of HMS Bellerophon and HMS Elephant went in during the night of 22 November and captured the schooner, which turned out to be the Decouvert, of six 6-pounder guns, six brass swivel guns, and a crew of 52 men under the command of ensign de vaisseau Froyant. The launches met with some resistance, but the British suffered no casualties; Découverte had two men wounded. Rochambeau surrendered on 30 November.

== British service ==
The Royal Navy commissioned HMS Decouverte in May 1804 at Jamaica under the command of Lieutenant E. Whyte. She spent the rest of her career on the Jamaica station.

== Fate ==
Decouverte was decommissioned in January 1806 and sold in 1808.
