= French frigate Surveillante (1802) =

French Virgine-class frigate

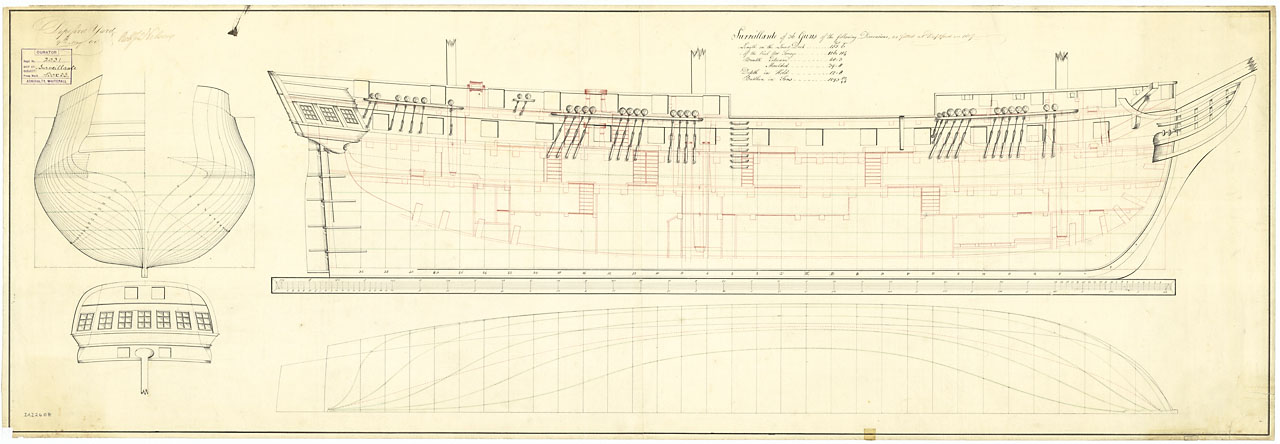
- Surveillante

History

France
- Name: Surveillante
- Builder: Les Frères Crucy (Basse-Indre)
- Laid down: July 1801
- Launched: 29 May 1802
- Acquired: December 1802
- Captured: 30 November 1803
- Fate: Surrendered to the Royal Navy

United Kingdom
- Name: Surveillante
- Acquired: 30 November 1803
- Decommissioned: 1814
- Fate: Broken up 14 August 1814

General characteristics
- Class & type: Virginie-class frigate
- Displacement: 1,390 tonneaux
- Tons burthen: 720 port tonneaux
- Length: 47.4 m (156 ft) (126-11.25 ft-ins)
- Beam: 11.9 m (39 ft)
- Draught: 5.5 m (18 ft)
- Propulsion: Sails
- Sail plan: Full-rigged ship
- Armament: 28 18-pounder upper deck cannon, 12 32-pounder quarterdeck carronades, 2 9-pounder bow chasers & 2 32-pounder forecastle carronades
- Armour: Timber

Surveillante entered service as a 40-gun Virginie-class frigate of the French Navy. She was surrendered to the British in 1803, after which she served in the Royal Navy, classed under the British system as a 38-gun vessel, until 1814 when she was decommissioned. HMS Surveillante had a long and active career under two successful and distinguished commanders, from the Baltic to the northwestern coasts of France, Spain and Portugal, and was present at the Battle of Copenhagen (1807) and throughout the Peninsula War. Her record as a taker of prizes is notable for its success, particularly towards the end of her career.

== 1803 – British capture ==
Surveillante was present at Saint Domingue (Haiti) in November 1803 during the revolt of slaves against the French, and was trapped by the British blockade of Saint-Domingue. The French naval commander who was also Surveillante's captain, Henry Barre, prevailed upon British Commodore John Loring's representative, Captain John Bligh, to accept the capitulation of Surveillante, in order to put her, as well as her crew and passengers, under British protection. The former slaves threatened to fire red hot shot at the ship from the overlooking forts.

The British naval Commander-in-Chief of the Jamaica station, Admiral Sir John Duckworth, accepted the French commander General Rochambeau, his staff and entourage, as prisoners. Duckworth wrote "From General Rochambeau's extraordinary conduct in the public service, neither Captain Bligh or myself have any thing to say to him further than complying with his wishes in allowing him to remain on board the Surveillante until her arrival at Jamaica." Another French frigate, Clorinde, suffered the loss of her rudder and was temporarily beached, although she was re-floated and taken as a prize. Consequently, both frigates were brought into the Royal Navy as HMS Surveillante and HMS Clorinde. Surveillante, newly built, was bought into the service quickly; the first recorded Navy Pay Office Ships' Pay Books from the Navy Board commenced from 11 July 1804.

== Prize-taking ==
- On 9 January 1805, Surveillante, Captain John Bligh commanding, in company with HMS Tartar, Edward Hawker commanding, captured the Spanish ship El Batidor.
- On 9 July, Surveillante in company with Fortunee and Echo captured several merchant vessels laden with sugar.
- On 7 December, Surveillante, accompanied by Morne Fortunee, Lieutenant John Rorie commanding, captured the merchant ship Cleopatra.
- On 5 July 1806, Surveillante, accompanied by the British vessels Fortunée, Echo, Superieure and Hercule, captured Spanish ship La Josepha, laden with quicksilver.

== 1807–1813: Captain Collier ==
=== 1807 ===
Captain George Collier took command of Surveillante on 22 April 1807 and took part in the Second Battle of Copenhagen that began late in August. She was present at the detention of numerous Danish merchant vessels that were taken as prizes, the proceeds of which were shared by the fleet. The Danish merchant ships shared by Surveillante were Hans and Jacob taken 17 August 1807; Die Twee Gebfoders, taken 21 August 1807; Sally taken 22 August; Speculation detained 23 August; Fama detained on 26 August; Aurora, Paulina and Ceres taken 30 and 31 August; and Odifiord and Benedicta, taken 4 and 12 September 1807. Admiral James Gambier sent Surveillante back to England entrusted with dispatches, explaining the outcome of the battle and the subsequent Danish surrender. Gambier signed his dispatch on 7 September on board flagship HMS Prince of Wales; Surveillante sailed directly from the Copenhagen Road to London, where Collier delivered the dispatch to the Admiralty Office in person on 16 September 1807.

Following Russia's declaration of war against Great Britain in 1807 following the Treaty of Tilsit between Napoleon and Alexander I of Russia, the British government issued an embargo against all Russian ships then found in British ports. Surveillante was one of 70 British vessels present at Portsmouth, at the detaining of the 44-gun frigate Speshnoy (Speshnyy) and Wilhelmina (Vilgemina), which were carrying the payroll for Vice-Admiral Dmitry Senyavin's squadron in the Mediterranean.

=== 1809 ===
Lieutenant General Arthur Wellesley, the future Duke of Wellington was appointed commander of the Portuguese expedition in March 1809, and received his letter of service on 2 April. He made his way to Portsmouth where he was received by the frigate assigned for his transportation, which was delayed from 3 to 14 April, nearly two weeks, waiting for a fair wind. That frigate was Surveillante. She was able to set sail on 14 April 1809 allowing Wellesley to embark upon his second voyage to Lisbon during the Peninsula War; however, Wellesley, troubled by bad weather, was subjected to a storm during his first night at sea; it was remarked that the frigate narrowly escaped shipwreck off the coast of the Isle of Wight. His aide-de-camp was sent by Captain Collier to request that Wellesley put his boots on and join him on deck, to which he replied he could swim better without his boots and would stay where he was.

On 30 October 1809 Surveillante captured French corvette Le Milan, in sight of HMS Seine. 3 December 1809 saw Surveillante driven southward from her allotted station off Rochelle, where she fell in with a French cutter privateer, La Comtesse Laure, which she captured. Collier wrote "The privateer is of a class and possesses qualities admirably calculated for the annoyance of the British Trade."

=== 1810 ===
On 23 June 1810 Surveillante captured the chasse marees Le Margaretta and L'Eclair, His Majesty's gun-brigs Constant and Piercer in company. On 5 September 1810, the Surveillante and the gun-brig HMS Constant, the latter commanded by Lieutenant John Stokes, were reconnoitering the Loire, when they observed a division of a French convoy running south from the Morbihan. The British ships gave chase and forced a single brig to seek shelter between two nearby batteries. Collier attacked the frigate with boats, whilst receiving fire from French troops ashore and succeeded in cutting out the brig without sustaining any casualties.

=== 1811 ===
On 30 April 1811 Surveillante captured the French privateer La Creole. On 20 July Surveillante was appointed to escort a convoy bound for Corunna.

=== 1812 ===
On 28 January 1812 Surveillante, in company with HMS Sybille, Captain C. Upton, and HMS Spitfire, captured the American ship Zone. On 25 May 1812, HMS Surveillante captured the American schooner Young Connecticut.

In late July 1812, Surveillante was part of a British squadron stationed off the north coast of Spain, commanded by Captain Sir Home Popham of the 74-gun Venerable. The British squadron, assisting Spanish Guerillas against the French, made an attack upon the town of Santander and the Castle of Ano. The castle was taken possession of by the Royal Marines, but the garrison of Santander was reinforced, and the Spanish and British attacking forces were obliged to fall back upon the Castle, sustaining losses as they retreated. Captain Lake of HMS Magnificent and Captain Sir George Collier, who commanded the British detachment, were wounded.

On 7 October 1812 Surveillante captured the American schooner Baltimore accompanied by His Majesty's Ships Venerable, Diadem, Briton,, Latona and Constant. On 20 December 1812 Surveillante recaptured the American brig Ocean bound to Lisbon from New York, laden with flour.

=== 1813 ===
On 4 February 1813 Surveillante was present at the capture of American schooner Rolla made by HMS Medusa, the Honourable D. Pleydell Bouverie commanding, and HMS Iris. On 23 March 1813 Surveillante took the fishing schooner Polly as a prize. On 15 April she was present at the capture of the American schooner Price, captured by HMS Iris, Hood Hanway Christian commanding. 27 April 1813 saw Surveillante involved in a notable action against American letter of marque Tom. Collier wrote, on 27 April, that she was captured "after a smart chase; she was from Charlestown, bound to Nantz; she is a remarkably fine vessel for her class, and, from her superior sailing, had already escaped eighteen of His Majesty's cruizers." Surveillante was accompanied by HMS Lyra.

On 5 May 1813 she recaptured the American ship Mount Hope, sailing from Charlestown bound for Cadiz, laden with rice, in company with HMS Andromeda and HMS Iris. On 1 June 1813, Surveillante captured the American schooner Orders in Council, a letter of marque (privateer), after a five-hour chase. Orders in Council was armed with two 18 and four 9-pounder guns. Surveillante shared the prize money from this action with two British privateers, the Rebecca and Earl Wellington, who were in sight of the action but did not take part in it, and with Iris, by agreement.

In late July 1813, Surveillante under Captain Collier was involved in landing operations off St. Sabastian's, in which they attempted to breach a battery. In so doing they established an artillery position whilst under heavy fire from the fortification. Several of her crew, and an artillery officer from the army, were killed. Surveillante remained in action against the French garrison on the island of Santa Clara, at the mouth of Saint Sebastian harbour. Collier announced that a successful attack had been made on 27–28 August, despite being under heavy fire.

In September Surveillante was present at the fall of San Sebastian. Collier wrote that the frigate's 24-pounders dragged over land and mounted on Santa Clara had silenced the enemy's guns opposing them in the Castle of La Motte. The French commander, General Rey, flew a flag of truce, capitulating to the British. "The garrison," wrote Collier, "still upwards of seventeen hundred, became prisoners of war, and are to be conveyed to England."

== Fate ==
Surveillante was broken up on 14 August 1814.
