= HMS Proselyte (1796) =

Frigate of the Royal Navy

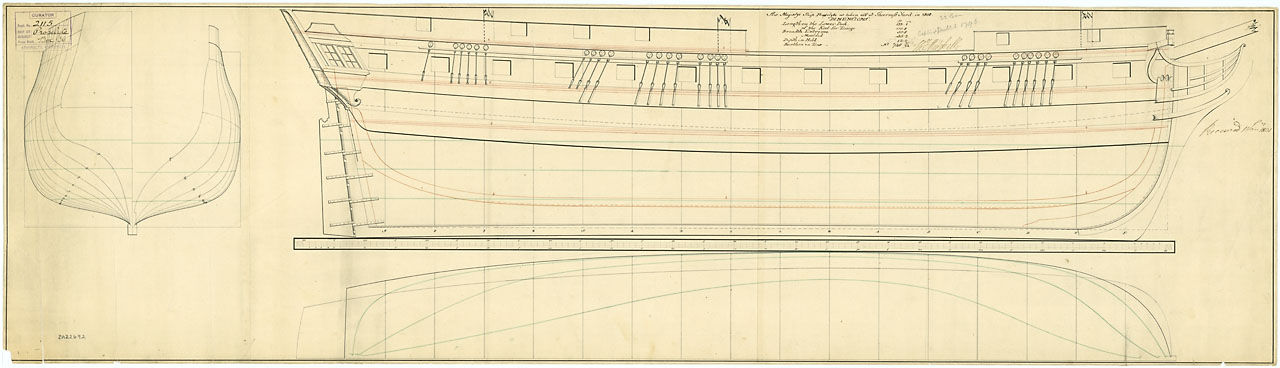
- Proselyte

History

Dutch Republic;Batavian Republic
- Name: Jason or Iazon
- Builder: Paulus van Zwinjndregt, Rotterdam
- Launched: 1770
- Fate: Surrendered by mutineers 1796

Great Britain
- Name: HMS Proselyte
- Acquired: 1796 by capture
- Fate: Wrecked 4 September 1801

General characteristics
- Type: Frigate
- Tons burthen: 74835/94 (bm)
- Length: Dutch: 145' (Amsterdam feet) (Note: All Dutch linear measurements are in Amsterdam feet (voet) of 11 Amsterdam inches (duim) each (see Dutch units of measurement). The Amsterdam foot is about 8% shorter than an English foot. The data for Iazon is from the Rotterdams jaarboekje.); British:133 ft 1 in (40.56 m) (gundeck);110 ft 8 in (33.73 m) (keel)
- Beam: 35 ft 8 in (10.87 m)
- Draught: 37' (Dutch)
- Depth of hold: Dutch:15'½; English:12 ft 0 in (3.66 m)
- Propulsion: Sails
- Complement: Dutch service: 230; British service:244
- Armament: Dutch service: 36 guns; British service; Upper deck:26 × 12-pounder guns; QD:4 × 6-pounder guns; Fc:2 × 6-pounder guns

HMS Proselyte was a 32-gun Royal Navy fifth-rate frigate. She was the former Dutch 36-gun frigate Jason, built in 1770 at Rotterdam, the Netherlands. Her crew mutinied and turned her over to the British in 1796. She then served the Royal Navy until she was wrecked in 1801.

== Mutiny ==
In 1796 Jason, under the command of Captain Gerardus Donckum, was part of a Dutch squadron that had sailed from Texel in February. She encountered difficulties and had to put into Trondheim, Norway for a refit. On 31 May 1796, Jason captured and sank the British merchant ship Maryann, which was on a voyage from Nevis to Greenock, Renfrewshire.

Following this action, political disagreement and bad treatment aboard led some of Jason's crew to mutiny. They locked the captain and his followers below deck, and sailed into Greenock on 8 June. Captain John K. Pulling, of the 18-gun brig-sloop Penguin, accepted the mutineers' surrender there. When Jason surrendered she had more than 200 men aboard, so a "great party" from the Sutherland Fencibles marched from Glasgow to Greenock to take possession of the frigate.

== British service ==
The Admiralty commissioned Jason as the 32-gun frigate Proselyte, and appointed Captain John Loring in September 1796 to command her. In British service she carried twenty-six 12-pounder guns and six 6-pounders. Shortly after her commissioning, on 20 February 1797, she sailed for Jamaica.

On 4 June Proselyte captured the French privateer Liberté on the West Indies station. Liberté was armed with six guns but had only 13 men aboard her when Proselyte captured her as the rest of the privateer's crew were away in captured vessels.

George Fowke received his promotion to Post-captain on 9 July 1798 and in December took command of Proselyte. Proselyte was part of the British fleet under the command of Vice-Admiral Sir Andrew Mitchell that constituted the naval part of the Anglo-Russian invasion of Holland in August 1799. On 8 August the British captured the Dutch hulks Drotchterland and Brooderschap, and the ships Helder, Venus, Minerva, and Hector, in the New Diep. So many vessels, or rather their crews, shared in the prize money that the share of an ordinary seaman was only 6s 8d. This amounted to about five days' wages. Proselyte was also present for the surrender of the vessels of the Batavian Republic in the Vlieter Incident. The surrender occasioned a further distribution of prize money but the London Gazette did not publish any amounts.

On 28 August Proselyte captured the Prussian hoy Zeeluft. On 11 October 1800 Proselyte and the hired armed cutter Fly captured the Proteus. The next day Proselyte captured the small French cutter Victor et Natalie, off Havre. She was sailing from Dieppe to Cancalle in ballast. Then on 1 December Loire, Proselyte, and Fly captured the Danish brig Fortuna.

Fowke sailed for the Leeward Islands in February 1801. In March Proselyte participated in Rear Admiral Duckworth's successful attack on the islands of St. Bartholomew and St. Martin. Proselyte, Hornet and Drake stayed at St. Martin to secure the island and to embark the garrison on 26 March, while the rest of Duckworth's force went on to St Thomas. Duckworth ordered Proselyte and Hornet to relieve Unite from the task of protecting the two newly captured islands so that Unite might escort the prisoners to Martinique and arrange and escort a convoy from there for Great Britain. Prize money for the "sundry articles of Provisions, Merchandize, Stores, and Property afloat" was available for payment on 14 January 1804.

== Loss ==
While under the temporary command of Lieutenant Henry Whitby, Fowke not being on board, Proselyte was wrecked on 4 September 1801. She was on her way from St. Kitts into port at St. Martin when she struck the "Man of War Shoal" in view of Philipsburg. Fortunately, boats from Philipsburg saved all the crew. A court martial on aboard HMS Magnanime at Fort Royal, Martinique, on 7 November 1801 found Whitby guilty of negligence for not heeding the warning about the danger of the reef; the court sentenced him to a reduction in rank. The board also dismissed the master, Luke Winter, from the Navy. Whitby had left him in charge of the navigation and ignored the local standing orders, which specified where the shoal was and the bearings vessels were to follow when entering port.

== Wreck site ==
Proselyte is now a popular dive site for visitors to St. Martin. She lies on her starboard side in approximately 50 feet (15 m) of water, just beyond the mouth of Great Bay at Philipsburg. Numerous cannon, ballast bars, barrel hoops and anchors are scattered around the wreck on the ocean floor, all heavily encrusted with coral, which has made the "Proselyte Reef" a popular dive site. The Sint Maarten Museum has put many artifacts retrieved from Proselyte on display.
