= Auguste-Philippe Donatien de Vimeur =

Auguste-Philippe Donatien de Vimeur, marquis de Rochambeau (26 January 1787 – 3 February 1868) was a French nobleman, military officer and politician.

== Biography ==
Vimeur was the son of Donatien-Marie-Joseph de Vimeur, vicomte de Rochambeau and the grandson of Jean-Baptiste Donatien de Vimeur, comte de Rochambeau. In May 1801 he entered the French navy as a midshipman and joined an expedition to Santo Domingo. On his return he joined the army. Upon the recommendation of Rémy Joseph Isidore Exelmans, he was made an aide-de-camp to Joachim Murat, receiving the Legion of Honour after the Battle of Friedland in 1807. After the Treaty of Naples, Vimeur left the service of Murat and resigned, retiring to his estates at Château de Rochambeau.

He was made a Peer of France on 11 September 1835 and took his seat in the Chamber of Peers. He returned to private life on his estates following the French Revolution of 1848.

== Motto and coat of arms ==
Coat of Arms	Motto
	VIVRE EN PREUX, Y MOURIR (To live and die valiantly)
