= HMS Cerf =

Brig of the Royal Navy

Cerf
History

Spain
- Name: Ciervo
- Builder: Havana
- Launched: 1794-5
- Captured: Unknown date

United Kingdom
- Name: Stag
- Acquired: By capture
- Fate: Sold 15 December 1801

France
- Name: Cerf
- Acquired: December 1801 by purchase
- Captured: 30 November 1803

United Kingdom
- Name: Cerf
- Acquired: 30 November 1803 by capture
- Fate: Sold August 1806

General characteristics
- Displacement: 170 tons (French)
- Tons burthen: 17179/94 (bm)
- Length: 74 ft 0 in (22.6 m) (overall); 66 ft 9 in (20.3 m) (keel)
- Beam: 22 ft 0 in (6.7 m)
- Depth of hold: 9 ft 0 in (2.7 m)
- Complement: French service: British service:
- Armament: French service: Originally: 8 × 9-pounder guns + 6 × 18-pounder carronades; At capture:12 guns; British service: 14 guns

HMS Cerf was the Spanish Navy's 18-gun brig Cuervo, built at Havana in 1794-95. A British privateer captured her and her captors renamed her Stag before in December 1801 selling her to the Captain-General of Guadeloupe. The French Navy took her into service as the 14-gun brig Cerf. The Royal Navy acquired Cerf at the surrender of Santo Domingo on 30 November 1803. The Royal Navy sold her in 1806.

== Prior history ==
Cerf had a complex history of ownership. She was built at Havana in 1794-95 as the Spanish Navy's Ciervo (or Cuervo). The British acquired her and named her Stag. On 15 December 1801 the Captain-General of Guadeloupe purchased her and named her Cerf.

== French service ==
From end-December 1801 she was at Dominica and under the command of lieutenant de vaisseau Drouault. She arrived at Brest, France, on 30 January 1802 with letters from Dominica; Admiral Lacrosse, the former captain-general of Guadeloupe. Magloire Pelage had replaced Lacrosse and sent him to Dominica.

Cerf then returned to the West Indies. French records state that Drouault was still her commander at the time of her surrender.

Cerf was one of numerous vessels surrendered on 30 November 1803 to a British squadron under the command of Captain John Loring in HMS Bellerophon at Cape Francois. The surrendered vessels then sailed to Port Royal. A report from Jamaica listing the surrendered vessels that had arrived there gives the name of Cerf's captain as Babron.

== British service ==
The Royal Navy commissioned her under Commander George Barne Trollope. (Note: For more on George Barne Trollope see: O'Byrne, William R. (1849). "Trollope, George Barne" . A Naval Biographical Dictionary. London: John Murray.) Cerf was Trollope's first command, and he was promoted to commander on 1 May 1804 to her. However, he was invalided home in December 1804 due to an attack of yellow fever.

On 3 July 1805 Cerf sailed to England as one of the escorts of the fleet of merchantmen sailing from Jamaica to England. As the fleet approached England Cerf was to escort the part bound for Bristol and Liverpool, but she had become leaky and was ordered to the nearest port. Cerf, Captain Chamberlayne, arrived at Plymouth on 4 September.

== Fate ==
The Principal Officers and Commissioners of His Majesty's Navy offered the "Musette and Cerf sloops" for sale on 27 August 1806 at Plymouth. She was sold at that time.
