= HMS Elephant (1786) =

74-gun Royal Navy ship of the line

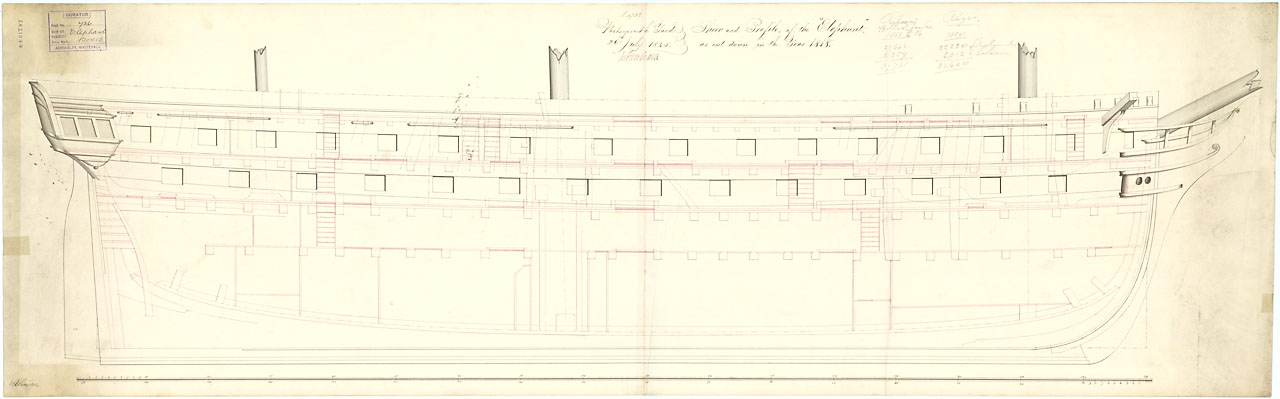
- Drawing showing the inboard profile for Elephant as cut down to a 58-gun ship 1817–1818

History

Great Britain
- Name: Elephant
- Ordered: 27 December 1781
- Builder: George Parsons, Bursledon
- Laid down: February 1783
- Launched: 24 August 1786
- Completed: 7 November 1786
- Commissioned: June 1790
- Fate: Broken up, 1830

General characteristics
- Class & type: Arrogant-class ship of the line
- Tons burthen: 1,616 49/94 (bm)
- Length: 168 ft (51.2 m) (gundeck)
- Beam: 46 ft 11 in (14.3 m)
- Draught: 17 ft 8 in (5.4 m) (light)
- Depth of hold: 19 ft 9 in (6.0 m)
- Propulsion: Sails
- Sail plan: Full-rigged ship
- Complement: 600
- Armament: 74 muzzle-loading, smoothbore guns: Lower gundeck: 28 × 32 pdr guns; Upper gundeck: 28 × 18 pdr guns; Forecastle: 4 × 9 pdr guns; Quarter deck: 14 × 9 pdr guns

HMS Elephant was a 74-gun third-rate Arrogant-class ship of the line of the Royal Navy. Launched in 1786, she served during the French Revolutionary Wars and the Napoleonic Wars, sometimes as a flagship. The ship participated in the Battle of Copenhagen in 1801 and the blockade of Saint-Domingue two years later. Elephant played a minor role in the Atlantic campaign of 1806 and captured an American privateer during the War of 1812. The ship was paid off into reserve in 1814. She was razeed into a 58-gun fourth-rate frigate in 1817–1818, but was never recommissioned. The ship was broken up in 1830.

== Description ==
The Arrogant-class ship of the line was designed by Sir Thomas Slade, co-Surveyor of the Navy. It was one of the "common" type of 74 with lighter guns than those of the "large" classes. Elephant was one of the slightly modified second batch of Arrogants. She measured 168 feet (51.2 m) on the gundeck and 137 feet 10 inches (42.0 m) on the keel. She had a beam of 46 feet 11 inches (14.3 m), a depth of hold of 19 feet 9 inches (6.0 m) and had a tonnage of 1,616 49/94 tons burthen. The ship's draught was 12 feet 6 inches (4 m) forward and 17 feet 8 inches (5.4 m) aft at light load; fully loaded, her draught would be significantly deeper. The ships' crew numbered 600 officers and ratings. They were fitted with three masts and were ship-rigged.

The ships were armed with 74 muzzle-loading, smoothbore guns that consisted of twenty-eight 32-pounder guns on their lower gundeck and twenty-eight 18-pounder guns on their upper deck. Their forecastle mounted four 9-pounder guns. On their quarterdeck they carried fourteen 9-pounder guns. Elephant's armament as a 58-gun frigate consisted of twenty-eight 32-pounders on the lower deck and twenty-eight 42-pounder carronades and a pair of 12-pounder guns on the upper deck. Her crew now numbered 495 men.

== Construction and career ==
Elephant was the third ship of her name to serve in the Royal Navy. She was ordered on 27 December 1781 and was laid down by George Parsons at his shipyard in Bursledon, Hampshire, in February 1782. The ship was launched on 24 August 1786, completed at Portsmouth Dockyard on 7 November 1786 and was immediately placed in ordinary. Elephant was commissioned by Captain Charles Thompson in June 1790.

Elephant (first from right) passing the Øresund on 30 March 1801

Elephant was placed in ordinary in October 1793 and may have had a Middling Repair over the next few years. The ship was refitted for active duty from August 1799 to March 1800 at Portsmouth Dockyard and was recommissioned in December 1799 by Captain Thomas Foley as the flagship of Rear-Admiral Sir Charles Cotton. On 27 March 1801 Vice-Admiral of the Blue Sir Horatio Nelson chose Elephant as his flagship during the Battle of Copenhagen due to her shallow draught. During the battle, the ship primarily engaged the radeau Hajen which was captured by a boarding party. After the battle ended with the Danes agreeing to a truce, Elephant ran aground on a shoal as she was withdrawing. She lost 9 crewmen killed and 13 wounded during the battle. Nelson pulled down his flag on 4 April and Elephant reverted to a private ship. Captain George Dundas assumed command in June and the ship sailed to Jamaica in October.

In mid-1803, the squadron under Captain Henry William Bayntun, consisting of the third rates Cumberland, Hercule, Elephant, and her sisters Bellerophon and Vanguard captured the schooners Poisson Volant and Superieure. The Royal Navy took both into service. The ship participated in the blockade of Saint-Domingue in the same year, patrolling off Cap-François. On 24 July the squadron, made up of Elephant, Bellerophon, Vanguard, and the third rate Theseus, came across two French 74-gun ships, Duquesne and Duguay-Trouin, and the frigate Guerrière, attempting to escape from Cap-François. The squadron gave chase, and on 25 July overhauled and captured Duquesne after a few shots were fired, while Duguay-Trouin and Guerrière managed to evade their pursuers and escape to France. Elephant remained blockading Cap-François through November. To prevent the garrison escaping, launches from Elephant and Bellerophon went into the Caracol Passage where they cut out the French schooner Découverte on 22–23 November. The French commander of the garrison there, General Rochambeau, was forced to surrender on 30 November.

The ship began a refit at Chatham Dockyard in November 1804 and was paid off in January 1805. Dundas recommissioned her in May for service in the North Sea and her refit was completed in July. Elephant's crew was paid prize money for the capture of the Dutch ship Jonge Jacob on 26 July. The ship set sail for the Leeward Islands on 4 May 1806, where she joined Rear-Admiral Alexander Cochrane's Leeward Islands Station. During the Atlantic campaign of 1806, Cochrane's flagship, Northumberland forced the 74-gun Vétéran to withdraw to Fort-de-France on Martinique on 9 June. Cochrane blockaded the port and was reinforced by Elephant and the third rate Canada six days later. Northumberland was damaged by a storm the following morning and had to be towed by Canada as the British temporarily withdrew to Saint Lucia for repairs, allowing the third rates Éole and Impétueux to reach Fort-de-France later that day. Over the following week the rest of Contre-amiral Jean-Baptiste Philibert Willaumez's squadron joined Vétéran, despite Cochrane's unsuccessful efforts intercept his ships.

Commander George Morris temporarily relieved Dundas as captain of Elephant in 1807 and the ship returned home by September. She was refitted from April 1809 to September 1811 at Portsmouth Dockyard. Elephant was recommissioned by Captain Francis Austen in July of that year. She captured the American privateer Swordfish on 28 December 1812 during the War of 1812. The ship was paid off on 7 May 1814.

Elephant was cut down to a 58-gun fourth rate from February 1817 to March 1818 at Portsmouth Dockyard, and broken up in 1830.
