= HMS Snake =

Seven ships of the Royal Navy have been named HMS Snake:

- HMS Snake (1776) was a 14-gun sloop purchased in 1776. Two American privateers captured her in 1781.
- HMS Snake (1777) was the French prize Seine that HMS Seaford captured and the Royal Navy purchased in 1777 at Antigua and armed with 10-16 guns. She was used as a slop ship from 1781 and was sold in 1783.
- HMS Snake (1797) was an 18-gun ship-sloop that, until 1809, differed only in her rig from the Cruizer-class brig-sloops. She was launched in 1797 and sold in 1816.
- HMS Snake (1832) was a 16-gun brig-sloop launched in 1832 and wrecked in 1847.
- HMS Snake (1838) was a steam tender launched in 1838 and used as a hulk for harbour service from 1863.
- HMS Snake (1854) was an Arrow-class wooden screw gunvessel launched in 1854 and sold in 1864.
- HMS Snake (1871) was an Ant-class gunboat launched in 1871. She was completed as a dockyard cable lighter in 1907 and was renamed YC 15.
