= Donatien de Rochambeau =

French Army officer and colonial administrator

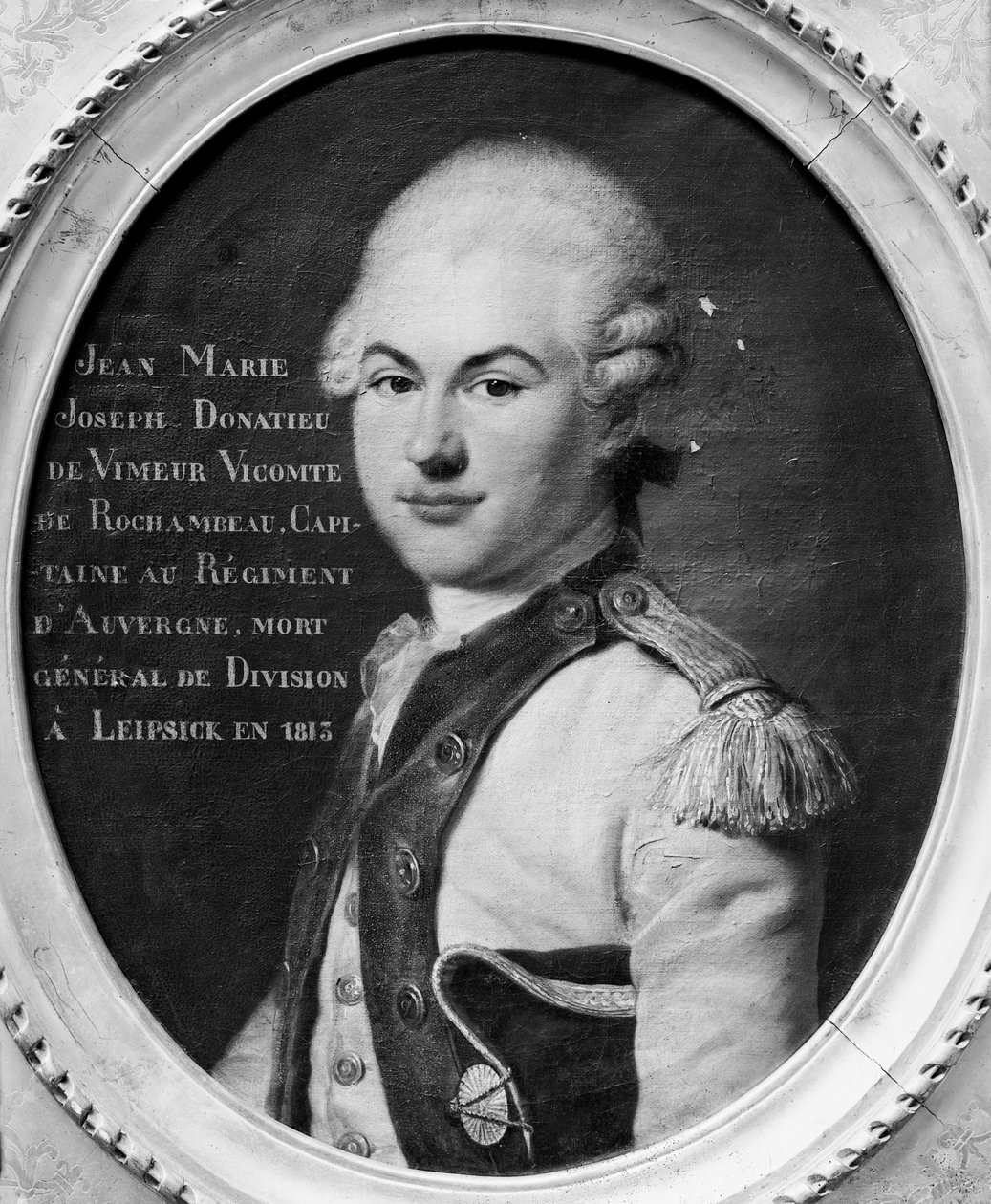
- Portrait of Rochambeau

Governor of Saint-Domingue
- In office 21 October 1792 – 2 January 1793
- Preceded by: Jean-Jacques d'Esparbes
- Succeeded by: Léger-Félicité Sonthonax (commissioner)

Personal details
- Born: 7 April 1755 Paris, France
- Died: 20 October 1813 (aged 58) Leipzig, Saxony
- Relations: Son of Jean-Baptiste Donatien de Vimeur, comte de Rochambeau
- Awards: Name inscribed under the Arc de Triomphe

Military service
- Allegiance: Kingdom of France; French First Republic; First French Empire
- Branch/service: French Army
- Years of service: 1769–1813
- Rank: Divisional-General
- Battles/wars: American Revolutionary War; French Revolutionary Wars; Napoleonic Wars; Haitian Revolution; Battle of Leipzig †

Divisional-General Donatien-Marie-Joseph de Vimeur, vicomte de Rochambeau (7 April 1755 – 20 October 1813) was a French Army officer and colonial administrator who served in the American Revolutionary War and French Revolutionary and Napoleonic Wars. He was the son of Jean-Baptiste Donatien de Vimeur, comte de Rochambeau.

== Life ==
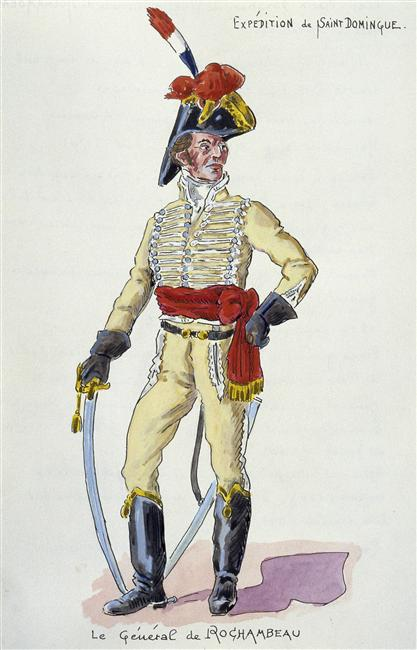
Illustration of Rochambeau during the Saint-Domingue expedition

He served in the American Revolutionary War as an aide-de-camp to his father, spending the winter of 1781–1782 in quarters at Williamsburg, Virginia. In the 1790s, he participated in an unsuccessful campaign to re-establish French authority in Martinique and Saint-Domingue. Rochambeau was later assigned to the French Revolutionary Army in the Italian Peninsula, and was appointed to the military command of the Ligurian Republic.

In 1802, he was appointed to lead an expeditionary force against Saint-Domingue (Haiti) after General Charles Leclerc's death. His remit was to restore French control of their rebellious colony, by any means. Historians of the Haitian Revolution credit his brutal tactics for uniting black and gens de couleur soldiers against the French. After Rochambeau surrendered to the rebel general Jean-Jacques Dessalines in November 1803, the former French colony declared its independence as Haïti, the first independent black republic and second independent state in the Americas. In the process, Dessalines became arguably the most successful military commander in the struggle against Napoleonic France.

During his time in Haiti, Rochambeau waged a war of extermination, massacring thousands of blacks of all ages and genders. Though the largest massacres of black men and women took place under Leclerc's leadership, Rochambeau was notable for the brutality of his methods of execution; historians generally accept accounts of blacks being burned at the stake and fed to dogs in makeshift arenas, while some disputed accounts also mention crucifixion. At the surrender of Cap Français, Rochambeau was captured aboard the frigate Surveillante by a Royal Navy squadron under the command of Captain John Loring and returned to England as a prisoner on parole, where he remained interned for almost nine years.

He was exchanged in 1811, and returned to the family château, where he resumed the work of classifying the family's growing collection of maps, which his father had begun. He also enriched the collections with new acquisitions, in particular ones contributed by the military campaigns of his son, Auguste-Philippe Donatien de Vimeur, who served as the aide-de-camp for Joachim Murat and was with Murat's cavalry in the Russian campaign in 1812. He was mortally wounded in the Battle of Nations, and died three days later at Leipzig, at the age of 58.

== Motto and coat of arms ==
Coat of arms of Donatien de Rochambeau
Escutcheon Azure, a chevron Or between three rowels of the same Motto VIVRE EN PREUX, Y MOURIR (To live and die valiantly)

== Sources ==
- "Rochambeau, Jean Baptiste Donatien de Vimeur" . Encyclopædia Britannica. Vol. 23 (11th ed.). 1911. p. 425.
- "American War of Independence" . Encyclopædia Britannica. Vol. 1 (11th ed.). 1911. pp. 843–844.
