= Flying fish (disambiguation) =

The flying fish is a marine fish family consisting of approximately 70 species.

Flying fish may also refer to:

== Art, entertainment, and media ==
- Flying Fish Records, a record label for folk, blues, Dancefloor and country music
- Flying Fish (film), a 2011 Sri Lankan anthology film by Sanjeewa Pushpakumara
- The Log of the Flying Fish: A Story of Aerial and Submarine Peril and Adventure, a marine adventure book by Harry Collingwood, illustrated by Gordon Browne

== Enterprises ==
- Flying Fish Books, a book publisher located in Tumacacori, Arizona
- Flying Fish Brewing, a brewery located in Somerdale, New Jersey
- Flying Fish Cafe, an eatery at Walt Disney World Resort
- Flying Fish Press, a publisher of limited edition artists' books established by Julie Chen (book artist)

== Ships ==
- HMS Flying Fish, a name given to several British Navy ships
- USS Flying Fish, a name given to three different US Navy ships
- Flying Fish (clipper), an American clipper ship engaged in the tea trade, constructed in 1851
- Chinese cutter Feiyu, Chinese Coast Guard cutter, formerly known as "Weihai"

== Sports ==
- Jiang Yuyan, a Chinese swimmer with the nickname "flying fish"
- Faith Leech, an Australian swimmer with the nickname "flying fish"
- Butterfly stroke, a swimming stroke, the arms of the stroke were originally called the "flying fish"

== Other uses ==
- Exocet, a French-built anti-ship guided missile, named after the French word for flying fish
- Volans ("Flying"), a constellation originally Piscis Volans ("flying fish")
