= HMS Flying Fish =

There have been twelve ships of the Royal Navy that have been named HMS Flying Fish, after the Flying Fish.

- HMS Flying Fish (1778) was a cutter purchased in 1778 and wrecked off Calais in 1782. The French appear to have refloated her and taken her into service as Poisson Volant, commissioning her at Dunkirk on 12 June 1783. In 1785 or 1786 she was struck off at Brest.
- HMS Flying Fish (1793) was previously the schooner Esperanza captured from the French in 1793, recaptured by the French in 1795 and named Poisson Volant, recaptured from the French in 1797 by HMS Esperance, and sold in 1799.
- HMS Flying Fish (1803) was previously the schooner Poisson Volant captured from the French in 1803. Renamed Firefly in 1807, she foundered in the West Indies that same year with the loss of all hands.
- HMS Flying Fish (1804) was a schooner launched in 1804 and captured by prisoners on board. She became the French 5-gun privateer Tropard, which Pheasant recaptured in 1808. She did not return to service with the Royal Navy.
- HMS Flying Fish (1806) was the schooner Revenge, purchased in 1806 and wrecked in 1808.
- HMS Flying Fish (1807) was previously the brig-sloop Flyvendefiske captured from the Danes in 1807 and sold in 1811.
- HMS Flying Fish (1817) was previously Lady Augusta, purchased in 1817 and sold in 1821.
- HMS Flying Fish (1844) was a brig launched in 1844 and broken up in 1852.
- HMS Flying Fish (1855) was a despatch vessel launched in 1855 and broken up in 1866.
- HMS Flying Fish (1873) was laid down as the Fantome-class sloop HMS Daring, renamed prior to being launched in 1873. Converted to a survey ship in 1880 and sold in 1888.
- HMS Flying Fish (1897) was a Star-class destroyer launched in 1897 and broken up in 1919.
- HMS Flying Fish (J370) was a Algerine-class minesweeper launched in 1944, given to Royal Ceylon Navy as HMCyS Vijaya, and broken up in 1975.

== Also ==
- His Majesty's hired armed schooner Flying Fish served the Royal Navy from 19 June 1804 to 15 December when HMS Aigle accidentally ran her down and sank her. On 5 September the Navy had renamed her Gertrude, but the change of name was not widely known.
