= HMS Pike (1804) =

History

United Kingdom
- Name: HMS Pike
- Ordered: 23 June 1803
- Builder: Goodrich & Co. (prime contractor), Bermuda
- Laid down: 1803
- Launched: 1804
- Captured: 18 March 1807 by French privateer Marat; Recaptured September 1808
- Fate: Unknown

General characteristics
- Type: Ballahoo-class schooner
- Tons burthen: 70 41/94 (bm)
- Length: 55 ft 2 in (16.8 m) (overall); 40 ft 10 1/2 in (12.5 m) (keel)
- Beam: 18 ft 0 in (5.5 m)
- Depth of hold: 9 ft 0 in (2.7 m)
- Sail plan: Schooner
- Complement: 20
- Armament: 4 × 12-pounder carronades

HMS Pike was a Royal Navy Ballahoo-class schooner of four 12-pounder carronades and a crew of 20. The prime contractor for the vessel was Goodrich & Co., in Bermuda, and she was launched in 1804. She captured one 10-gun enemy vessel before being herself captured, and recaptured.

== Service ==
Pike was commissioned in Jamaica in June 1804 under Lieutenant John Nichols. Lieutenant Duncan Macdonald replaced him in October. In 1806 Lieutenant C. Spence took command, and then Lieutenant John Otley replaced him in August.

On 25 August Rear-Admiral Dacres formed a small squadron under the command of Captain George Le Geyt of the 18-gun Stork. The other three vessels in the squadron were the 14-gun Superieure, the 10 or 12-gun schooner Flying Fish, and Pike. Dacres ordered Le Geyt to bring out or destroy privateers based at Batabano in Cuba.

On 30 August the squadron approached the Isle of Pines. There they sighted a Spanish schooner at anchor. Le Geyt reinforced Pike with a lieutenant and eight seamen and sent her to engage the Spanish vessel. After a short chase and two broadsides from Pike's 12-pounder carronades, the Spaniard surrendered. She turned out to be a guarda costa of 10 guns, with a crew of 45 men. Pike took possession of her and took her back to the squadron.

Le Geyt then discovered that Stork drew too much water to permit her to enter the Gulf of Batabanó. He therefore transferred to the other three vessels his boats and men and sent in the cutting-out expedition under the command of Commander Edward Rushworth of Superieure.

The landing party consisted of 63 officers and men, none of whom were from Pike. Ten men from Flying Fish remained to guard the party's boats. The party landed on 2 September and crossed some two miles of marshy ground to storm a fort at Batabano. On their way they had to break through an ambush of enemy soldiers and militia. In the process they killed two and wounded one badly. At the fort they captured six 18-pounder long guns, which they spiked. The party then proceeded to take possession of the vessels in the bay. There is some disagreement as to how many vessels they captured and took as prizes, with the total rising as high as 12. According to Rushworth's letter (an after action report), the prizes included a felucca, pierced for 14 guns but only mounting one 18-pounder, a schooner pierced for 12 guns, a French 4-gun privateer, and three Spanish privateers of one gun each. The party also burnt at least six smaller coasting vessels after having removed their cargoes. Total British casualties amounted to one man badly wounded.

On 2 September Flying Fish, Stork, Superieure, and Pike destroyed two privateers, names unknown, on the Jamaica station. One was a felucca of five guns.

Between 1 January 1806 and 1 January 1807, Pike, in company with Shark, Superieure and Flying Fish captured a French felucca of one gun. Whether or not it was one of the above vessels is unclear.

== Capture and recapture ==
On 10 March 1807, Pike, still under Otley's command, was sailing from Jamaica to Curaçao when she encountered a French schooner that fired on her but then sheered off. The next day another schooner approached, fired on Pike, and then drew off to join the first schooner. Pike endeavored to escape, but by 17 March the larger of the two French vessels commenced to gain. At daybreak on 18 March the larger French schooner caught up with Pike off Altavella (the eastern point of the island of Santo Domingo). In the 45-minute engagement that followed, Pike lost one man killed and five wounded out of her crew of about 20. Some of her crew, who were new, left their stations during the engagement and had to be driven back to their stations. With his rigging in pieces, damage to his gaff and masts and yards, and the second French schooner approaching, Otley struck Pike's colours. The French privateer that captured Pike was either Impérial, or the French 16-gun privateer Marat, or Murat.

The court martial board ruled that Otley could have better managed the encounter and warned him to be more circumspect in the future. It did recognize that his crew was raw.

In September 1808 the Cruizer-class brig-sloop Moselle, under Commander Alexander Gordon, recaptured Pike. She was commissioned in Jamaica under the command of Lieutenant Joel Orchard. (Note: While Pike was in French hands, the Royal Navy had transferred her name to Fleur de la Mer. When the Navy recommissioned the recaptured Pike, she resumed her name, and Fleur de la Mere returned to her original name.) (Orchard had been captured in 1805 by the Spanish after his ship Barracouta, Pike's sister ship, was wrecked.) On 6 July 1809 Pike was one of the vessels that made up the blockade of the city of Santo Domingo and she, and Fleur-de-Mer, were present at its surrender. (Note: In January 1826 prize money was paid for stores captured at Santo Domingo. A first-class share was worth £7 10s 11d; a sixth-class share, that of an ordinary seaman, was worth 2s 5d. In October 1832 there was another payment. A first-class share was worth £67 3s 5d; a sixth-class share was worth £1 1s 3d.)

== Fate ==
Although one source reports that Pike foundered in August 1809, Hepper, the most complete source of information on Royal Navy losses for the period, has no mention of this.

In 1811 Pike was under the command of Lieutenant J. Alexander.
