= HMS Dominica (1807) =

French privateer

History

United Kingdom
- Name: HMS Dominica
- Acquired: 1807 (by capture)
- Fate: Foundered August 1809

General characteristics
- Type: schooner
- Tons burthen: 153 bm
- Propulsion: Sails
- Sail plan: Schooner or brig
- Armament: 10 guns

HMS Dominica was the French privateer schooner J(T?)opo L'Oeil (aka Tape à l'Oeil or Tape à l'Oeuil or Tap à l'Oeil) that the British captured in 1807 in the Leeward Islands. (Note: British sources other than the after-action letter in the London Gazette give her name as Tape à L'Oeuil.) She took part in one inconclusive single-ship action before she foundered in 1809.

== Capture ==
On 17 October 1807 the British brig Superieure encountered the French schooner privateer Jopo L'Oeil about 120 leagues east of Barbados. The sanguinary engagement between the two vessels lasted an hour and a quarter, with Captain John Buller of Superieure being killed instantly by a musket ball to the head while attempting to board the privateer early in the fight. Lieutenant John G. Bird took command and continued the fight until the privateer surrendered. She had a crew of 95 men. She was pierced for 14 guns but carried only six 18-pounders plus another one on a traveling carriage. She was 32 days out of Pointe-à-Pitre Guadeloupe and had made no captures. Bird described Jopo L'Oeil as "a remarkable fine Vessel". In the fight the British lost four men killed, including Buller, and eight men wounded; the French lost five killed and 19 wounded. The brig Hawke was in sight during the engagement but was unable to close until after the fight was over. (Note: A first-class share of the prize money in 1815 for the Tape à l'Oeil was £100 5s 0½d; a fifth-class share, that of a seaman, was worth £1 10s 10d.) The British took the privateer into service as HMS Dominica.

== Service ==
The British commissioned Dominica under Lieutenant Stephen Burke. At some point in 1807 Lieutenant J. Deane may have taken command. On 3 February 1808 Dominica had an inconclusive engagement with the French privateer Victor, of 18 guns. In 1809 Lieutenant Charles Welch took command.

== Fate ==
Dominica foundered or capsized in a hurricane off Tortola in August 1809. Accounts differ as to survivors. Hepper reports that she foundered with all hands. Marx and Gosset reports that there were three survivors. The National Maritime Museum database records that there were five survivors.
