= HMS Bellerophon (1786) =

Third-rate ship of the line of the Royal Navy

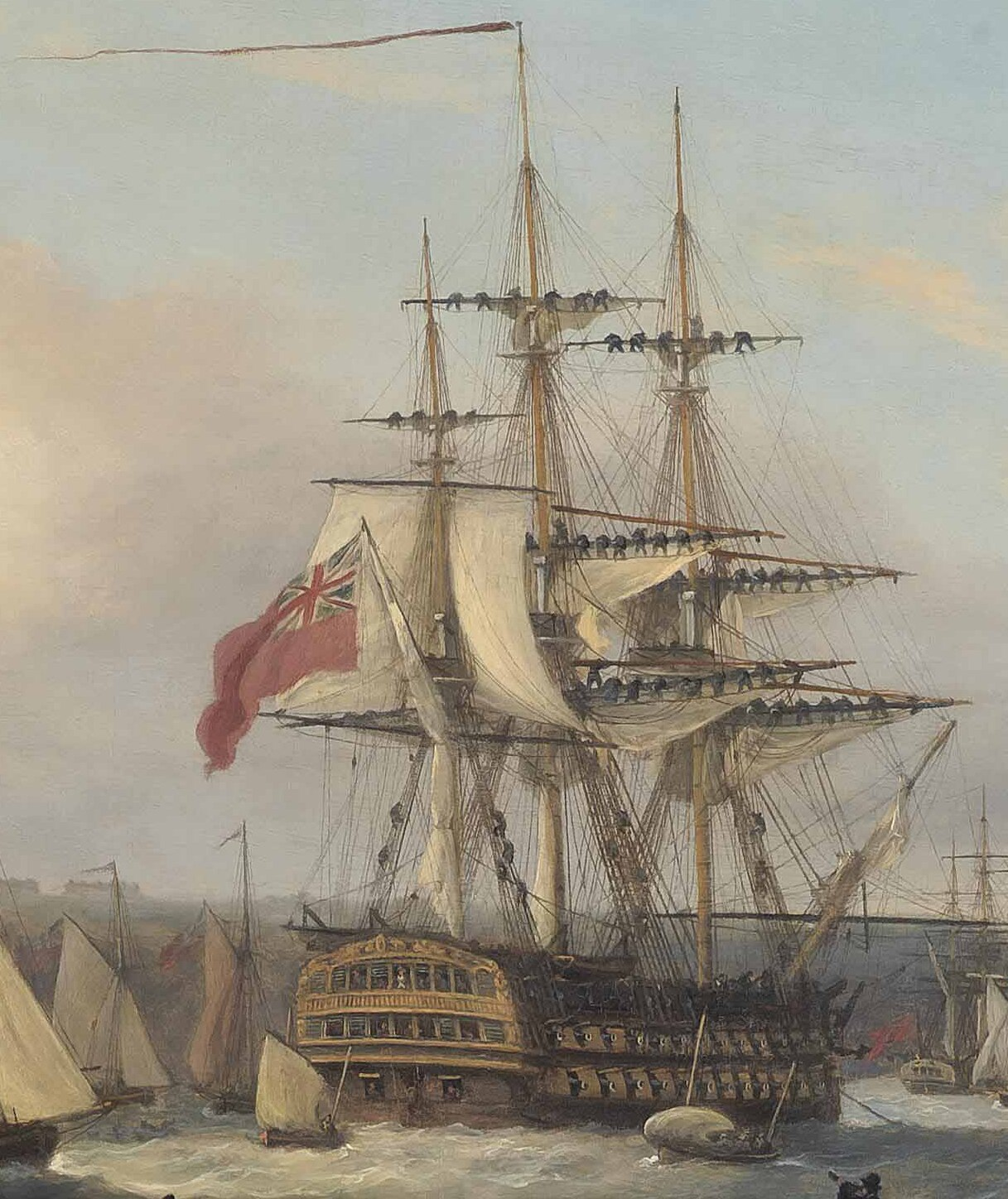
- Painting of Bellerophon in 1815

History

Great Britain
- Name: Bellerophon
- Ordered: 11 January 1782
- Builder: Edward Greaves and Co., Frindsbury
- Laid down: May 1782
- Launched: 6 October 1786
- Completed: By March 1787
- Renamed: Captivity on 5 October 1824
- Reclassified: Prison ship from 1815
- Nickname(s): Billy Ruffian
- Fate: Broken up in 1836

General characteristics
- Class & type: Arrogant-class ship of the line
- Tons burthen: 1,612 78/94 (bm)
- Length: 168 ft (51.2 m) (gundeck); 138 ft (42.1 m) (keel)
- Beam: 46 ft 10 1/2 in (14.3 m)
- Depth of hold: 19 ft 9 in (6.0 m)
- Sail plan: Full-rigged ship
- Complement: 590 (Oct 1805: 566 borne)
- Armament: Lower gundeck: 28 × 32-pounder guns; Upper gundeck: 28 × 18-pounder guns; Quarterdeck: 14 × 9-pounder guns; Forecastle: 4 × 9-pounder guns

HMS Bellerophon, known to sailors as the "Billy Ruffian", was a 74-gun third-rate ship of the line of the Royal Navy. Launched in 1786, Bellerophon served for the entire duration of the French Revolutionary and Napoleonic Wars, mostly on blockades or convoy escort duties. She fought in three fleet actions: the Glorious First of June (1794), the Battle of the Nile (1798) and the Battle of Trafalgar (1805). While the ship was on blockade duty in 1815, Napoleon boarded Bellerophon so he could surrender to the ship's captain, ending 22 years of almost continuous war between Britain and France.

Built at Frindsbury, near Rochester in Kent, Bellerophon was initially laid up in ordinary, briefly being commissioned during the Spanish and Russian Armaments. She entered service with the Channel Fleet on the outbreak of the French Revolutionary Wars in 1792, and took part in the Glorious First of June in 1794, the first major fleet action of the wars. Bellerophon narrowly escaped being captured by the French in 1795, when her squadron was nearly overrun by a more powerful French fleet at the First Battle of Groix, but the bold actions of the squadron's commander, Vice-Admiral Sir William Cornwallis, caused the French to retreat. She played a minor role in efforts to intercept a French invasion force bound for Ireland in 1797, and then joined the Mediterranean Fleet under Sir John Jervis. Detached to reinforce Rear-Admiral Sir Horatio Nelson's fleet in 1798, she took part in the decisive defeat of a French fleet at the Battle of the Nile, where she suffered severe damage and lost several officers while engaging the much larger French flagship Orient. She returned to England before being sent to the West Indies, where she spent the Peace of Amiens (1802–03) on cruises and convoy escort duty between the Caribbean and North America.

Bellerophon returned to European waters with the resumption of the wars with France, joining a fleet under Vice-Admiral Cuthbert Collingwood blockading Cádiz. The reinforced fleet, by then commanded by Horatio Nelson, engaged the combined Franco-Spanish fleet when it emerged from port. At the Battle of Trafalgar on 21 October Bellerophon fought a bitter engagement against Spanish and French ships, sustaining heavy casualties including the death of her captain, John Cooke. Following the battle, she escorted Nelson's body back to England. After repairs, Bellerophon was employed blockading the enemy fleets in the English Channel and North Sea.

Bellerophon was sent to the Baltic Sea in 1809, making attacks on Russian ships, and by 1810 was off the French coast again, blockading their ports. She went out to North America as a convoy escort between 1813 and 1814, and in 1815 was assigned to blockade the French Atlantic port of Rochefort. In July 1815, defeated at Waterloo and finding escape to North America barred by the blockading Bellerophon, Napoleon came aboard "the ship that had dogged his steps for twenty years" (according to maritime historian David Cordingly) to finally surrender to the British. It was Bellerophon's last seagoing service. She was paid off and converted to a prison ship in 1815, and was renamed Captivity in 1824 to free the name for another ship. Moved to Plymouth in 1826, she continued in service until 1834, when the last convicts left. The Admiralty ordered her to be sold in 1836; she was subsequently broken up for scrap. Bellerophon's long and distinguished career has been recorded in literature and folk songs.

== Construction and commissioning ==
Bellerophon was ordered from the commercial shipbuilder Edward Greaves and Company, of Frindsbury in Kent, on 11 January 1782 to a modified design originally developed by Surveyor of the Navy Sir Thomas Slade. She was one of ten ships built to the modified Arrogant-class design, originally developed by Slade in 1758 and used to build two ships, HMS Arrogant and HMS Cornwall.^{[a]} The design was resurrected and slightly altered in 1774, and approved by the Admiralty on 25 August that year. The keel was laid down at Frindsbury in May 1782.^{[b]} Measuring 168 ft (51 m) on the gundeck and 138 ft (42 m) on the keel, she had a beam of 46 ft 10.5 in (14.288 m), measured 1,612 78/94 tons burthen and mounted 74 guns. This armament consisted of twenty-eight 32-pounder guns on her lower gundeck, twenty-eight 18-pounder guns on the upper gundeck, fourteen 9-pounder guns on the quarterdeck and four 9-pounder guns on the forecastle.

The ship was named Bellerophon, a decision that had been arrived at by at least April 1782, when it was entered into the minutes of the Surveyor's Office. The First Lord of the Admiralty at the time, John Montagu, 4th Earl of Sandwich, had apparently selected the name from Lemprière's Classical Dictionary, which he kept on his desk. The recently ordered 74-gun ship was thereafter to be named after the Greek warrior Bellerophon who rode the winged horse Pegasus and slew the monster Chimera. The pronunciation proved difficult for the ordinary sailors of the period, and she was widely known by variants, most commonly "Billy Ruffian" or "Billy Ruff'n", although "Belly Ruff One" appears in a satirical 1810 print by Thomas Rowlandson, and "Bellyruffron" in the novel Poor Jack by Frederick Marryat. She was decorated with a figurehead of Bellerophon.

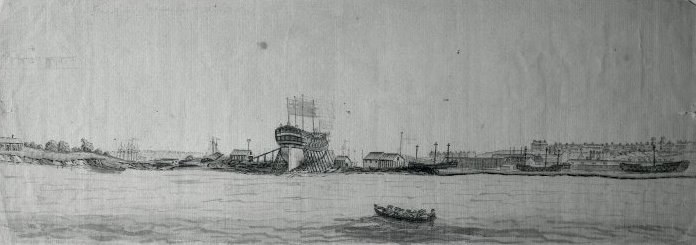
c. 1786 illustration of Bellerophon on the stocks at Frindsbury, prior to being launched

By the time Bellerophon was launched, there was no pressing need for new warships. The signing of the Treaty of Paris in 1783 brought the American War of Independence to an end while Bellerophon was still under construction. Though Greaves had been contracted to have her ready for launching by April 1784, she spent another two years on the slipway, probably because the Navy Board ordered construction work to be delayed to allow her timber to be seasoned, a luxury available now that there were no pressing military needs. When the launch came, it was delayed several times, finally taking place during a period of heavy autumn storms in October 1786. She was launched with little ceremony on 7 October 1786, by Commissioner Charles Proby, of Chatham Dockyard. She was then towed across the River Medway and anchored off Chatham Dockyard. She was taken into the dry dock there on 7 March 1787, where her hull was fitted with copper sheathing, and she was fitted for the Ordinary. Her final costs came to £30,232.14.4d paid to Greaves for building her, and a further £8,376.15.2d spent on fitting her for service.^{[c]}

Laid up at Chatham during the years of peace, Bellerophon was not commissioned until July 1790, when the crisis known as the Spanish Armament broke out. As war with Spain threatened, warships lying in ordinary began to be commissioned and fitted for sea. Bellerophon's first commander, Captain Thomas Pasley, arrived on 19 July and began the process of preparing her for service. After a month spent fitting out the ship with guns, masts, stores and rigging, and recruiting a crew, Pasley gave the orders for his crew to slip the moorings on 16 August, and Bellerophon made her way down the Medway to the fleet anchorage at the Nore.

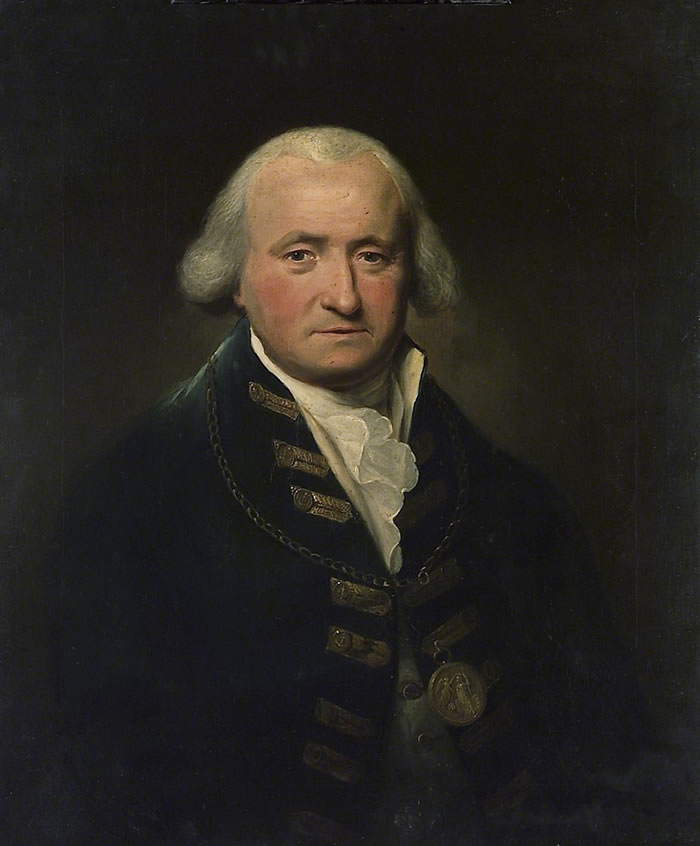
Sir Thomas Pasley, depicted as a rear-admiral in a 1795 portrait by Lemuel Francis Abbott. Bellerophon's first commander, he is shown wearing the Naval Gold Medal he won while commanding her.

From the Nore, Bellerophon proceeded to the Downs and joined the fleet stationed there. She spent three weeks in the roadstead, exercising her guns, before moving to Spithead. The diplomatic crisis with Spain had largely abated by October 1790, and Bellerophon was sent to Sheerness in late November. She remained in commission, still under Pasley, during the Russian Armament in 1791, but when this period of tension also passed without breaking into open war, Bellerophon was sent back to Chatham and paid off there on 9 September 1791.

== Figurehead ==
The ship's figurehead depicts Bellerophon, a prominent warrior of Greek mythology who was persuaded to fight the Chimaera, a monster part lion, part goat and part dragon. Using the magic of the goddess Minerva, he caught the winged horse, Pegasus, and with its help slayed the monster. The figurehead has its right arm raised, ready to strike with a javelin.

The carver is unknown but was possibly a member of the Crichley family of carvers.

In 1836, the Admiral Superintendent at Portsmouth Dockyard Sir Frederick Maitland (Captain of HMS Bellerophon 1815–1818) obtained the figurehead and stern carvings. They were placed in a mould-loft at Portsmouth but unfortunately decayed. Only the head now remains. The figurehead was commemorated in the John Player & Son's cigarette cards, 1912 series, number 6.

Both the 1786 and 1824 figureheads earned the nickname 'Billy Ruffian'; it is believed this originated from sailors who found the Greek name difficult to say.

The figurehead can be seen on display at the National Museum of the Royal Navy, Portsmouth. It can also be viewed alongside other figureheads within the collection on the Bloomberg Connects website and app.

== French Revolutionary Wars ==
Following Revolutionary France's declaration of war on Britain on 1 February 1793, Bellerophon was commissioned in March under her former captain, Thomas Pasley. Pasley fitted her for sea and sailed to join the Channel Fleet under Admiral Lord Howe. The Channel Fleet sailed on 14 July, with orders to patrol off Brest in the hope of intercepting and destroying the French fleet based there. While south-west of the Scilly Isles on 18 July, Bellerophon collided with HMS Majestic in gale-force winds. Bellerophon lost her bowsprit, foremast and main topmast, and had her figurehead and cutwater smashed, which necessitated putting into Plymouth for repairs.

After being repaired, Bellerophon rejoined the Channel Fleet, which by now was patrolling the Western Approaches. She developed a reputation for speed during these duties, and was given the nickname of "The Flying Bellerophon". In September 1793 Howe assigned her to a flying squadron made up of the fastest ships of the line, and gave Pasley command of the squadron, with the temporary rank of commodore.

On 27 November 1793, the ships of Pasley's squadron captured the French corvette Blonde. At the time of her capture Blonde was armed with 28 guns and had a crew of 210 men under the command of Citizen Gueria. A subsequent prize money notice listed the vessels that shared in the proceeds as Bellerophon, Vanguard, Phoenix, Latona, and Phaeton. With Pasley now responsible for a squadron, Bellerophon received a new commander in January 1794, Captain William Johnstone Hope, with Commodore Pasley continuing to fly his broad pennant aboard her. For the next five months the Channel Fleet patrolled off Ushant and the Brittany coast.

=== Glorious First of June ===
The Channel Fleet played an important role in the closing stages of the Atlantic campaign of May 1794, when Howe moved out into the Atlantic in the hope of intercepting an approaching French convoy under Admiral Pierre Jean Van Stabel. The main French battlefleet was also known to be at sea, under Admiral Louis Thomas Villaret de Joyeuse. Howe sent Pasley, recently promoted to rear-admiral, and his flying squadron, consisting of Bellerophon and the 74-gun ships HMS Russell, HMS Thunderer and HMS Marlborough, ahead to scout for French forces. At 6 am on 28 May the attached frigate HMS Phaeton signalled Bellerophon to report a sighting of a strange fleet. Pasley took the squadron south-east to investigate, coming in sight of a large fleet at 9 am, and counting thirty-three ships, of which at least twenty-three appeared to be ships of the line. They were confirmed as French by noon, and Pasley signalled this news back to Howe. Howe ordered a pursuit, and by evening the leading British ships, with Pasley's flying squadron forming the van, came in contact with the rear-most French. Bellerophon was the first ship to come into action, when the 110-gun Révolutionnaire dropped back to block her approach. Pasley tacked to close the French ship and began exchanging broadsides. The heavy fire of the larger French ship caused considerable damage, particularly to Bellerophon's main topmast, and she fought alone until the remainder of the flying squadron and two ships from the main fleet, HMS Audacious and HMS Leviathan, arrived to assist her. The damaged Bellerophon then drifted clear of the action, and as night fell Howe signalled for the fleet to reform in line ahead and wait for morning before resuming the engagement.

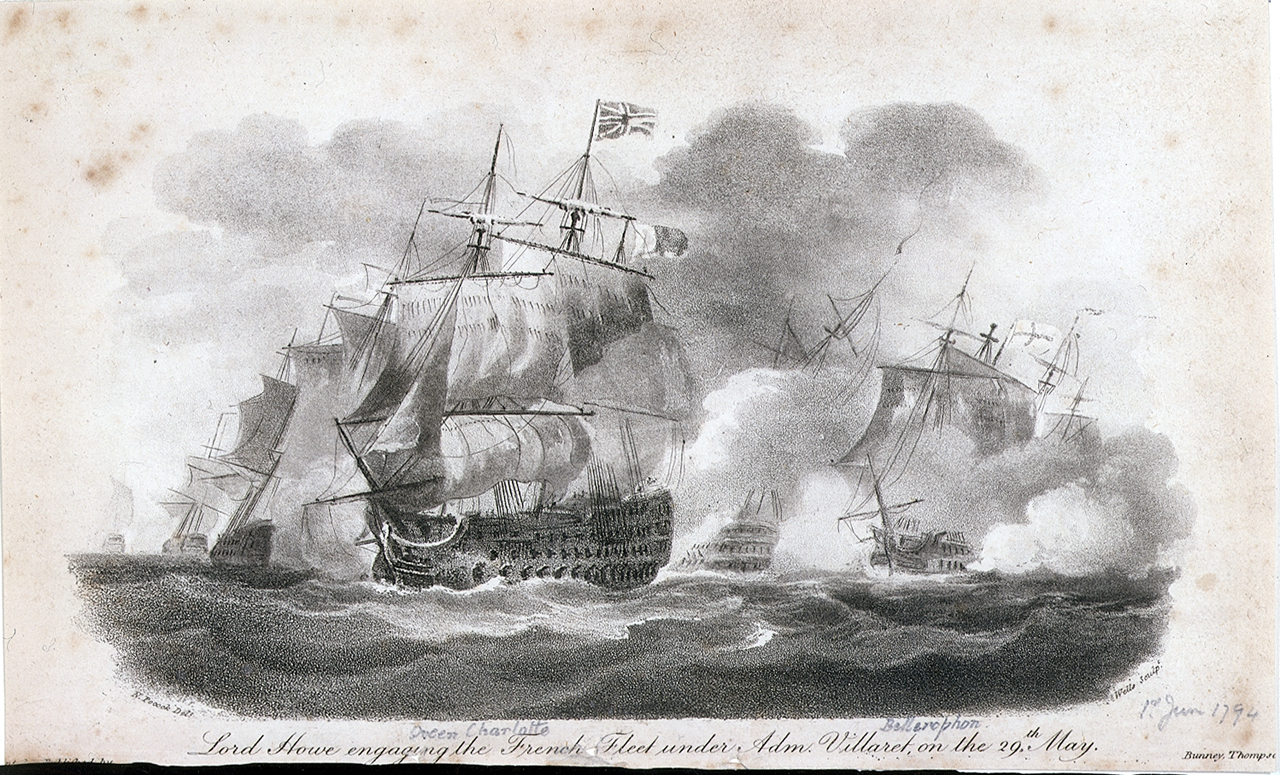
1799 aquatint of the Glorious First of June showing HMS Queen Charlotte cutting the French line. Emerging through the smoke behind her is Bellerophon.

The action resumed the following morning, with Howe closing on the French and then cutting through their line. Bellerophon followed Howe's flagship, the 100-gun HMS Queen Charlotte, and sustained some damage from French fire. Howe isolated several French ships in the rear and pounded them with broadsides, but Villaret de Joyeuse was able to bring his van about to rescue them, and the two fleets parted again at night to reform their battle lines and repair damage. Poor weather on 30 May and 31 May prevented the fleets from making contact, but the following day, 1 June, Howe was able to bring about a decisive action, later known as the Glorious First of June. The British approached in line abreast, with Bellerophon at the end of the line. As they approached, the ships were heavily cannonaded by the French. Pasley was hit in the leg by a cannonball as he stood on the quarterdeck, with Midshipman Matthew Flinders reporting that "our brave admiral lost his leg by an 18-pounder shot which came in through the barricadoes of the quarter-deck – it was in the heat of the action." When two seamen expressed their sorrow, Pasley replied "Thank you, but never mind my leg: take care of my flag." He was taken below where the shattered leg was amputated. Captain Hope kept the ship in the engagement, pounding the 74-gun Éole until the French ship was forced out of the line. Bellerophon had by then lost all three topmasts, and her mainsail and lower shrouds had been cut to pieces. Hope then signalled the frigate HMS Latona to tow Bellerophon clear of the action. Despite being under heavy fire during the battle, Bellerophon's casualties were comparatively light, amounting to four men killed and between twenty-seven and thirty wounded.^{[d]}

Bellerophon returned with the fleet to England after the battle, where the wounded Pasley left the ship. Bellerophon was taken into Portsmouth Dockyard for repairs, and then resumed her patrols in the Western Approaches with the Channel Fleet. Captain Hope was superseded in late November, and on 1 December 1794 Bellerophon received a new commander, Captain James Cranstoun, 8th Lord Cranstoun.

=== Cornwallis's Retreat ===
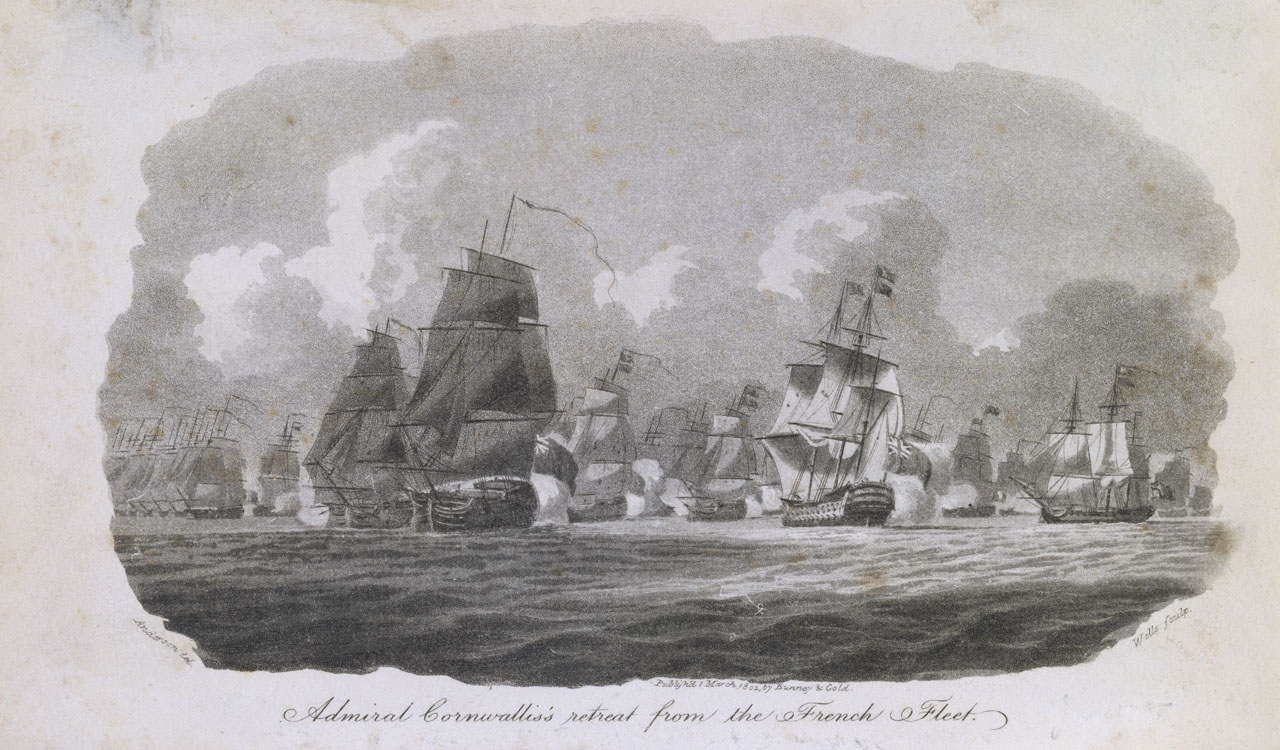
1802 engraving of Cornwallis's Retreat

Bellerophon returned to sea in May 1795 after three months anchored in the Solent. She had been at Spithead on 1 May, when the 98-gun HMS Boyne caught fire and blew up, with Bellerophon rescuing twelve men. Still with the Channel Fleet, she joined a squadron commanded by Vice-Admiral Sir William Cornwallis which was patrolling off Ushant. The squadron had arrived on station on 7 June, and the following day captured a convoy of eight French merchants off Belle Île. The squadron remained in the area until 16 June, when a lookout on Bellerophon spotted a large fleet to the east-south-east. This was the Brest fleet, consisting of thirteen ships of the line, two frigates, two brigs and a cutter, under Admiral Villaret de Joyeuse. Heavily outnumbered, Cornwallis ordered a retreat, but Bellerophon and HMS Brunswick sailed unusually slowly and he found himself being steadily overhauled by the French. Keeping his ships together, Cornwallis ordered Bellerophon to take up position at the head of his line, later explaining that "The Bellerophon I was glad to keep in some measure as a reserve, having reason at first to suppose there would be full occasion for the utmost exertions of us all ... I considered that ship a treasure in store, having heard of her former accomplishments, and observing the spirit manifested by all on board when she passed me, joined to the zeal and activity shewed by Lord Cranstoun during the whole cruize."

After a full day of pursuit, the leading French ships made an attempt to cut off HMS Mars, trailing in the British rear. Cornwallis dropped back to support Mars, while Captain Robert Stopford of HMS Phaeton began making signals implying a British fleet was in sight. When French lookouts spotted distant topsails, Villaret de Joyeuse decided that Cornwallis's actions meant that a British fleet was approaching to support him, and called off the pursuit. There was no British fleet in the vicinity; the topsails were those of a convoy of British merchantmen.

=== Irish waters ===
Bellerophon returned to England in June, before departing to patrol the Western Approaches until September. She entered Portsmouth Dockyard again in October and underwent a refit costing £8,103. She resumed patrol and blockade duty in the Western Approaches in January 1796, at first under Cranstoun, but from April effectively under the acting-captaincy of Lieutenant John Loring. Cranstoun's replacement, Captain Henry D'Esterre Darby, arrived to take command in September. Blockade duty continued until early January 1797, when news reached the fleet that a French expedition had appeared off Ireland. Caught off guard, the Admiralty ordered Bellerophon and a number of other ships to patrol off Bantry Bay. By then the French expedition had been dispersed by bad weather, and after three weeks on patrol, Bellerophon put into Cork where she rendezvoused with the Irish squadron under Admiral Robert Kingsmill. Shortly after her return to Spithead in early March, Bellerophon was given new orders by the Admiralty. She sailed on 17 March, bound for Cádiz to join Sir John Jervis's Mediterranean Fleet blockading the port.

=== Mediterranean duties ===
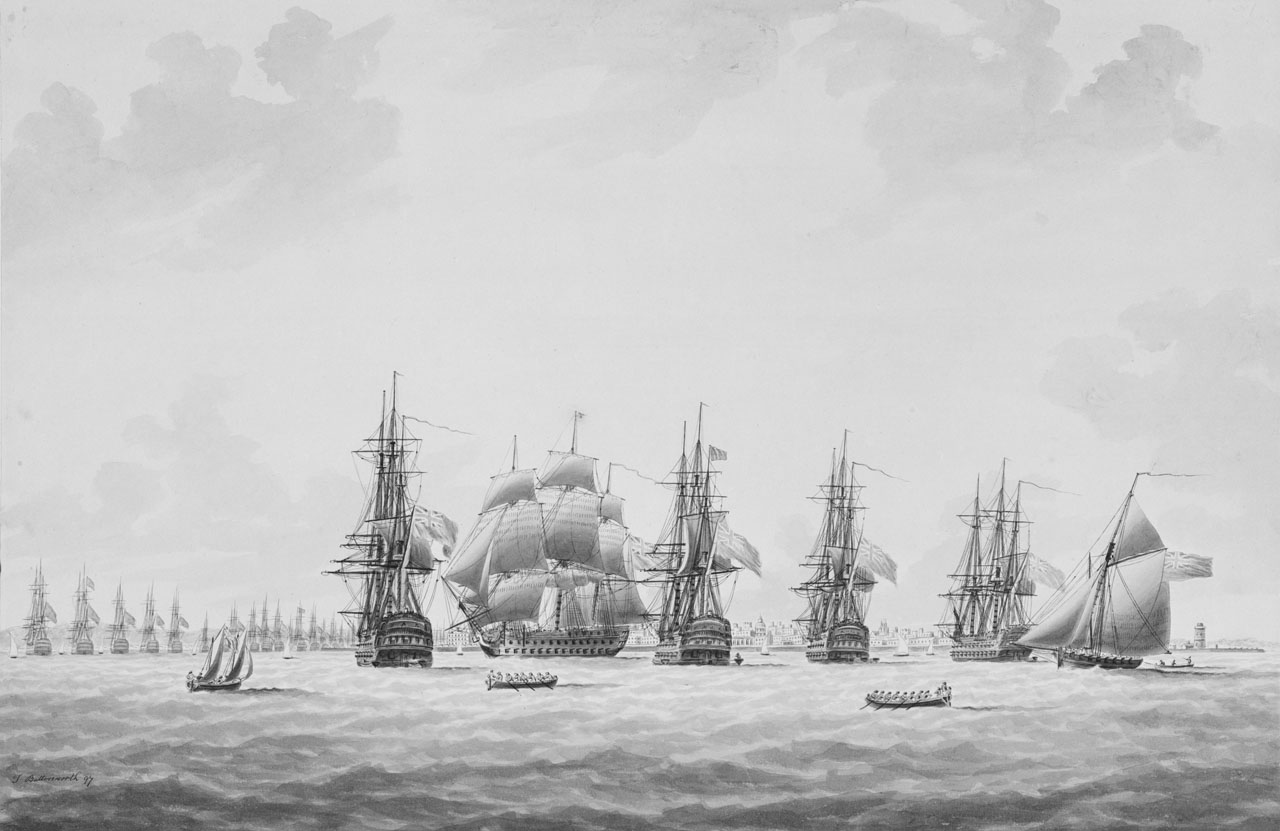
1797 engraving of the British blockading squadron off Cádiz. From left to right: Bellerophon, Orion (in port view), Theseus, Colossus and Irresistible.

Bellerophon rendezvoused with Jervis's fleet in the Bay of Cádiz on 30 May 1797. Three days later she was visited for the only time by Horatio Nelson, then a rear-admiral and in command of the inshore squadron of the blockading fleet. Bellerophon was with the fleet in the Bay of Cádiz until October, when Jervis took it to sea to patrol between Cape Trafalgar and Cape St. Vincent. These duties lasted until late May 1798, when Bellerophon was assigned to a detached squadron under Captain Thomas Troubridge and ordered to rendezvous with and reinforce Nelson's squadron. Nelson was in the Mediterranean hunting for a large French fleet which had sailed from Toulon carrying troops.

The French had embarked on a complex land and naval campaign in the Mediterranean, with the ultimate aim of launching an invasion and occupation of Egypt. The British were aware that the French had amassed a large army, led by General Napoleon Bonaparte, but their destination was unknown. Rendezvousing with Troubridge's squadron on 7 June, Nelson now had a sufficient force to engage the French, and began to comb the Mediterranean. The search lasted nearly two months, with the British force tracking westwards, and then back east, sometimes missing the French force by days. The French force, after invading and capturing Malta, arrived off Alexandria on 1 July and began landing troops. It was not until 25 July that news reached Nelson, by then at anchor off Sicily, that the French fleet had appeared off Egypt. He took his fleet to sea, and arrived off Alexandria on 1 August, but found the harbour empty. Heading east, he discovered the French fleet, consisting of thirteen ships of the line, four frigates and a number of gunboats, at anchor in Abu Qir Bay.

=== Battle of the Nile ===
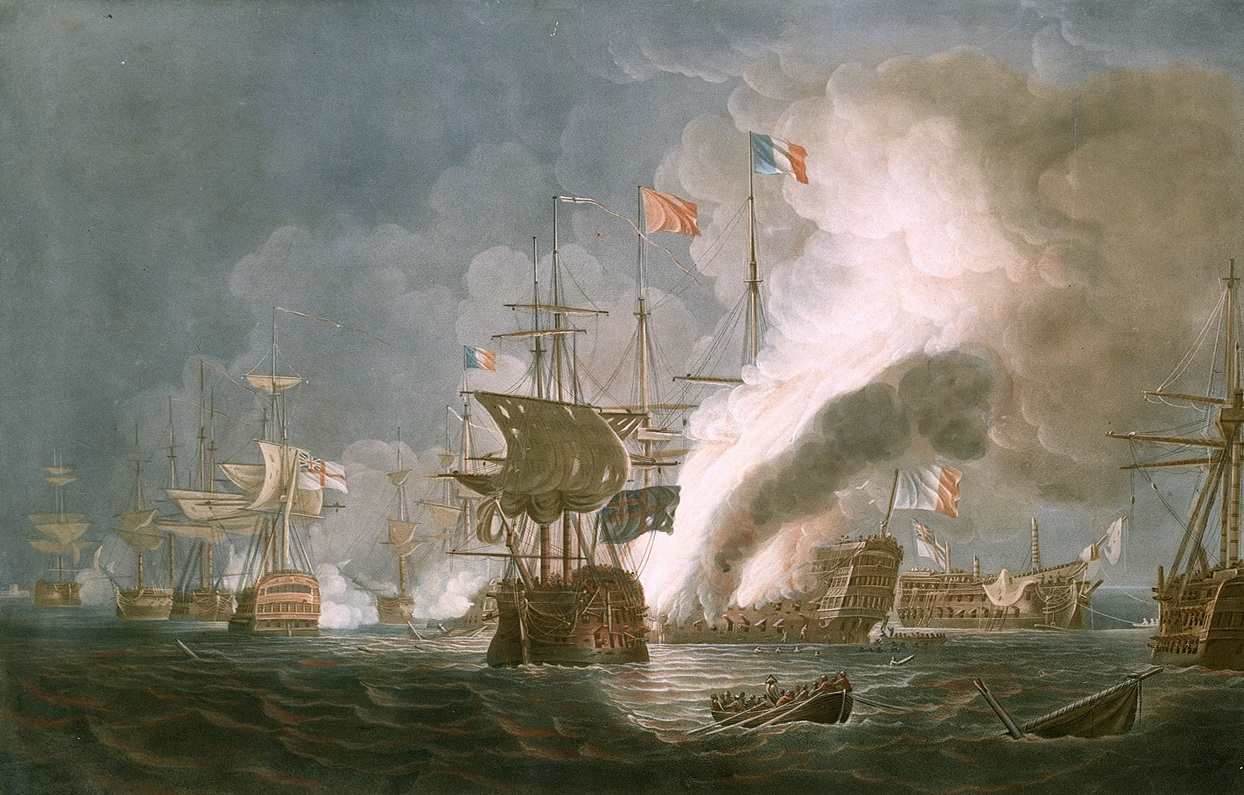
Bellerophon (second from right), shown fully dismasted, at the Nile

It was late on 1 August when the British fleet appeared in the bay, and the French were at anchor in a strong defensive position. The French commander, Vice-Admiral François-Paul Brueys d'Aigalliers, did not expect a night attack, but Nelson ordered his ships to form up and attack the head of the French van, taking advantage of a favourable wind which allowed his ships to drift down the line, while preventing the French rear from reinforcing the van and centre. Bellerophon was the eighth ship in the British line, and as the battle began, Darby turned her towards the French centre, eventually coming to anchor at 7 pm. Possibly due to some error on the part of the crew or because the anchor had dragged, Bellerophon came to rest alongside the French flagship, the 120-gun Orient.^{[e]}

Bellerophon now found herself in a desperate position. The much more powerful three-decked Orient fired several broadsides into Bellerophon, smashing her boats, dismounting guns and cutting rigging. French marines on the higher decks poured volleys of musket fire onto Bellerophon's exposed upper decks. Between 60 and 70 of her crew were killed or wounded in the first stages of the engagement, including Darby, who was rendered unconscious by a head wound. Command then devolved to the first lieutenant, Lieutenant Daniel. Daniel and the second lieutenant, Lieutenant Lander, were both wounded, but were able to direct the fighting until a shot took away Daniel's left leg. As he was carried below he was hit by grapeshot and killed outright. The fourth lieutenant, John Hadaway, was wounded and was taken below to the surgeon, while the fifth lieutenant, George Joliffe, was killed on the deck. After an hour fighting Orient alone, Bellerophon's mizzenmast collapsed, followed shortly afterwards by the mainmast. Lieutenant Lander was among those killed in the fall of the mainmast, and command devolved to the third lieutenant, the uninjured Lieutenant Robert Cathcart. Several fires had broken out on both Bellerophon and Orient. According to Bellerophon's logbook, at 9pm, when a further fire broke out on Orient, Cathcart was down below on duty, and the 13 year old Midshipman John Hindmarsh was briefly the senior officer on deck. He ordered the anchor cable cut and the spritsail was hoisted, but put too great a strain on the foremast, which collapsed. Now totally dismasted, Bellerophon began to drift away from the action, her crew fighting fires. As she moved out of the line she received some long range shots from the French Tonnant.

As Bellerophon slowly drifted away, she was sighted by the 74-gun HMS Swiftsure, approaching the centre. It was by now about 9 pm; in the darkness Swiftsure's captain, Benjamin Hallowell, was unable to identify the dismasted ship and presumed that she was a damaged French ship attempting to escape. He debated firing into her, but decided to hold fire and press on to the French centre, where he eventually came to anchor astern of Orient, close to Bellerophon's original position. Darby had by this time recovered sufficiently to resume command, and at his order the battered Bellerophon came to anchor at the east end of the bay, and her crew began making repairs. The battle raged throughout the night, and eventually ended in a decisive victory for the British. The next five days were spent repairing the ship and burying the dead. Forty-nine men were killed and 148 wounded on Bellerophon. Eight more died of their wounds in the following week.^{[f]}

Officers of Bellerophon at the Battle of the Nile.
Position	Name	Fate	Position	Name	Fate
Captain	Henry D'Esterre Darby	wounded	Master's Mates	Thomas Ellison	killed
1st Lieutenant	Robert Savage Daniel	killed	Master's Mates	James Vose	
2nd Lieutenant	Philip Watson Launder	killed	Master's Mates	John Barton	
3rd Lieutenant	Robert Cathcart		Midshipmen	Ralph Hall	
4th Lieutenant	John Hadaway		Midshipmen	Alexander Sheppard	
5th Lieutenant	George Joliffe	killed	Midshipmen	John Sadler	
Master	Edward Kirby	wounded	Midshipmen	James Maitland	
Surgeon	George Bellamy		Midshipmen	James Walker Baker	
Purser	James Heath		Midshipmen	John Hindmarsh	
Chaplain	John Fresselique		Midshipmen	Leslie Boulderson	
Surgeon's 1st Mate	John Jones		Midshipmen	Benjamin Hulke (promoted to be lieutenant of the Spartiate)	
Surgeon's 3rd Mate	John Ryall		Midshipmen	Michael Smith	
Marine Captain	John Hopkins	died of wounds	Midshipmen	Stephen W Maybury	
Marine 2nd Lieutenant	John Wright		Midshipmen	Nicholas Bettison	wounded
Gunner	John Hindmarsh (father of midshipman John Hindmarsh)		Volunteer	James Mathews	
Boatswain	James Chapman	wounded	Clerk	Harry Farmer	
Carpenter	Copernicus Thomas				

=== Britain and West Indies service ===
After carrying out temporary repairs in Abu Qir Bay, Bellerophon hoisted jury masts and, towing the captured Spartiate with HMS Majestic, sailed to Gibraltar for a refit. When this was completed she returned to Britain, arriving at Spithead on 2 April 1800, where she paid off and entered the dockyard for a more substantial refit in September. These works amounted to £32,608 and lasted until August 1801. She recommissioned on 25 June 1801 under the command of Captain Lord Garlies and sailed in August to rejoin the Channel Fleet, which was blockading Brest. Lord Garlies was superseded by Captain John Loring on 25 November, and Bellerophon continued on the blockade.

In 1802, Bellerophon was among five ships ordered to join Admiral John Duckworth's squadron in the West Indies. After taking on supplies, she sailed from Torbay on 2 March 1802. By the time of her arrival on 27 March, the Treaty of Amiens had been signed, so Britain and France were at peace. For the next eighteen months Bellerophon cruised in the Jamaica Passage and escorted merchant convoys between Jamaica and Halifax, Nova Scotia.

== Napoleonic Wars ==
=== West Indies and return to Britain ===
Bellerophon was in the West Indies when the Napoleonic Wars broke out in May 1803. Her captain, John Loring, was appointed commodore of the British squadron, which quickly went on the offensive against French shipping in the Blockade of Saint-Domingue. In mid-1803, the squadron under Captain Henry William Bayntun, consisting of HMS Bellerophon, Cumberland, Hercule, Elephant, and Vanguard captured the French privateers Poisson Volant and Superieure. The Royal Navy took both into service. The corvette Mignonne and a brig were captured in late June, after which the British patrolled off Cap-François. On 24 July the squadron, made up of Bellerophon and the 74-gun ships HMS Elephant, HMS Theseus and HMS Vanguard, came across two French 74-gun ships, Duquesne and Duguay-Trouin, and the frigate Guerrière, attempting to escape from Cap-François. The squadron gave chase, and on 25 July overhauled and captured Duquesne after a few shots were fired, while Duguay-Trouin and Guerrière managed to evade their pursuers and escape to France. One man was killed aboard Bellerophon during the pursuit. She remained blockading Cap-François until November, when the French commander of the garrison there, General Rochambeau, approached Loring and requested to be allowed to evacuate his men, which were being besieged by a native Haitian force led by Jean-Jacques Dessalines. To prevent Rochambeau escaping, Loring sent launches from Bellerophon and Elephant into the Caracol Passage where they cut out the French schooner Découverte on 22–23 November. The French formally surrendered on 30 November and were allowed to evacuate on three frigates, Surveillante, Clorinde, and Vertu, and a number of smaller ships, and were escorted to Jamaica by the squadron.

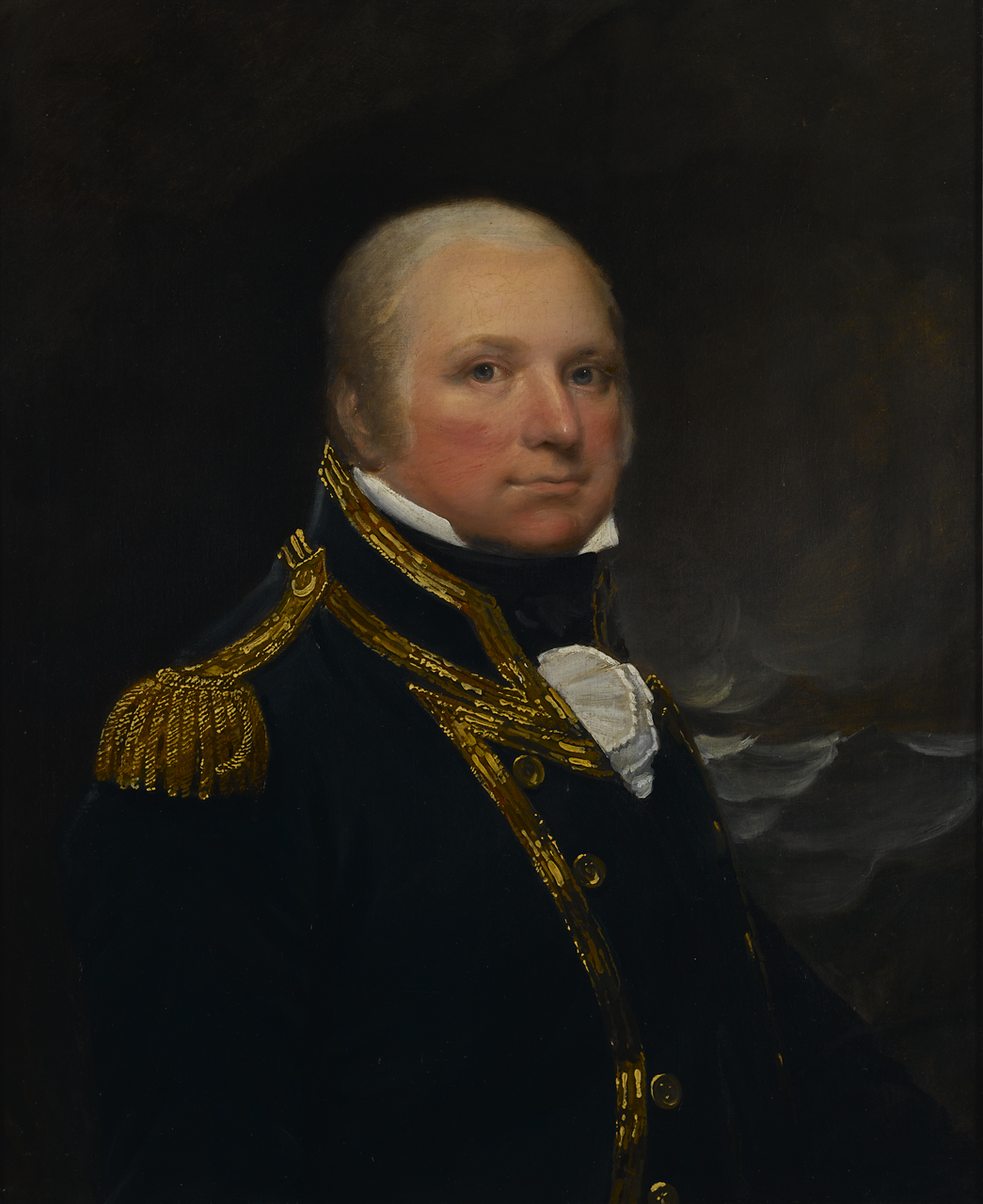
John Cooke, Bellerophon's captain at Trafalgar

A particularly severe outbreak of malaria struck the ship in early February 1804; 212 members of Bellerophon's crew fell ill. 17 died aboard the ship, while 100 had to be transferred to a shore-based hospital, where a further 40 died. She was ordered back to Britain in June, escorting a large convoy, and arrived in the Downs on 11 August. She briefly paid off and was taken into Portsmouth Dockyard for a refit. On 27 September four shipwrights working in the magazine by candle light set off some loose powder. The explosion killed all four.

Bellerophon rejoined the Channel Fleet, still off Brest, and under the command of Admiral Sir William Cornwallis. These duties lasted until early 1805, with Loring being superseded by Captain John Cooke on 24 April.

=== Approach to Trafalgar ===
In May 1805 a large French fleet under the command of Vice-Admiral Pierre-Charles Villeneuve escaped from Toulon. Bellerophon was dispatched with a squadron under Vice-Admiral Cuthbert Collingwood to patrol the Straits of Gibraltar. Before they could arrive, Villeneuve had collected Spanish reinforcements under Admiral Federico Gravina, and had sailed into the Atlantic, pursued by Nelson's Mediterranean Fleet. While Nelson chased Villeneuve around the West Indies without making contact, Collingwood mounted a blockade of Cádiz. His squadron was still there in mid-August when Villeneuve appeared off the port with his fleet. Possessing too few ships to intercept the combined fleet, Collingwood allowed them to enter Cádiz, and then remounted the blockade. He was reinforced with a number of ships over the next few months, with Nelson taking over command on 28 September.

=== Battle of Trafalgar ===
Nelson mounted a loose blockade of the combined fleet, keeping most of his fleet out of sight, but with a line of frigates and larger ships stationed at intervals between himself and Cádiz. On 19 October the combined fleet was observed to be putting to sea, and the signal was passed down the line of ships. William Pryce Cumby, Bellerophon's first lieutenant, was first in the main fleet to spot the signal, flying from the last ship in the communication link, HMS Mars. The British began to pursue the combined fleet as it made its way towards the Straits of Gibraltar, and came in sight of it on the morning of 21 October. The officers and sailors of Bellerophon prepared for battle, some of the gun crews chalking the words "Victory or Death" on their gun barrels. At 11 am Bellerophon's signal midshipman, John Franklin, noted that Nelson had hoisted the signal "England expects that every man will do his duty", and an hour and a half later Bellerophon entered the battle as the fifth ship in Collingwood's lee column. She was astern of the 80-gun HMS Tonnant and ahead of the 74-gun HMS Achille, with the 74-gun HMS Colossus close by her port side.

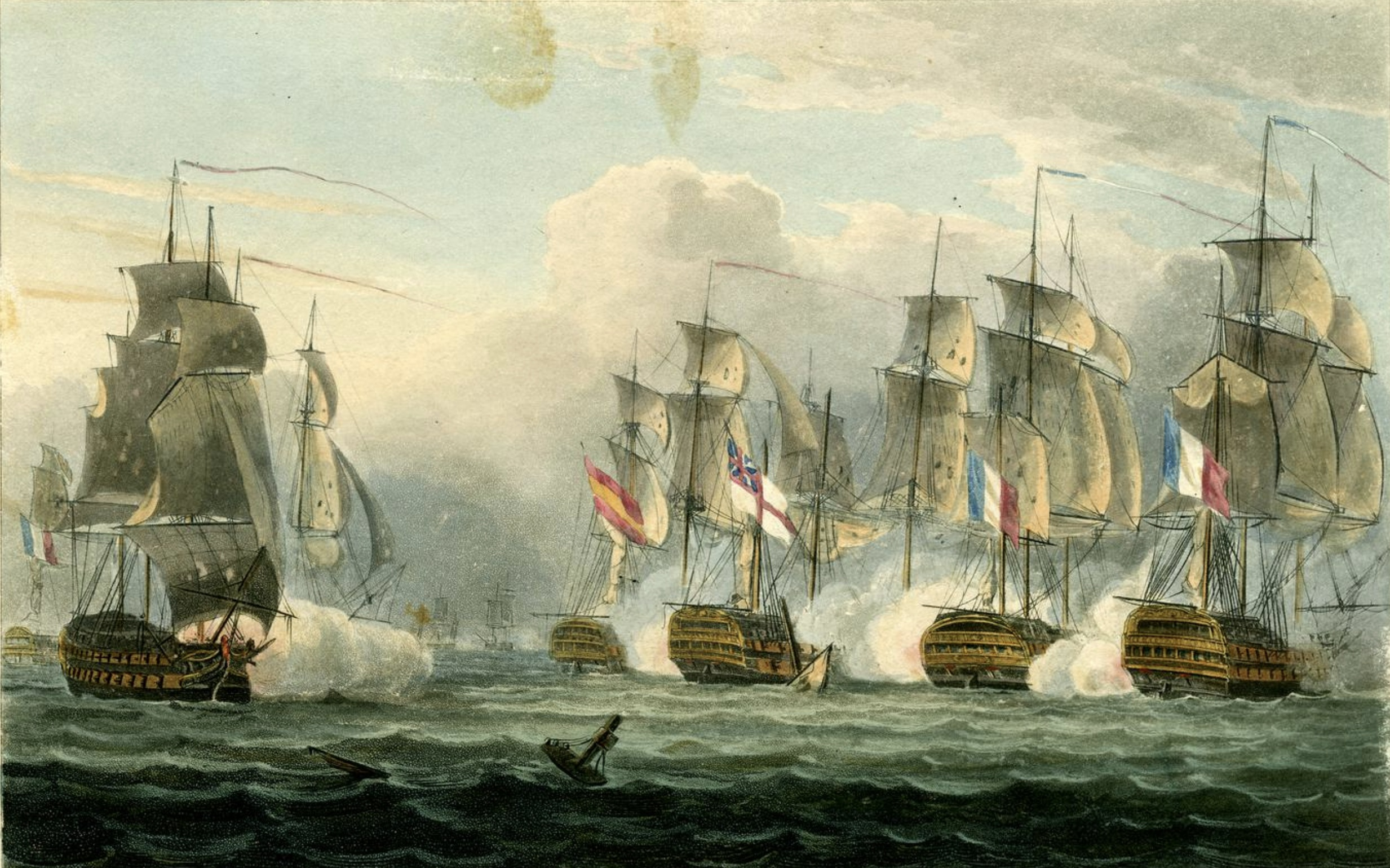
Bellerophon surrounded by enemy ships at the moment of Cooke's death

At 12:30 pm, Bellerophon cut through the enemy line, slipping under the stern of the Spanish 74-gun Monarca and firing two broadsides into her. Moving past the Spanish ship, Bellerophon collided with the French 74-gun Aigle, hitting Aigle's port quarter with her starboard bow, and entangling the two ships' yards. Locked together, they exchanged broadsides at close range, with soldiers aboard Aigle sweeping Bellerophon's decks with musket fire and grenades. Cumby noticed that the officers were being targeted, and that Cooke's distinctive epaulettes marked him out. Cumby urged him to take them off, only for Cooke to reply "It is too late now to take them off. I see my situation but I will die like a man." Bellerophon was now sustaining fire from Aigle and three other ships, the Spanish San Juan Nepomuceno and Bahama, and the French Swiftsure. Bellerophon's main and mizzenmasts were shot away at 1 pm, and at 1:11 pm, Captain Cooke was hit and killed. An eyewitness recorded that

He had discharged his pistols very frequently at the enemy, who as often attempted to board, and he had killed a French officer on his own quarterdeck. He was in the act of reloading his pistols ... when he received two musket-balls in the breast. He immediately fell, and upon the quartermaster going up and asking him if he should take him down below, his answer was "No, let me lie quietly one minute. Tell Lieutenant Cumby never to strike."

With Cooke dead, Cumby assumed command. Bellerophon's decks had largely been cleared by French fire, and boarding parties began to make their way onto the ship. Several French sailors climbed out onto Bellerophon's spritsail yard, but a Bellerophon crewman released the brace holding the yard, causing them to fall into the sea. French sailors holding onto Bellerophon's rails had their hands beaten until they were forced to let go. Bellerophon's ensign had been shot away three times, so infuriating her yeoman of signals, Christopher Beaty, that he took the largest Union Jack he could find and climbed up into the mizzen rigging and hoisted it across the shrouds. The French riflemen on Aigle reportedly held their fire as he did this, in admiration of his bravery. The two ships were so close together that gun crews on their lower decks were fighting hand to hand at the gunports, while grenades lobbed through the ports caused heavy casualties. One grenade thrown into Bellerophon exploded in the gunner's storeroom, blowing open the door but blowing closed the door of the magazine. The resulting fire was quickly extinguished, preventing a catastrophic explosion.

By 1:40 pm, having been under heavy fire for over an hour, Aigle's crew lowered her gunports and slowly moved away. When the smoke cleared, Cumby noticed that the Spanish Monarca, which Bellerophon had first engaged, had struck her colours. Cumby sent an officer in a boat to take possession of her. Bellerophon's crew now worked to make repairs and clear away wreckage. She briefly fired her guns again when the van of the combined fleet, led by Rear-Admiral Pierre Dumanoir le Pelley, made a belated attempt to come to the assistance of the centre and rear. The attack was beaten off, and at 5 pm, Bellerophon's guns ceased firing. At 5:30 pm Cumby sent a boat to take possession of Bahama, which had also struck her colours. By the end of the battle Bellerophon had sustained casualties of 27 men killed and 123 wounded. Among the dead were her captain, the master, John Overton, and midshipman John Simmons.

=== Storm and return ===
For the next seven days, Bellerophon's crew were occupied in repairing damage, rigging jury masts, and trying to ride out the storm that struck the area immediately after the battle. She put into Gibraltar on 28 October 1805, and underwent emergency repairs to allow her to return to England as an escort for HMS Victory, together with HMS Belleisle. Both Belleisle and Bellerophon required urgent attention, but it was deemed appropriate that they should have the honour of accompanying Nelson's body back to Britain aboard Victory. Cumby was superseded on 3 November, the day before beginning the voyage home, by Captain Richard Thomas.^{[g]} Thomas was himself superseded the next day by Captain Edward Rotheram, who had commanded Collingwood's flagship, HMS Royal Sovereign, during the battle.

The three ships sailed together as far as Start Point, where on 2 December Victory separated to head to Portsmouth, while Bellerophon and Belleisle put into Cawsand Bay. Bellerophon was then taken into Plymouth Dockyard to be repaired, returning to active duty on 26 February, still under Rotheram's command. Joining the Channel Fleet once more, Bellerophon resumed her usual duties, blockading and patrolling off Ushant and Brest.

=== Baltic Sea ===
Rotheram's command lasted for two and half years, until he was superseded on 8 June 1808 by Captain Samuel Warren. Warren was ordered to take Bellerophon and join the fleet in the North Sea, blockading the Dutch ports. She formed part of Rear-Admiral Alan Gardner's squadron. By 1809 the strategic situation in the Baltic had deteriorated after Russia signed the Treaties of Tilsit and began to support France. Bellerophon was ordered to join the fleet stationed in the Baltic under Admiral Sir James Saumarez. Saumarez dispatched Bellerophon and HMS Minotaur north to the Gulf of Finland in June, and on 19 June the two ships came across three suspicious looking luggers, anchored off Hango. The water was too shallow to allow them to approach the luggers, so a boat party was dispatched under Bellerophon's Lieutenant Robert Pilch. The British boarded the luggers, but found themselves in a trap, when numerous Russian shore batteries and several gunboats opened fire on them. Pilch promptly ordered the luggers to be burnt, reboarded his men and landed them next to the nearest Russian shore battery. The battery, defended by 100 sailors, was stormed and carried; the British spiked the guns and destroyed the magazine before returning to the ships with only five men wounded.

By July Bellerophon was part of a squadron commanded by Captain Thomas Byam Martin of HMS Implacable. They were off Percola Point on 7 July when a flotilla of eight Russian gunboats was sighted. A boat party led by Lieutenant Hawkey of Implacable made an attempt to cut-out the vessels that evening. Hawkey was killed in the attempt, but Bellerophon's Lieutenant Charles Allen took over command, and six of the gunboats were captured, and a seventh destroyed, with 12 craft containing stores for the Russian Army also being taken. Bellerophon made several cruises during the rest of the year, visiting Åland and Karlskrona, before returning to Britain with a convoy in November 1809.

=== Blockade duty ===
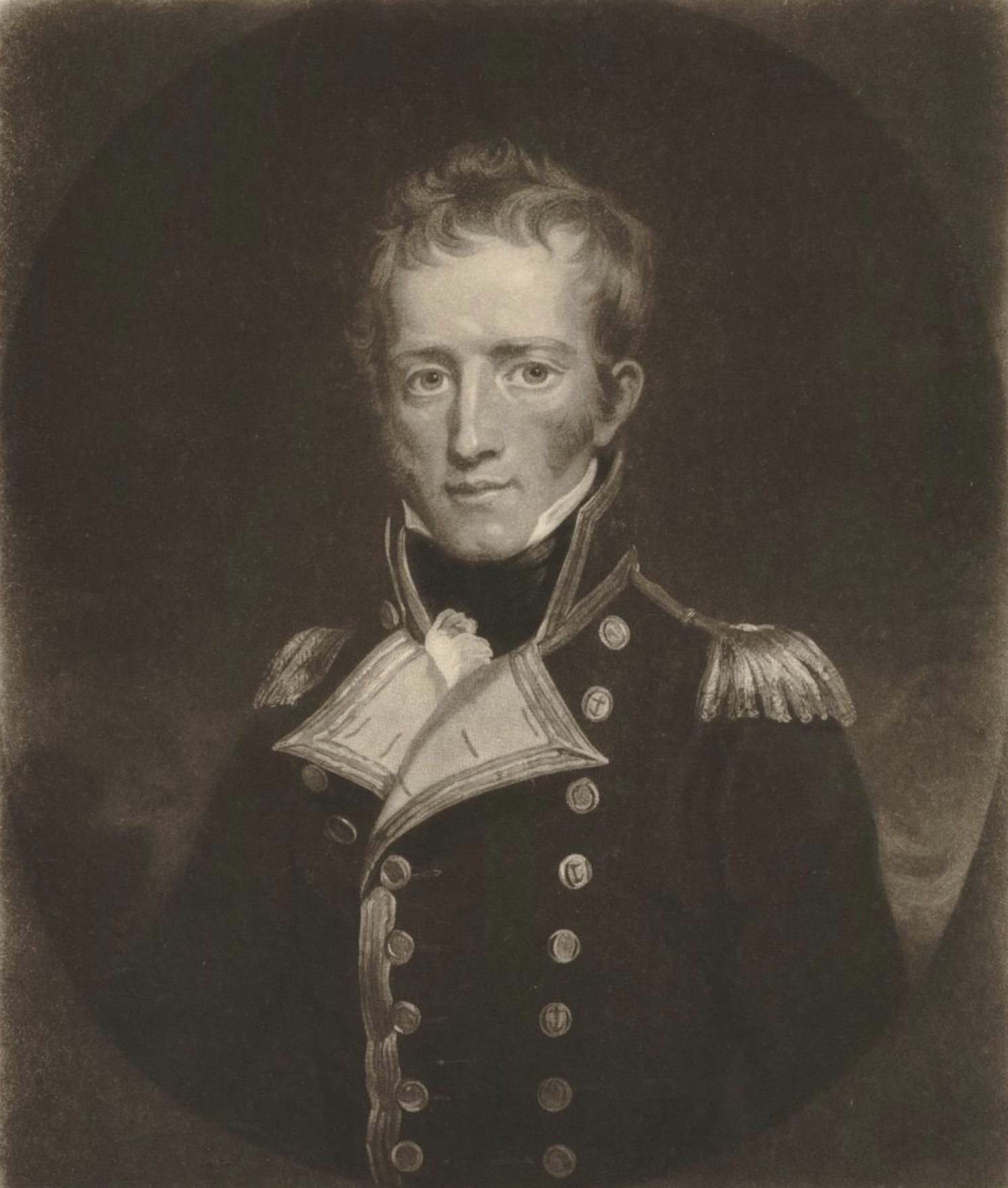
Frederick Maitland, Bellerophon's last captain

Bellerophon was briefly refitted in January 1810, after which she was anchored at the Nore. She then resumed her blockade duties in the North Sea, serving under a succession of commanders. Warren was succeeded by Captain John Halsted on 23 August, and he by Captain Augustus Brine on 5 November. Brine's command lasted until February 1813, during which time Bellerophon remained with the North Sea blockading squadron. Captain Edward Hawker took over command on 11 February 1813. On 7 April the flag was flown for the convoy to North America to assemble. Shortly thereafter, Bellerophon was joined by Vice-Admiral Sir Richard Goodwin Keats, the newly appointed Governor of Newfoundland and the convoy departed. After picking up a smaller convoy at Torbay the fleet comprised eighty-four vessels, all arriving safely at St. John's, Newfoundland on 31 May.

With the War of 1812 underway in North America, Bellerophon then sailed south to Bermuda as a convoy escort. Returning to St. John's in the summer, she captured several American ships, including the 16-gun privateer Genie. She spent the rest of the year patrolling off Cape Race. In need of further work in the docks she accompanied Sir Richard Goodwin Keats on his return to Britain with a convoy in November 1813. The year 1814 was spent on similar duties: Bellerophon carried Governor Keats back to Newfoundland while escorting a convoy to St. John's between April and June, and then patrolled off Cape Race until December. She then moved to the Nore, and on 9 April 1815 Hawker was replaced by Captain Frederick Maitland.

== Napoleon's surrender ==
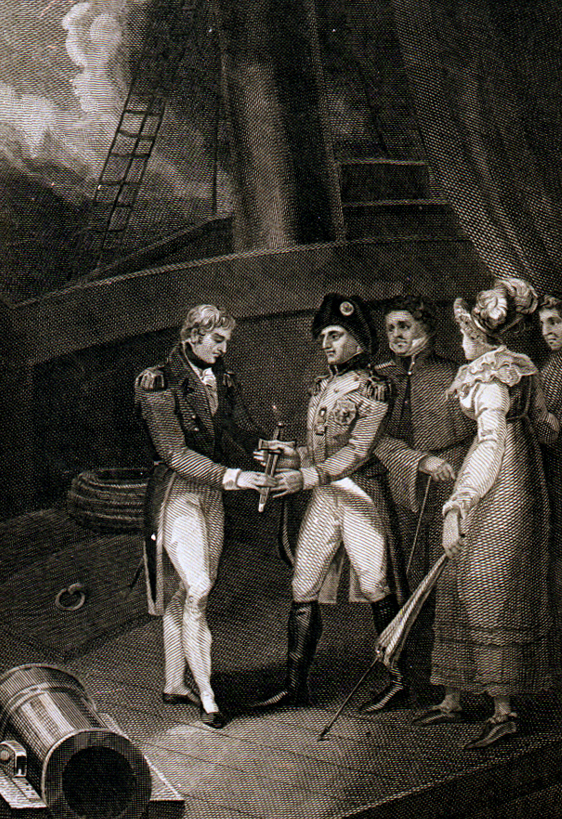
Napoleon surrendering to Maitland onboard Bellerophon

In May Bellerophon sailed to Plymouth, where she joined a squadron under Rear-Admiral Sir Henry Hotham with orders to blockade French Atlantic ports. Hotham, flying his flag in HMS Superb, sent Maitland in Bellerophon to watch Rochefort, where two French frigates, a brig and a corvette were lying in the harbour. Bellerophon spent over a month on this station, patrolling the approaches to the port and intercepting coastal vessels. Meanwhile, Napoleon had been defeated at the Battle of Waterloo on 18 June; on 2 July he arrived in Rochefort. Following the defeat of his armies, and expecting the imminent restoration of the Bourbon monarchy, Napoleon hoped to sail to exile in the United States. News reached Maitland in early July that Napoleon was in Rochefort. Two 20-gun ships, HMS Myrmidon and HMS Slaney, were sent to reinforce Bellerophon and patrol the other entrances to the port.

Napoleon was being pressured to leave French soil by the interim French government in Paris. If he delayed, he risked becoming a prisoner of the Bourbons, Prussians or Austrians. The alternative was to surrender to the British and request political asylum. On 10 July Napoleon sent two emissaries, General Anne Jean Marie René Savary and the Comte de Las Cases, out to Bellerophon to meet Maitland and discuss the possibility of allowing Napoleon to travel to the United States. Maitland was under orders to prevent this, and instead offered to take Napoleon on board his ship and transport him and his retinue to Britain. Further discussions and negotiations took place over the next few days, but with his options running out, Napoleon had decided by 13 July to surrender to the British.^{[h]} On 14 July Maitland was given a letter informing him that Napoleon would come out to Bellerophon the following morning to surrender.

Napoleon embarked aboard the brig Épervier early in the morning of 15 July, and made his way out to Bellerophon. As he approached, the 74-gun Superb, flying Vice-Admiral Hotham's flag, was sighted approaching. Concerned that the brig might not reach Bellerophon before Superb arrived, and that consequently Hotham would take over and receive Napoleon himself, Maitland sent Bellerophon's barge to collect the former Emperor and transfer him to the ship. At some point between 6 and 7 a.m., the barge pulled alongside Bellerophon and General Henri Gatien Bertrand climbed aboard, followed by Napoleon. The ship's marines came to attention, and Napoleon walked to the quarterdeck, took his hat off to Maitland and in French announced "I am come to throw myself on the protection of your Prince and your laws." Maitland bowed in response. With the former emperor in custody aboard a British warship, the Napoleonic Wars were finally over. To maritime historian David Cordingly, this moment was Bellerophon's "crowning glory [when] six weeks after the battle of Waterloo, ... Napoleon, trapped in Rochefort, surrendered to the captain of the ship that had dogged his steps for more than twenty years."

=== Napoleon on Bellerophon ===
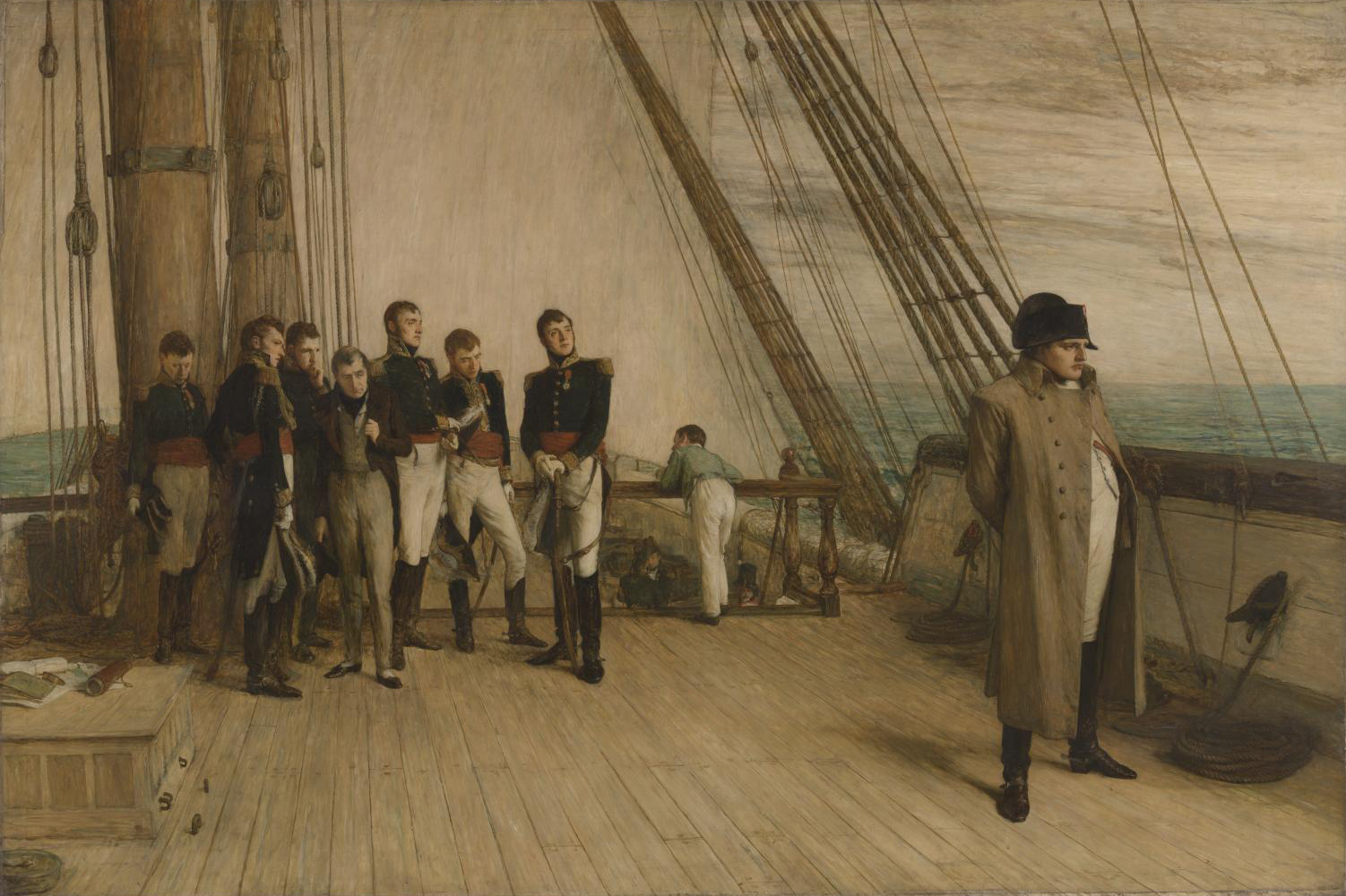
Napoleon watching the French shoreline recede from Bellerophon's poop deck on 23 July

Maitland showed Napoleon the great cabin, which he had placed at his disposal, and gave him a tour of his ship. At 10:30 a.m., Superb anchored in the roadstead and Maitland went to make his report. Hotham approved of his arrangements, and agreed that Napoleon should be transported to England aboard Bellerophon. He came aboard himself to meet the former Emperor, and a grand dinner was held in the great cabin, attended by Napoleon's retinue and British officers. The following day Napoleon visited Hotham on Superb, and after his return, Maitland began the voyage to England in company with HMS Myrmidon. A routine was soon developed, with Napoleon usually taking a walk on deck around 5 p.m., followed by a formal dinner at 6 p.m. The sailors and officers removed their hats and kept their distance when Napoleon came on deck, talking with him only if he invited them to. The routine was broken slightly early in the morning of 23 July, when Napoleon appeared at dawn, as Bellerophon came in sight of Ushant, the last piece of French land visible for the remainder of the journey. He climbed up to the poop deck, attended by a midshipman, and spent the morning watching the coastline slowly recede from view. He was joined by members of his retinue, though he did not speak to any of them.

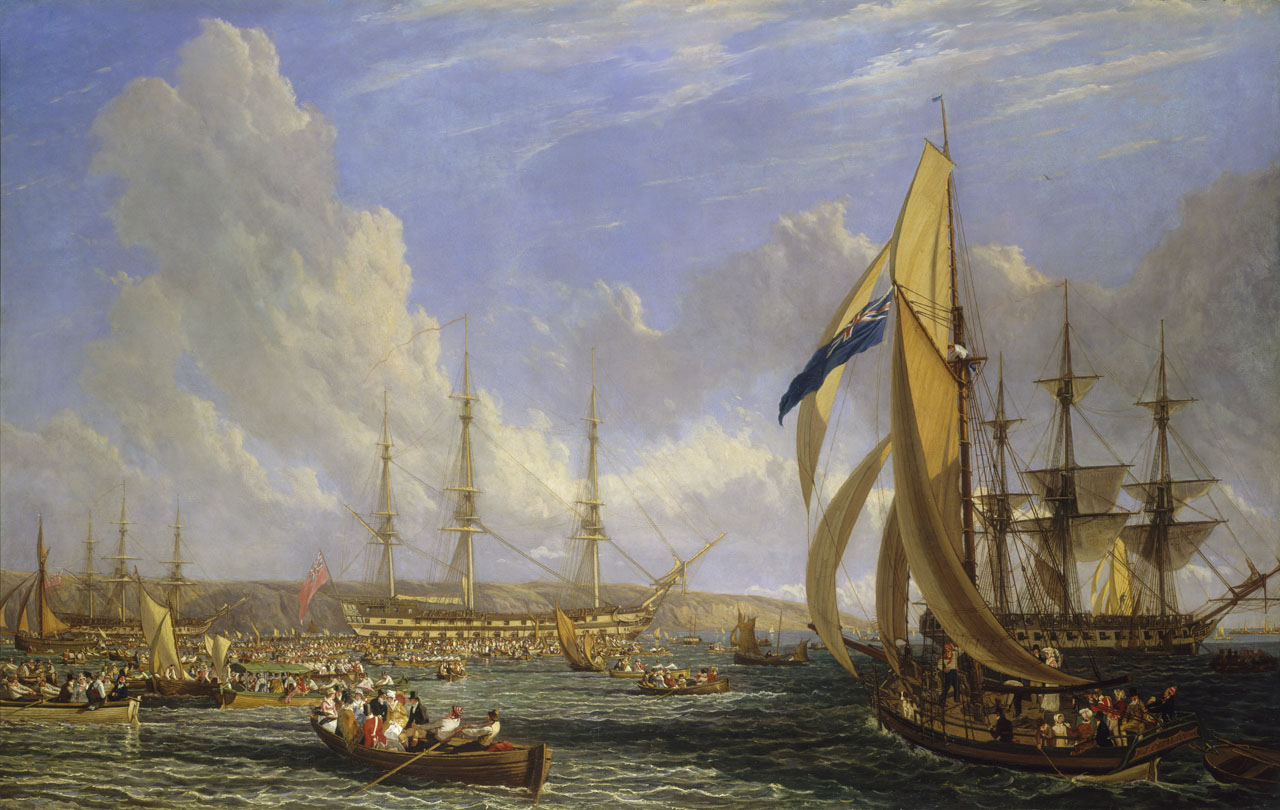
Bellerophon in Plymouth Sound in August 1815 surrounded by onlookers

Bellerophon anchored off Brixham on the morning of 24 July, and there Maitland received orders from Admiral Lord Keith to "prevent every person whatever from coming on board the ship you command, except the officers and men who compose her crew." Despite turning away the shore boats which approached the anchored warship bringing fresh bread and fruit to sell, word eventually leaked out that Napoleon was aboard the ship. The news created a sensation, and large numbers of boats filled with sightseers soon surrounded the ship. Occasionally Napoleon would come out to look at them, but despite entreaties from some people to be allowed on board, Maitland refused to allow any contact between ship and shore. On 26 July Bellerophon received orders to proceed to Plymouth harbour where Lord Keith was anchored aboard his flagship HMS Ville de Paris. Napoleon remained on board Bellerophon and the ship was kept isolated from the throngs of curious sightseers by two guardships, HMS Liffey and HMS Eurotas, anchored close at hand.

Bellerophon spent two weeks in Plymouth harbour while the authorities came to a decision about what to do with Napoleon. On 31 July they communicated their decision to the former emperor. Napoleon was to be exiled to the remote island of Saint Helena. He would be allowed to take three officers, his surgeon, and twelve servants. Napoleon, who had hoped to be allowed to settle quietly in Britain, was bitterly disappointed by the news. Bellerophon was not to take him into exile. The Admiralty was concerned that the ageing ship was unsuitable for the long voyage to the South Atlantic, and the 74-gun HMS Northumberland was selected for the task. On 4 August, Lord Keith ordered Bellerophon to go to sea and await the arrival of HMS Northumberland. On 7 August Napoleon thanked Maitland and his crew for their kindness and hospitality, and left Bellerophon, where he had spent over three weeks without ever landing in England. He boarded Northumberland, which then sailed for Saint Helena.

Captain Maitland's account of the time Napoleon spent on board his ship was published in 1826.

== Prison hulk and disposal ==
Having discharged Napoleon, Bellerophon sailed to Sheerness, and anchored there on 2 September. There she was paid off for the last time, and stripped of her guns and masts. With no further need for many ships following the end of the Napoleonic Wars, Bellerophon joined a number of ships laid up in this manner. A report on 16 October 1815 advised moving a number of convicts previously housed aboard the former HMS Portland into more suitable accommodation. The report suggested that "The class of ship, which I take the liberty of observing as most suitable for this service, would be a seventy-four, of about the same dimensions as Bellerophon in the river Medway, being of easy draft of water and lofty between decks." The report was approved and the suggestion acted upon. Bellerophon was taken into Sheerness Dockyard in December 1815 and spent nine months fitting out as a prison ship.

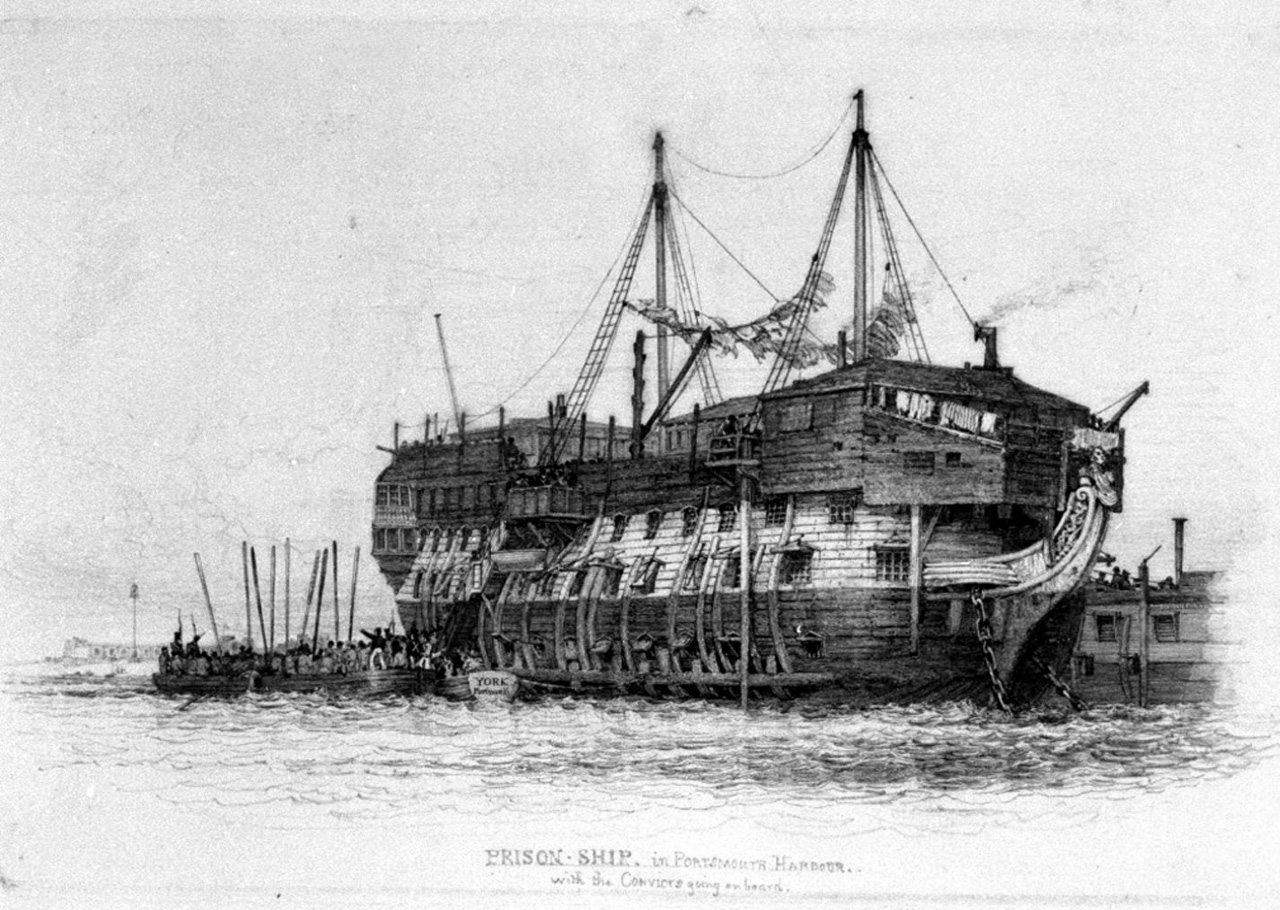
1829 engraving of HMS York as a prison ship in Portsmouth Harbour; Bellerophon would have been similarly equipped during her time as a prison ship.

The work was completed at a cost of £12,081 and the prisoners were transferred in January 1817. Bellerophon generally held around 435 prisoners during her time in this role, although in 1823 changes in legislation resulted in the adult prisoners being transferred out of Bellerophon and the ship instead being used to house boy prisoners, with 320 arriving in early 1824. In 1824 the decision was taken to rename HMS Waterloo, an 80-gun ship launched in 1818, HMS Bellerophon. To free the name, the former HMS Bellerophon was renamed Captivity on 5 October 1824. On 23 November 1824 she was driven ashore in a storm at Portsmouth.

Captivity continued as a prison ship for boys until early 1826, when it was decided that the arrangement of the internal spaces made her unsuitable for workshops. The boys were transferred to another hulk, the former HMS Euryalus, and it was decided to move Captivity to Plymouth. The ship was taken into Sheerness Dockyard in April 1826, and was fitted out for the journey to Plymouth. She arrived there in June and spent the last eight years of her working existence as a convict hulk in Plymouth. By 1834 the rate of penal transportation had been drastically increased to clear out the old hulks. When the last convicts had left Captivity, she was handed back to the Navy Department, who put her up for sale.

The Board of Admiralty announced that Captivity would be offered for sale on 21 January 1836; she was described as being 1613 tons and lying at Plymouth. The hulk was sold on that day for £4,030 (equivalent to £398,000 in 2025). She was broken up for scrap, and her timber was sold by auction in September 1836.

== Legacy ==
Some of Bellerophon's timber was bought at auction by George Bellamy, who had been Bellerophon's surgeon at the Nile. Bellamy incorporated them into a cottage he was building at Plymstock. It is now a Grade II listed building. Captain Maitland bought part of her figurehead and some of her stern ornaments, later depositing them in the collections of what eventually became the Royal Naval Museum. The National Maritime Museum holds several relics relating to Bellerophon and the people connected with her, including Captain John Cooke's dirk, sword and pistol, and a trophy presented to Admiral Pasley by Lloyd's of London. Their collections also contain artefacts relating to her connection with Napoleon, including the couch from Maitland's cabin, and the skull of a goat which supplied milk for Napoleon and his suite.

=== Bellerophon in art, music and literature ===
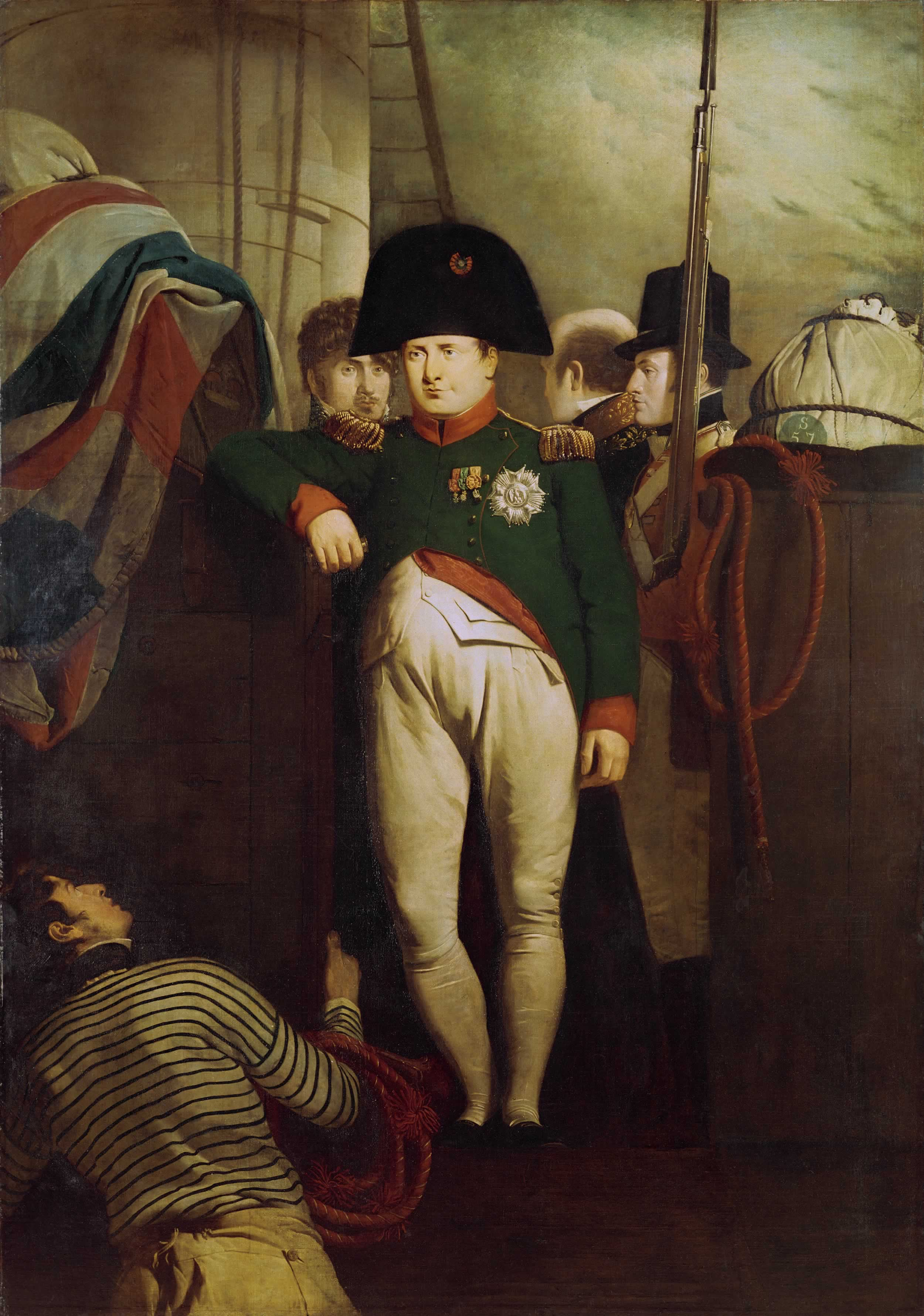
Napoleon on the Bellerophon (Charles Lock Eastlake, 1815)

The ship and her crew feature, or are mentioned, in several historical novels set during the French Revolutionary and Napoleonic Wars, including several of the Aubrey–Maturin series of novels by Patrick O'Brian, and the novel Sharpe's Trafalgar by Bernard Cornwell.

Bellerophon appears in a number of artworks, including several depicting the ship's role in Napoleon's surrender. Sir William Quiller Orchardson painted Napoleon on the Bellerophon, depicting the former emperor standing on the poop deck, watching the French coastline recede as his retinue look on. Sir Charles Lock Eastlake painted a portrait of Napoleon in uniform, standing on Bellerophon's deck, while John James Chalon produced Scene in Plymouth Sound in August 1815, a seascape, with Bellerophon surrounded by crowds of people in small boats. Thomas Luny painted a similar scene, showing Bellerophon putting into Torbay to rendezvous with HMS Northumberland. Numerous popular prints and engravings were also produced, depicting moments from Napoleon's arrival on Bellerophon to surrender, to his final transfer to Northumberland for his voyage into exile. The ship also appears in prints and paintings of the battles she had fought in. She is depicted on the Cádiz blockade with the rest of the inshore squadron in a work by Thomas Buttersworth, and is visible at the Glorious First of June in works by Nicholas Pocock, Cornwallis's Retreat by William Anderson, and the Battles of the Nile and Trafalgar by Thomas Whitcombe.

Bellerophon is mentioned in several verses in a song commemorating Cornwallis's Retreat in 1795, which celebrate both Cornwallis (referred to by sailors' popular nickname for him, "Billy Blue"), and Bellerophon's fighting record at the Glorious First of June.^{[i]} The folk song "Boney was a Warrior", about the life of Napoleon, includes a verse celebrating the ship's links with his ultimate surrender:

Boney went a-cruisin'
Way-aye-yah!
Aboard the Billy Ruffian
Johnny Franswor!

== Notes ==
a. This revived design is sometimes referred to as the Edgar class.

b. Greaves had originally approached the Navy Board in December 1781 with a proposal to build a 64-gun ship at his yard at Limehouse, and a 74-gun ship and a frigate at Frindsbury. The Board turned him down, feeling that the Limehouse yard was unsuitable for building anything larger than a 44-gun ship, and that the Frindsbury yard was too close to the Navy's own shipbuilding facilities at Chatham. Commercial yards paid higher wages than the Navy's yards and the Board was concerned skilled workmen would be poached from Chatham. Greaves promised not to employ men from the Chatham yard, and the Board decided to offer him the contract for a 74-gun ship on 8 January 1782. Greaves signed the contract on 19 February 1782.

c. To build and fit Bellerophon for service required 2,000 trees (amounting to 50 acres), 100 tons of iron bolts, 30 tons of copper bolts, 30,000 treenails, 4,000 copper sheets, 12 tons of tar, 400 gallons of linseed oil, 5 tons of paint, 10,000 square yards of canvas, 80 tons of shot, 20 tons of gunpowder, 200 tons of provisions and 260 tons of fresh water.

d. Sources agree that four men were killed, but while Winfield and Goodwin report twenty-seven wounded, Cordingly has the slightly higher figure of thirty wounded.

e. Darby may have intended to anchor alongside the 80-gun Franklin, the ship immediately ahead of Orient, or to have tacked alongside the gap between Franklin and Orient, so as to be able to rake Orient's bows. Cordingly considers that the reason for the ultimate positioning was never explained. Adkin prefers the explanation that Darby intended to rake Orient's bows, but the anchor had dragged.

f. This was among the highest casualty figures of any of the British ships. Only the 50 dead and 143 wounded of HMS Majestic was comparable. Bellerophon's total casualty list of 197 was slightly higher than Majestic's 193, and amounted to nearly a quarter of the total British casualties in the battle. Robert Cathcart, as the senior surviving lieutenant, was recommended for promotion by Earl St Vincent, a recommendation the Admiralty accepted, advancing him to commander.

g. Cumby shared in the rewards after Trafalgar. He was promoted twice in rapid succession, to commander on 24 December 1805, and to post-captain on 1 January 1806.

h. Napoleon wrote a letter in the evening of 13 July, addressed to the Prince of Wales, prince regent during the illness of his father, King George III,

Your Royal Highness,
A victim to the factions which distract my country, and to the enmity of the greatest powers of Europe, I have terminated my political career, and I come, like Themistocles, to throw myself upon the hospitality of the British people. I put myself under the protection of their laws; which I claim from your Royal Highness, as the most powerful, the most constant, and the most generous of my enemies.
Rochefort 13 July 1815
Napoleon

i. A partial excerpt is

We'd the Triumph and the Mars,
And the Sov'ren – pride of tars,
Billy Ruff'n, and the Brunswick, known to fame
...
No I don't care a rap,
For any Frenchy chap,
When they come they'll get the dressing they deserve;
I've the best four in the fleet,
That the French well could meet,
With the Fightin' Billy Ruff'n in reserve.
Billy Blue –
Here's to you, Billy Blue, here's to you!

As she broke the line with Howe,
So she's game to do it now,
And repeat her 'First o' June' here in these seas;
With their name for dauntless pluck,
and the Billy Ruff'n's luck,
I will fight as many Frenchmen as you please!
Billy Blue –
Here's to you, Billy Blue, here's to you!
