= Lawrence Norfolk =

British novelist (born 1963)

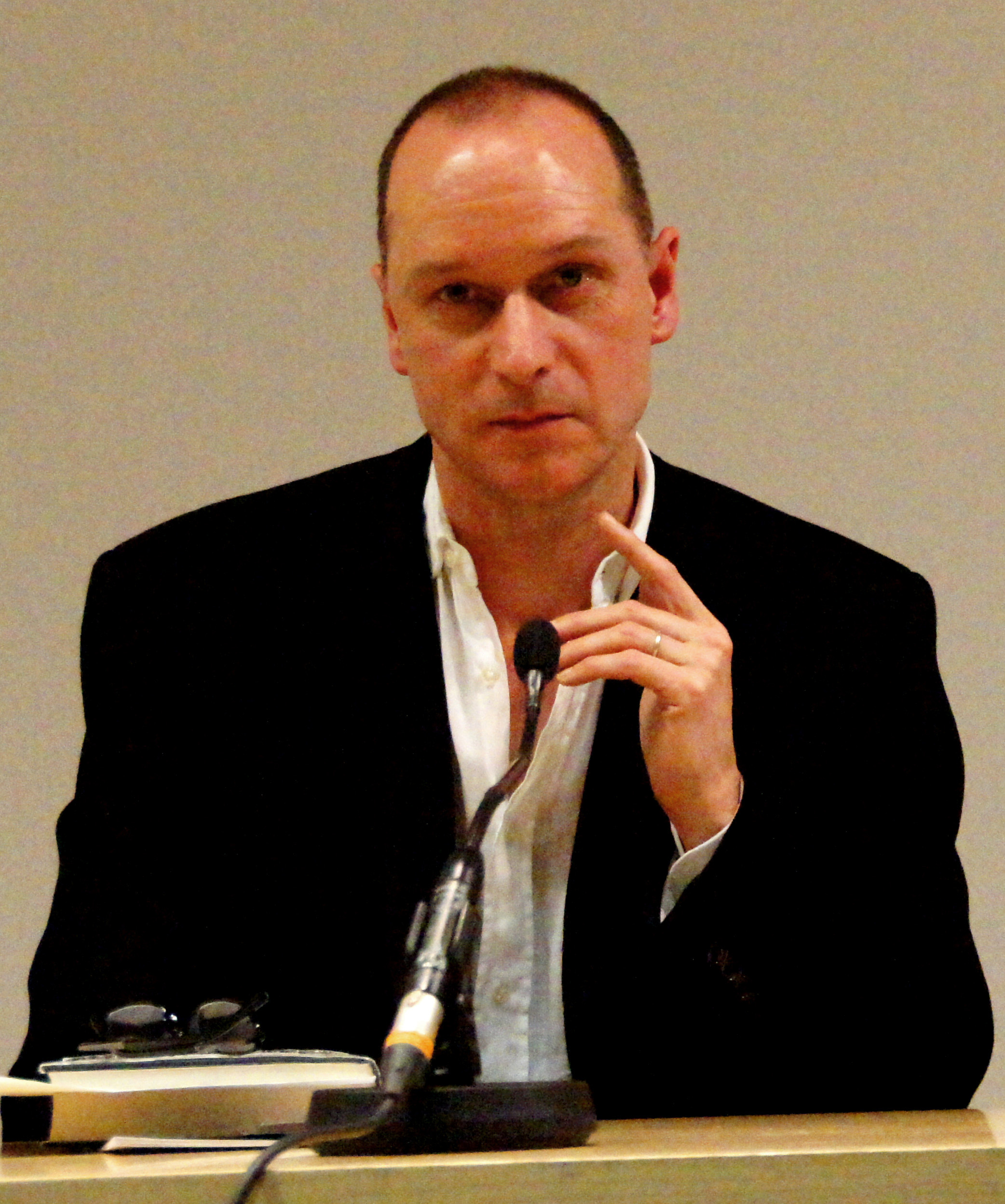
Norfolk in 2013

Lawrence Norfolk (born 1963) is a British novelist known for historical works with complex plots and intricate detail.

== Biography ==
Though born in London, Norfolk lived in Iraq until 1967 and then in the West Country of England. He read English at King's College London and graduated in 1986. He worked briefly as a teacher and later as a freelance writer for reference book publishers.

In 1992 he won the Somerset Maugham Award for his first novel, Lemprière's Dictionary, about events surrounding the publication, in 1788, of John Lemprière's Bibliotheca Classica on classical mythology and history. The novel starts out as a detective story and mixes historical elements with steampunk-style fiction. It imagines the writing of Lemprière's dictionary as tied to the founding of the British East India Company and the Siege of La Rochelle generations before; it also visits the Austro-Turkish War.

Norfolk based his second novel, The Pope's Rhinoceros, on the story of an actual animal; see Dürer's Rhinoceros. Themes in the work include the lost city of Vineta in the Baltic, the sack of Prato, and the Benin bronze-making culture on the river Niger.

The third novel, In the Shape of a Boar, juxtaposes the flight of a Bukovina Jew in World War II with the legend of Atalanta in Calydon.

== Literary works ==
- Lemprière's Dictionary (1991)
- The Pope's Rhinoceros (1996)
- In the Shape of a Boar (2000)
- John Saturnall's Feast (2012)
