= John Lemprière =

English classical scholar, lexicographer and theologian (c.1765–1824)

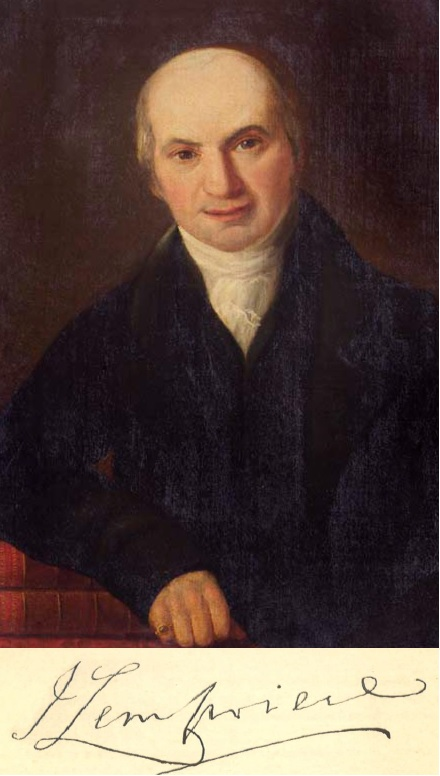
- Lemprière engraving & signature
- Born: c. 1765; Jersey
- Died: 1 February 1824; London
- Spouses: Lucy Willance, Elizabeth Deane, Ann Collingwood
- Children: Francis Drocus, Everard, Caroline
- Parents: Charles Lemprière (father); Susan Collas (mother)

John Lemprière (c. 1765 in Jersey – 1 February 1824 in London) was an English classical scholar, lexicographer, theologian, teacher and headmaster.

== Life ==
John Lemprière was the son of Charles Lemprière (died 1801), of Mont au Prêtre, Jersey.

He received his early education at Winchester College, where his father sent him in 1779, and from 1785 at Pembroke College, Oxford, probably on the advice of Richard Valpy, graduating BA in 1790, MA in 1792, BD in 1801, and DD in 1803.

Lemprière may have been influenced by another Pembroke man, the lexicographer Dr Samuel Johnson, whose famous A Dictionary of the English Language had appeared in 1755. A little over thirty years later, around 1786, Lemprière started work on his own Classical dictionary.

In 1787, he was invited by Valpy to be assistant headmaster at Reading Grammar School, and in 1789, to the great pride of his father, he preached in St Helier, Jersey. He achieved renown for his Bibliotheca Classica or Classical Dictionary containing a full Account of all the Proper Names mentioned in Ancient Authors (Reading, November 1788), which, edited by various later scholars, long remained a readable if not absolutely trustworthy reference book in mythology and classical history. Lemprière wished "to give the most accurate and satisfactory account of all the proper names which occur in reading the Classics, and by a judicious collection of anecdotes and historical facts to draw a picture of ancient times, not less instructive than entertaining." (Lemprière, Preface, 1788). It has been a handbook for teachers, journalists, dramatists and poets for almost two hundred years and John Keats is said to have known the book almost by heart. "Far from being just an ordinary dictionary, however, Lemprière's encyclopedic work is full of incidental details and stories which bring the mythical past to life." It is assumed that the great scholar Valpy helped Lemprière with the dictionary.

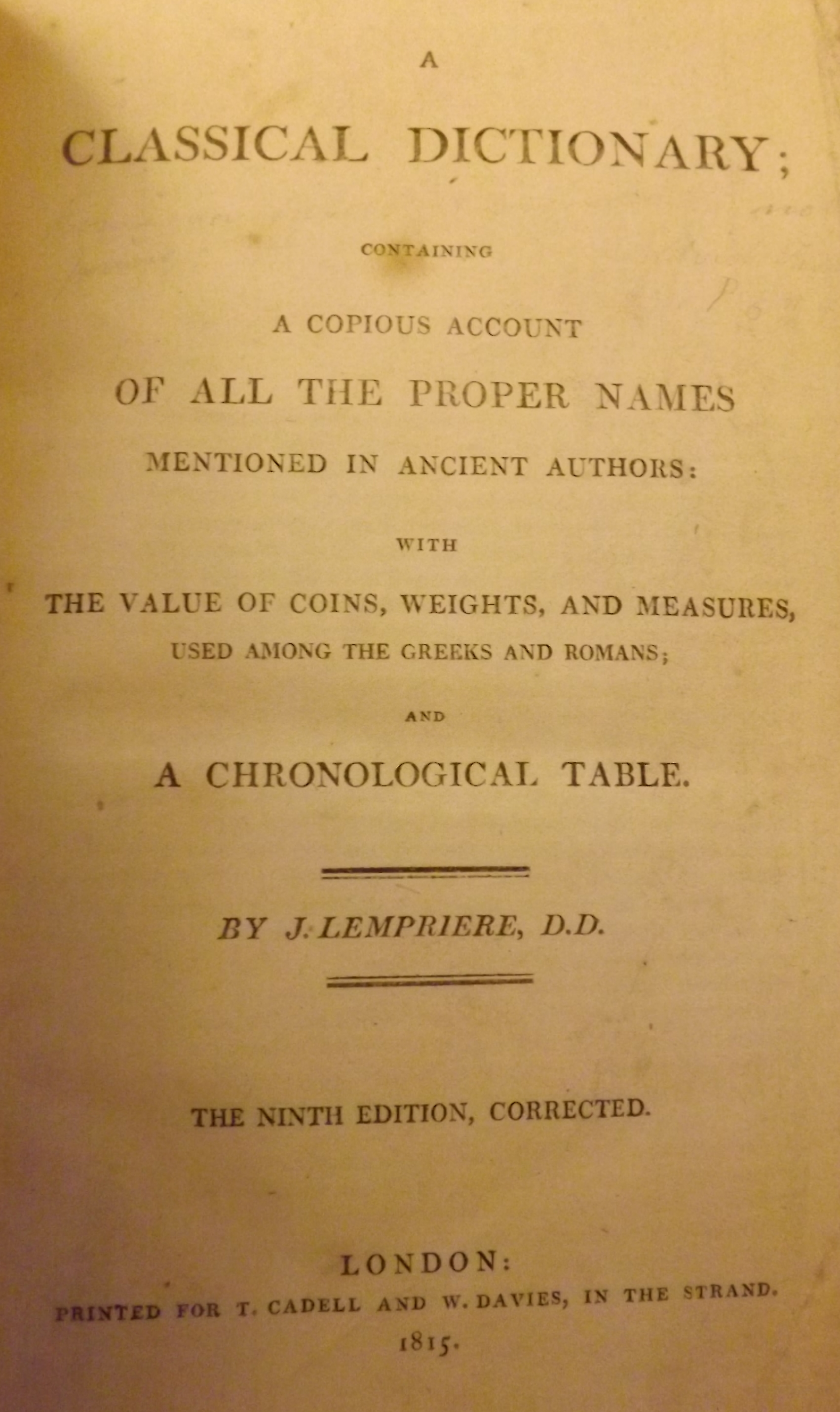
Classical Dictionary. Frontispiece to the 1815 edition

Lemprière held a schoolmaster's post at Bolton Grammar School in 1791 and was a curate at Radley, Oxfordshire.

From 6 August 1792 until his resignation in midsummer 1809, he was headmaster of Abingdon Grammar School, and in 1800 was also appointed as vicar of that parish, serving until 1811. While occupying these two posts, he published a Universal Biography of Eminent Persons in all Ages and Countries (London, 1808).

His time at Abingdon School has been recorded as being a period of negligence on his part, which resulted in a decline of the School during the period. Numbers at the School began to decline in 1795 and the number of scholars (Charity boys) never exceeded two and there were only some six or so boarders. He failed to make use of the Bennett's endowment as a route towards Pembroke College and excluded the town boys from mixing with his boarders out of hours. He also failed to repair any of the School buildings. On 20 July 1798, the Borough records show that George Knapp (the Mayor of Abingdon-on-Thames and a former Abingdon School pupil) headed a committee to confer with Lemprière regarding the Roysse's Ordinances. Lemprière has been the subject of complaints stating he had been negligent in his duties at the School and at St Nicolas' Church. In 1799 he was deprived of his benefice and was persuaded to resign from the school in 1809.

In 1809 he succeeded to the headmastership of Exeter Free Grammar School and held this post until 1819. On retiring from this school, following a disagreement with the trustees, he received the living of Meeth in Devon, which, together with that of Newton St Petrock, he held until his death from a stroke in the Strand, London. He is buried in Meeth, where his grave can be found.

Two of his sons were also rectors of Meeth: Francis Drocus Lemprière (born 1794) and Everard Lemprière (born 1800). His daughter Caroline, who died at the age of twenty-seven, was the first wife of John Bathurst Deane.

== Publications ==
- "Bibliotheca Classica" or "Classical Dictionary containing a full Account of all the Proper Names mentioned in Ancient Authors", (Reading,1788)
- "Sermon preché dans le Temple de la Paroisse de St. Helier, à Jersey, le deuxième d'Août." (1789)
- "A Sermon preached at the opening of St. Peter's Chapel, Swinton, in the parish of Eccles, Lancashire, on Sunday, April 10, 1791."
- "Herodotus" (a translation, Book 1 only), (1792) (References in: The Histories by Herodotus. G. C. Macaulay (1890) Reprint: Barnes and Noble, 2004)
- "Universal Biography of Eminent Persons in all Ages and Countries", (London, 1808)

=== Posthumous publications ===
- Bibliotheca classica: or, A classical dictionary: containing a copious account of the principal proper names mentioned in ancient authors; with the value of coins, weights, and measures, used among the Greeks and Romans; and a chronological table, Volume 2 (1833)
- A classical dictionary, available in Project Gutenberg, published in United Kingdom by George Routledge and Sons in 1904.

== Lemprière in fiction ==
The 1991 prize-winning novel Lemprière's Dictionary by Lawrence Norfolk has as its background Lemprière's writing of his dictionary, as well as the places the Lemprière family came from. The main character is John Lemprière, author of the Classical Dictionary, and also his father, Charles Lemprière. The rest of the story is fiction.

The poet Tony Harrison refers to Lemprière as the source of Keats's classical knowledge in his poem "A Kumquat for John Keats" in the line "Flora asphyxiated by foul air / unknown to Keats or Lemprière."

The character Mr. Scogan expresses his admiration for Lemprière's work as a biographer and lexicographer in Aldous Huxley's novel Crome Yellow (ch. XIV).

In George Orwell's Keep The Aspidistra Flying there is "You'll find it in Lempriere", a snark remark made by protagonist at Rosemary.

In Gilbert and Sullivan's first joint operetta Thespis there are several references to Lempriere when the cast are arguing about their rightful positions in ancient Greek mythology.

In Virginia Woolf's Between The Acts, there is a reference to Lempriere to help find the origin of "Touch wood."

== See also ==
- Bibliotheca Classica
- HMS Bellerophon (1786)
- Lawrence Norfolk

== Sources ==
- A Dictionary of Universal Biography of All Ages and of All Peoples, Albert M. Hyamson, 1916.
- Pedigree of Lemprière, of S. Trinity
