= HMS Flying Fish (1806) =

History

United Kingdom
- Name: Revenge
- Acquired: 1806 by purchase
- Renamed: HMS Flying Fish
- Fate: Wrecked 15 December 1808

General characteristics
- Type: Schooner
- Tons burthen: 151 (bm)
- Propulsion: Sails
- Sail plan: Schooner
- Armament: 12 guns

HMS Flying Fish was the schooner Revenge, purchased in the West Indies in 1806 for the Royal Navy. She participated in a notable cutting out expedition and in 1807 in the second of the British invasions of the Río de la Plata; she was wrecked in 1808.

== Origins ==
Flying Fish was purchased in the West Indies and no record of the vessel or the transaction reached the Admiralty in London. Unusually, the acquirers gave her the same name as that of another vessel in the area, HMS Flying Fish (1803). The pre-existing Flying Fish received a name change to Firefly in 1807, but was wrecked that same year. The new Flying Fish may have been commissioned under Lieutenant H.G. Massie, but if so, command quickly transferred to Lieutenant James Glassford Gooding.

== Service ==
Admiral James R. Dacres, commander-in-chief of the Jamaica station, formed a small squadron on 25 August 1806 under the command of Captain George Le Geyt of the 18-gun Stork. The other three vessels in the squadron were Flying Fish under Gooding, Superieure (1803), and the 4-gun schooner Pike. Dacres ordered Le Geyt to bring out or destroy privateers based at Batabano in Cuba.

On 30 August the squadron approached the Isle of Pines. There they sighted a Spanish schooner at anchor. Le Geyt reinforced Pike with a lieutenant and eight seamen and sent her to engage the Spanish vessel. After a short chase and two broadsides from Pike's 12-pounder carronades, the Spaniard surrendered. She turned out to be a guarda costa of 10 guns, with a crew of 45 men. Pike took possession of her and took her back to the squadron.

Le Geyt then discovered that Stork drew too much water to permit her to enter the Gulf of Batabanó. He therefore transferred to the other three vessels his boats and men and sent in the cutting-out expedition under the command of Lieutenant Edward Rushworth, captain of Superieure.

The landing party consisted of 63 officers and men. Ten men from Flying Fish remained to guard the party's boats. The party landed on 2 September and crossed some two miles of marshy ground to storm a fort at Batabano. On their way they had to break through an ambush of enemy soldiers and militia. In the process they killed two and wounded one badly. At the fort they captured six 18-pounder long guns, which they spiked. The party then proceeded to take possession of the vessels in the bay. There is some disagreement as to how many vessels they captured and took as prizes, with the total rising as high as 12. According to Rushworth's letter (an after action report), the prizes included a felucca, pierced for 14 guns but only mounting one 18-pounder, a schooner pierced for 12 guns, a French 4-gun privateer, and three Spanish privateers of one gun each. The party also burnt at least six smaller coasting vessels after having removed their cargoes. Total British casualties amounted to one man badly wounded. A later accounting reported that in all cases the crews of the captured vessels escaped.

Flying Fish was at Spithead on 7 November 1806 when Admiral George Murray took command of the naval forces involved in the operations to capture Buenos Aires, supporting General John Whitelocke's soldiers. Murray and the naval forces were for the most part limited to conveying troops, and subsequently organising their evacuation. The Spanish colonists, though discontented with Spanish rule, were not disposed to accept British rule. They rose against the soldiers who landed, and took them prisoners.

By 24 November Flying Fish and the rest of the naval force were at Saint Helena. From there they traveled to Table Bay, Cape of Good Hope, from where Murry wrote that the fleet was very healthy and that he had had to send only one man to hospital, a seaman from Flying Fish, for a fracture. The fleet left the Cape on 6 April, but on 8 April Flying Fish sailed back to Saint Helena with dispatches for onward transfer to Britain. By 27 May she had rejoined the fleet, now at Montevideo, and from then on she was employed in liaison duty, reconnaissance, and transporting senior commanders in support of the operation. By 8 July Flying Fish was with the squadron off Buenos Aires. Around 10 September Flying Fish sailed with the fleet back to Britain.

On 16 April 1808 Flying Fish sailed for Jamaica. She reached Barbados on 10 July with dispatches from Cadiz.

== Fate ==
In December 1808 Flying Fish was sailing along the coast of San Domingo, working her way towards Port Royal, Jamaica, with a schooner in tow, a prize that she had taken. As the weather worsened, Gooding sailed closer to shore. When breakers were sighted ahead, he attempted to turn Flying Fish, but was unable to do so before she grounded. Although the strike was gentle, water poured in and Flying Fish was quickly turned on her side. The prize came in and removed all the men on Flying Fish. The subsequent court martial reprimanded the master for failing to take frequent depth soundings as the vessels approached shore, and admonished Gooding not to sail so close to shore in the future.
