= HMS Superieure =

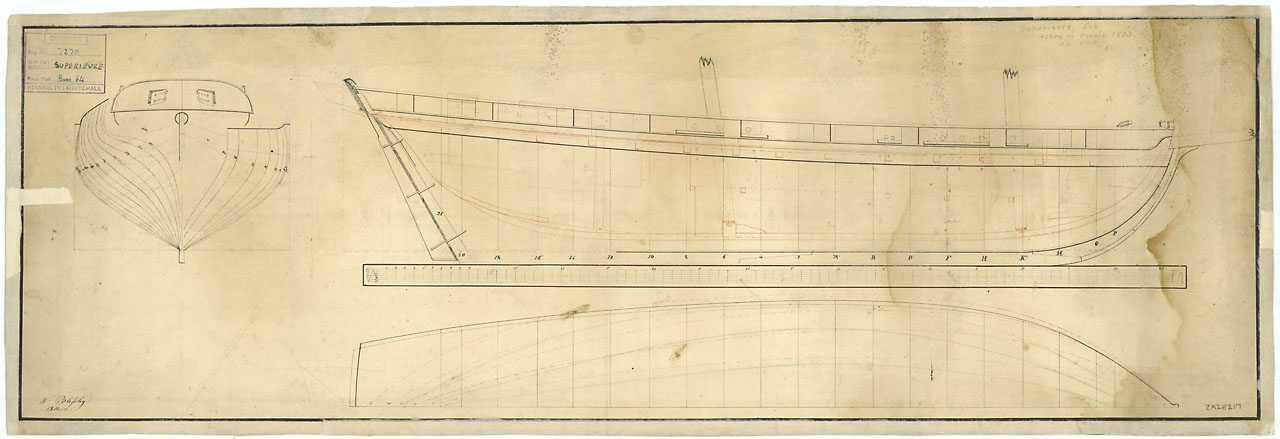
- Lines of Superieure, from the National Maritime Museum, Greewich

History

France
- Name: Superior
- Launched: 1801
- Acquired: By purchase
- Renamed: Supérieure on purchase
- Captured: 2 July 1803

United Kingdom
- Name: HMS Superieure
- Acquired: 2 July 1803 (by capture)
- Honours and awards: Naval General Service Medal (NGSM) with clasps; "Martinique"; "Superieure 10 Feby. 1809"; "Guadaloupe"
- Fate: Sold 1814

General characteristics
- Type: Schooner
- Tons burthen: 197 (bm)
- Length: 86 ft 4 in (26.3 m) (overall); 67 ft 0 in (20.4 m) (keel)
- Beam: 23 ft 6 in (7.2 m)
- Depth of hold: 9 ft 5 in (2.9 m)
- Propulsion: Sails
- Sail plan: Schooner
- Complement: 70
- Armament: Initial British service: 8 × 18-pounder carronades + 2 × 12-pounder bow chasers; Later: 12 × 4-pounder guns (by 1810)

HMS Superieure was the French privateer Supérieure, which was built in 1801 in Baltimore, Maryland, and which the British captured in 1803 in the West Indies, and took into the Royal Navy. She spent most of her career on the Jamaica and Leeward Islands stations, where she captured numerous privateers. She participated in several notable single-ship actions, including one in which she harassed a frigate, and two campaigns that would, in 1847, earn her surviving crew members the Naval General Service Medal (NGSM). She was laid-up in Britain in 1810 and sold in 1814.

== Origins ==
Supérieure was launched in Talbot County, Maryland, as Superior. Her owners, Robert Charles Boislandry and Felix Imbert, received a temporary registration at the Baltimore Customs House on 7 January 1801. Notations on the record report that Superior was sold to the French navy while she was anchored at Saint Barthélemy.

== Capture ==
On 2 July 1803, the squadron under Captain Henry William Bayntun captured Supérieure and Poisson Volant. The actual captor of Supérieure was Vanguard.

The Royal Navy purchased Supérieure on 15 October, and then commissioned her soon after under Lieutenant Edward Crofton. Cumberland, Hercule, Bellerophon, Elephant, and Vanguard all shared in the bounty money for her capture.

== British career ==
Lieutenant William C. Fromow replaced Crofton almost immediately. Fromow was in command on 6 February 1804 when Superieure captured the French privateer schooner Serpent after a chase of two hours. Serpent, of 60 tons (bm), was armed with one gun, had a crew of 60 men, and was sailing in ballast. Head money for the crew of Serpent was finally paid in September 1827.

On 28 February, Superieure recaptured the British sloop Phoenix, sailing from Bermuda. Before 9 March, Superieure also destroyed the barge Mardigras, which was armed with two guns and had a crew of 24 "White Men", who were sent to Jamaica.

Fromow and Superieure captured another French privateer a little over a year later, on 22 October 1804. They encountered a French vessel, which they had to chase for four hours, exchanging fire as they went, before they succeeded in capturing her near Monto Christ. Their quarry was the privateer Chasseur, of five guns and 66 men. She was pilot-boat built and had recently undergone a refit at "Jago" and was "one of the fastest sailing Cruizers out of Guadaloupe". During the chase Chasseur fired a 12-pounder gun at her pursuers, causing some damage to the rigging and sails on Superiuere. Return fire wounded five men on Chasseur, of whom one died shortly after her capture. Chasseur had been out only three days and had not captured anything. Head money was paid in December 1828. (Note: A first-class share was worth £102 14s 11¼d; a fifth-class share, that of a seaman, was worth £1 2s 9¾d.)

Superieure and Fortunee captured the Globe on 18 May 1805. A nine-hour chase on 24 July resulted in Superieure capturing the Spanish privateer felucca Santa Maria Magdalena (alias Son Sorito). She was armed with one gun and small arms, and had a crew of 30 men under the command of Antonio Amet. She had been out twenty days but had only taken a drogger. Still, Admiral James R. Dacres, commander-in-chief of the Jamaica station, described Santa Maria Magdalena as having "much annoyed the Trade of the Island of Jamaica."

At some point in 1806 Lieutenant John Balderston replaced Fromow, only to be replaced in turn by Lieutenant Edward Rushworth. Between 1 January 1806 and 1 January 1807, Superieure, captured two Spanish gunboats, each armed with one 32-pounder gun, one having a crew of 40 men and the other a crew of 45 men.

On 5 July, Hercule, Surveillante, Fortunee, Echo, and Superieure shared in the capture of the Spanish ship Josepha. Her cargo included 362 "cajes" of quicksilver.

On 25 August Dacres 1806 formed a small squadron under the command of Captain George Le Geyt of the 18-gun Stork. The other three vessels in the squadron were Superieure, the 10 or 12-gun schooner Flying Fish, and the 4-gun schooner Pike. Dacres ordered Le Geyt to bring out or destroy privateers based at Batabano in Cuba.

On 30 August the squadron approached the Isle of Pines. There they sighted a Spanish schooner at anchor. Le Geyt reinforced Pike with a lieutenant and eight seamen and sent her to engage the Spanish vessel. After a short chase and two broadsides from Pike's 12-pounder carronades, the Spaniard surrendered. She turned out to be a guarda costa of 10 guns, with a crew of 45 men. Pike took possession of her and took her back to the squadron.

Le Geyt then discovered that Stork drew too much water to permit her to enter the Gulf of Batabanó. He therefore transferred to the other three vessels his boats and men and sent in the cutting-out expedition under the command of Rushworth of Superieure.

The landing party consisted of 63 officers and men. Ten men from Flying Fish remained to guard the party's boats. The party landed on 2 September and crossed some two miles of marshy ground to storm a fort at Batabano. On their way they had to break through an ambush of enemy soldiers and militia. In the process they killed two and wounded one badly. At the fort they captured six 18-pounder long guns, which they spiked. The party then proceeded to take possession of the vessels in the bay. There is some disagreement as to how many vessels they captured and took as prizes, with the total rising as high as 12. According to Rushworth's letter (an after action report), the prizes included a felucca, pierced for 14 guns but only mounting one 18-pounder, a schooner pierced for 12 guns, a French 4-gun privateer, and three Spanish privateers of one gun each. The party also burnt at least six smaller coasting vessels after having removed their cargoes. Total British casualties amounted to one man badly wounded. A later accounting reported that in all cases the crews of the captured vessels escaped. Two days later Superieure captured the Spanish armed schooner San Juan, of three guns and 320 men, after a slight resistance.

Superieure then sailed to Britain, where she underwent refitting at Plymouth between 16 March and 2 April 1807. Lieutenant John Buller recommissioned her and on 16 April sailed her for the Leeward Islands.

On 17 October 1807 Superieure encountered the French schooner privateer Jopo L'Oeil (or Tap a l'Oeil) about 120 leagues east of Barbados. The sanguinary engagement between the two vessels lasted an hour and a quarter, with Buller being killed instantly by a musket ball to the head while attempting to board the privateer early in the fight. Lieutenant John G. Bird took command and continued the fight until the privateer surrendered. She had a crew of 95 men. She was pierced for 14 guns but carried only six 18-pounders plus another one on a traveling carriage. She was 32 days out of Pointe-à-Pitre Guadeloupe and had made no captures. Bird described Jopo L'Oeil as "a remarkable fine Vessel". In the fight the British lost four men killed, including Buller, and eight men wounded; the French lost five killed and 19 wounded. The brig Hawke was in sight during the engagement but was unable to close until after the fight was over. (Note: A first-class share of the prize money in 1815 for the Tape à l'Oeil was £100 5s 0½d; a fifth-class share was worth £1 10s 10d.) The British took the privateer into service as HMS Dominica. (Note: A first-class share of the prize money for the hull and stores was worth £74 17s 10½d; a fifth-class share was worth £1 3s 0½d.)

Lieutenant Andrew Hodge replaced Buller in October. At some point (acting) Lieutenant William Robilliard replaced Hodge; Robillard was in command on 22 April 1808. when Goree, under Commander Joseph Spear, engaged the French brigs Palinure and Pilade in an inconclusive action. Superieur, which had been anchored some miles away, came to Goree's assistance. The French brigs sailed away, with Superieure chasing them; Goree was too damaged in her masts and rigging to continue the engagement. At this point, Goree had lost one man killed and four wounded. Superieure and Pilade maintained a running fight until the French brigs reached the protection of shore batteries at the Saintes. Superieure then gave up the chase having sustained no casualties and little damage. The frigate Circe and the brig-sloop Wolverine then arrived, but too late to engage. Pilade had lost four men killed and six wounded, and Palinure had lost four men killed and 15 men wounded, among them her captain.

In late 1808 Superieure captured and brought into Barbados the French schooner Polly, bound to Bourdeaux from Martinique with a valuable cargo.

In January 1809 Lieutenant William Ferrie assumed command of Superieure. She then participated in the campaign that resulted in the invasion of Martinique in February. In 1847 the Admiralty issued the NGSM with clasp "Martinique" to any surviving claimants from the campaign.

On 8 February, Superieure and Asp were close to the Virgin Islands when they sighted the French frigate Junon, which had left the Saintes four days earlier. The British set off in pursuit, with Asp falling behind. Superieure, which reportedly had only four 18-pounder carronades mounted, fired some shots, which drew the attention of the British frigate Latona. The chase continued the next day and into a second night. However, on 10 February, the British frigate Horatio, and the brig Driver came on the scene and were able to intercept Junon. Junon was able to drive off Horatio, inflicting damage and casualties on her. Superieure was close by, and her fire caused enough damage to Junon's sails to prevent her escape. Eventually Latona arrived. Surrounded by Horatio, Latona, Driver, and Superieure, Junon surrendered. Although there were seven men killed aboard Horatio, and 32 wounded on Horatio, Latona, and Driver, Superieure sustained no casualties. The French lost 130 men killed and wounded, including the captain of Junon, who died the next day.

The British took Junon into service under her existing name. Junon was carrying some sugar and cargo, which resulted in prize money (over and above that for the vessel itself) for all five British captors (i.e., including Asp). In 1847, the Admiralty awarded the NGSM with clasps "Horatio 10 Feby. 1809" and "Superieure 10 Feby. 1809" to 13 surviving claimants from Horatio and one from Superieure. Then, Superieure was present at the capture of the Saintes in April. (Note: A first-class share of a distribution of prize money in April 1836 was worth 10s 2¾d. A sixth-class share, that of an ordinary seaman, was worth 1d. The seventh and eighth classes of shares were worth less than a farthing a piece and so were too small to pay.)

Lieutenant Humphrey Fleming Senhouse replaced Ferrie. Senhouse received a promotion to commander on 2 June 1809, and in turn was replaced by Lieutenant Henry Conyngham Coxen (or Coxon).

Coxen was promoted to commander on 10 October 1809, but remained in command of Superieure. Subsequently, Superieure, under Coxen, was also at the Invasion of Guadeloupe in February 1810. (Note: A first-class share of the prize money was worth £113 3s 1½d; a sixth-class share was worth £1 9s 5¼d.) In 1847, this campaign earned surviving claimants from her crew the clasp "Guadaloupe". Between 14 and 17 February, Superieure was at the invasion of Sint Maarten. After the island capitulated Superieure evacuated the inhabitants of the French Quarter.

Coxen's replacement was Lieutenant Robert Russel (acting).

== Fate ==
Superieure arrived at Deptford on 24 August; she then was laid-up in ordinary. The Admiralty put her up for sale on 16 March 1814, and she was sold on that day for £440 to John Small Sedger.
