= Bibliotheca Classica =

1788 reference book by John Lemprière

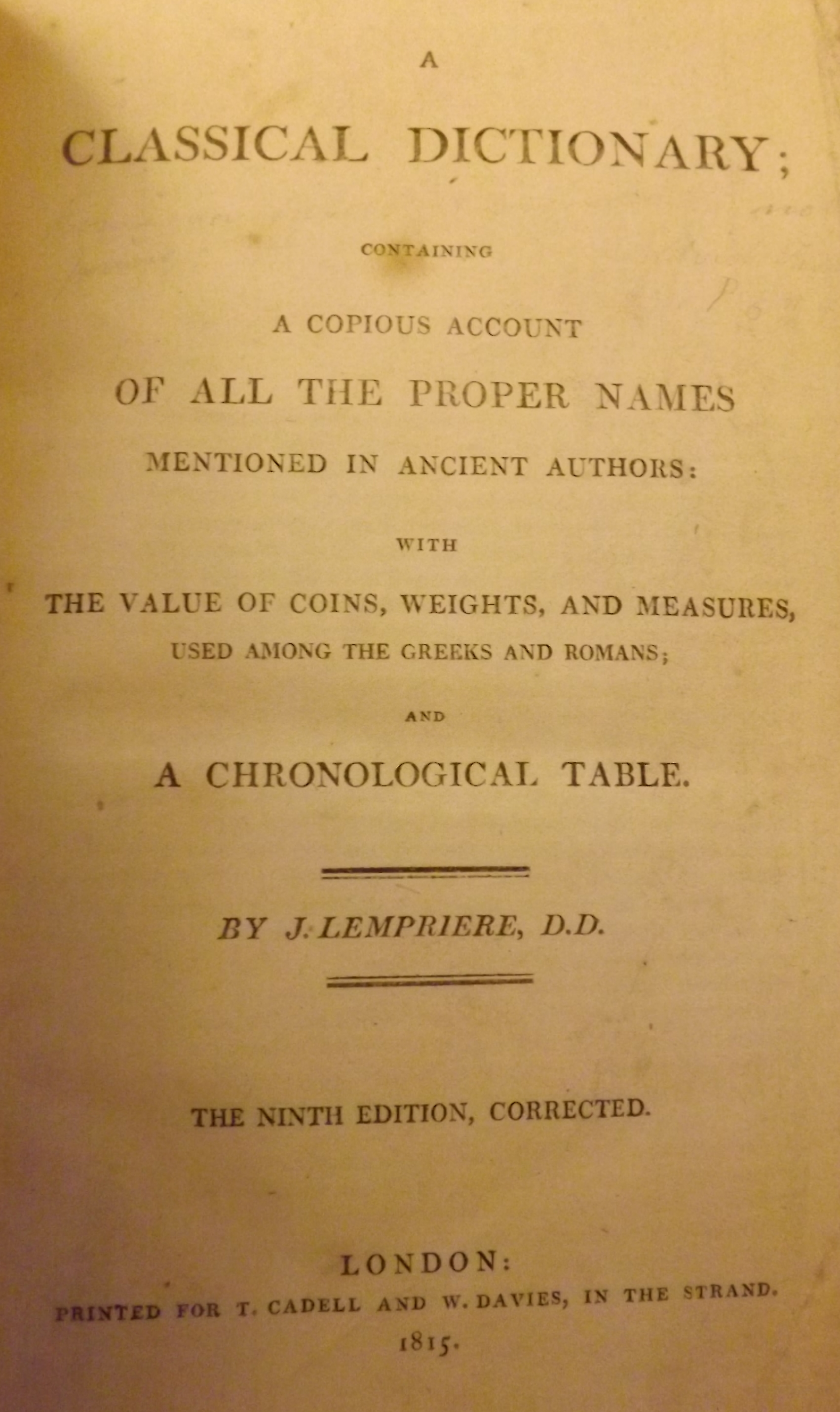
Frontispiece to the 1815 edition

The Bibliotheca Classica, or Classical Dictionary containing a full Account of all the Proper Names mentioned in Ancient Authors, is the best-known work of John Lemprière, an English classical scholar. Published in Reading in November 1788 and later edited by various scholars, the dictionary long remained a readable if not absolutely trustworthy reference book in mythology and classical history. Lemprière wished "to give the most accurate and satisfactory account of all the proper names which occur in reading the Classics, and by a judicious collection of anecdotes and historical facts to draw a picture of ancient times, not less instructive than entertaining."

The dictionary has been a handbook for teachers, journalists, dramatists and poets for almost 200 years, and John Keats is said to have known the book almost by heart. "Far from being just an ordinary dictionary, however, Lemprière's encyclopedic work is full of incidental details and stories which bring the mythical past to life." It is also assumed that the great scholar Richard Valpy helped Lemprière with the dictionary.

Many ships of the Royal Navy were named from Greek and Roman mythology during the Napoleonic Wars. Lord Sandwich, the First Lord of the Admiralty, had a copy of this book on his desk and simply plucked a name from within. For example, HMS Bellerophon, HMS Charon, HMS Orion, HMS Leander, HMS Minotaur, HMS Pegasus, HMS Phaeton, HMS Theseus, and HMS Venus were all named in this way.

In 1794 a Latin-language Bibliotheca Classica was published anonymously in Deventer in Holland. The introduction criticised Lemprière's work, but the book itself largely consisted of a translation of Lemprière, even to the extent of incorporating errors that had been corrected in the 1792 edition.

== Editions ==
- Bibliotheca Classica or Classical Dictionary, Reading, 1788.
- Bibliotheca Classica or a Classical Dictionary.....The Second Edition greatly enlarged, London, for T. Cadell, 1792.
- Bibliotheca Classica or Classical Dictionary, 3rd Edition, London, for T Cadell et al, 1797 (Later editions: 1815, 1818, 1828 - 15th edition, printed by A[ndrew] & R[obert] Spottiswoode, New-Street-Square, 1832, 1838, 1843, 1888).
- Bibliotheca Classica or Classical Dictionary, New York, 1833.
- Bibliotheca Classica or Classical Dictionary, W.E. Dean, New York, 1836. Revised and Corrected, and Divided, under Separate Heads, into Three Parts: Part I. Geography, Topography, etc. Part II. History, Antiquities, etc. Part III. Mythology by Lorenzo L. Da Ponte and John D. Ogilby. 10th American Edition. Greatly Enlarged in the Historical Department, by Lorenzo L. Da Ponte.
- Bibliotheca Classica or Classical Dictionary, 10th American Edition, W.E. Dean, New York, 1839. Greatly Enlarged in the Historical Department by Lorenzo L. Da Ponte and John D. Ogilby.
- Lemprière's Classical Dictionary, (Facsimile) London: Bracken Books, 1984.
- Lemprière's Classical Dictionary, Senate Books, 1994.

== In fiction ==
- Lemprière, and specifically the writing of his dictionary, formed the basis for the novel Lemprière's Dictionary by Lawrence Norfolk.
- In The Gaudy by J.I.M. Stewart there is a character called Lemprière. The narrator is familiar with the name because of Keats' knowledge of the dictionary.

== See also ==
- Dictionary of Greek and Roman Antiquities by William Smith
