= USS Flying Fish =

Three ships of the United States Navy have borne the name USS Flying Fish, named in honor of the flying fish.

- USS Flying Fish (1838), was a schooner, purchased in 1838 and sold in 1842. She was used in Charles Wilkes exploration of Antarctica
- USS Flying Fish (SS-229), was a Gato-class submarine, commissioned in 1942 and struck in 1958
- USS Flying Fish (SSN-673), was a Sturgeon-class submarine, commissioned in 1970 and struck in 1996
