= HMS Flying Fish (1803) =

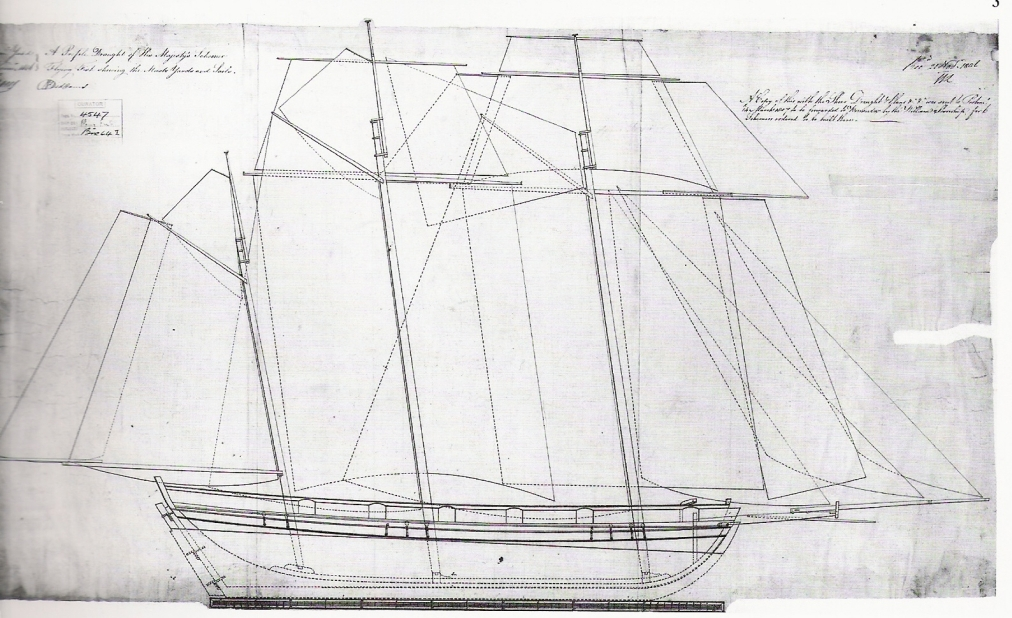

History

France
- Name: Flying Fish
- Launched: 1801
- Acquired: By purchase
- Renamed: Poisson Volant on purchase
- Captured: June–July 1803

United Kingdom
- Name: HMS Flying Fish
- Acquired: June–July 1803 (by capture)
- Fate: Foundered November 1807

General characteristics
- Type: Schooner
- Tons burthen: 150 32/94 (bm)
- Length: 78 ft 8 in (23.98 m) (overall)
- Beam: 21 ft 7 in (6.58 m)
- Depth of hold: 7 ft 10 in (2.39 m)
- Propulsion: Sails
- Sail plan: Schooner
- Armament: 12 guns

HMS Flying Fish was the American-built schooner Flying Fish, launched in 1801. She became the French privateer schooner Poisson Volant, which the British captured in 1803 in the West Indies and took into the Royal Navy. She captured a privateer and recaptured some small merchant vessels. She was renamed Firefly in 1807, but was lost with all hands when she foundered later that year.

== Origins ==
Poissant Volant was the American schooner Flying Fish, built at Baltimore in 1801. She was then bought by the French.

== Capture ==
In mid-1803, the squadron under Captain Henry William Bayntun, consisting of Cumberland, Hercule, Bellerophon , Elephant, and Vanguard captured Poisson Volant and Supérieure. The Royal Navy purchased her on 15 October 1803. The British commissioned her as Flying Fish under Lieutenant Clement Ives in June 1804.

== Service ==
On 29 June Blanche captured the Dutch schooner Nimrod, three miles south of "Saint Cruz (Corosoa)". Captain Zacharia Mudge reported that Nimrod, of four guns, was one of two schooners that had engaged Flying Fish.

By at least July, Flying Fish was under the command of Lieutenant Thomas Price. On 14 July she recaptured the Content, which the French privateer Republic (Republique) had captured the evening before off Black River. From the prisoners Price learned where he might intercept the privateer. The next day he encountered her and captured her after a five-hour chase. Republic was armed with one long gun and small arms, and had left St. Jago with a crew of 51 men. On her cruise she had taken three prizes. Another account reports that the privateer that Flying Fish captured had 37 men aboard her, and that Flying Fish succeeded in recapturing two of the privateer's prizes.

Between 1 March and 1 June 1805, Flying Fish recaptured the British ship Mary, which was carrying cargo of island produce.

== Loss ==
In 1807 Flying Fish was renamed Firefly. On 17 November she struck a submerged rock off Curacao. Lieutenant Price and all his crew were lost. (Note: Gilly reports that she was lost on 17 October, in a hurricane of the Spanish Main. He further states that her surgeon and three men were saved. Another account agrees with Hepper in date and circumstances, but reports that only the surgeon was saved.)
