= HMS Conflict (1801) =

Gunvessel of the Royal Navy

History

United Kingdom
- Name: HMS Conflict
- Ordered: 30 December 1800
- Builder: Dudman & Co., Deptford
- Laid down: January 1801
- Launched: 17 April 1801
- Commissioned: April 1801
- Captured: 24 October 1804

France
- Name: Conflict
- Acquired: 24 October 1804 by purchase of a prize
- Out of service: October 1834
- Renamed: Lynx
- Fate: Broken up November 1834

General characteristics
- Class & type: Archer-class gunbrig
- Tons burthen: (bm)
- Length: Overall: 80 ft 1 1/2 in (24.4 m); Keel: 65 ft 10 3/4 in (20.1 m)
- Beam: 22 ft 7 3/4 in (6.9 m)
- Depth of hold: 9 ft 4 1/5 in (2.8 m)

HMS Conflict was launched in 1801 at Deptford. She grounded in October 1804, with the French Navy taking possession of her. In the French navy from late 1815 on she was named Lynx. As Lynx she was present at naval actions at Cadiz (1823), where she came under fire, Algiers (1830), and possibly the river Tagus (1831). She was broken up in 1834.

== Royal Navy ==
Lieutenant Michael Dod commissioned Conflict in April 1801. Lieutenant John Sibrell replaced Dod in 1802.

On 29 March, 22 April, and 5 and 11 May 1802, Conflict and Monkey seized sundry smuggled spirits.

Lieutenant James Fegan replaced Sibrell in March 1803. In October Lieutenant David Chambers replaced Fegan.

On 8 November 1803, Conflict was cruising three to four miles off Calais when she encountered and captured the French national gunboat No. 86. The gunboat was lugger-rigged and manned by one sub-lieutenant, 27 n.c.o.'s and soldiers of the 36th. regiment of the line, and six seamen. She was armed with one long 18-pounder gun and one 8-pounder. She was also carrying 23 stand of arms, plus extensive small arms. She had arrived from Boulogne the previous evening but had been unable to get in.

In January 1804 Lieutenant Abraham Lowe replaced Chambers, and in April Lieutenant Charles Cutts Ormsby replaced Lowe.

Loss: On 23 October 1804 HMS Cruizer and her accompanying gun-brigs, including Conflict, were in action off Nieuport with two small praams and eighteen schuyts. Conflict engaged one praam in particular, Ville de Montpellier. (Note: Ville de Montpelier had been launched at Ghent in 1804. She displaced 450 tons (laden), was armed with twelve 24-pounder guns, had a crew of 38, and carried 120 soldiers.) Shallow water allowed the French to retreat as the tide fell and Conflict grounded after her pilot went below. Her crew abandoned her at the approach of French vessels, but later returned together with men from Cruizer, the hired armed cutters Admiral Mitchell, and Griffin, and some of the other ships in the squadron to try to recapture or destroy her. They discovered that she was high and dry on a sandbank and that the French had taken possession. At high tide a cutting-out expedition went in only to discover that the French had taken her further onshore where several field guns could provide covering fire. The cutting-put expedition was unsuccessful, with Cruizer suffering four officers and men wounded, Conflict losing one man killed and five wounded, and Griffin having two men wounded in the attempt. The subsequent court martial of Ormsby and his crew acquitted them, though the pilot was found guilty of having quit his station. He was mulcted of all pay due, forbidden ever to take charge of any naval vessels, and to serve six months in the Marshalsea Prison.

== French Navy ==
Conflict (Conflit) was awarded to the French Navy for 23,600 francs. She was commissioned at Dunkirk on 23 October 1806 under Vandercruce. In February 1812 she was at Rotterdam under the command of Dibletz. On 2 March 1814 she was again commissioned at Dunkirk. On 24 September she was renamed Lynx. From 22 March 1815 to 15 July (the Hundred Days), she reverted to the name Conflict; she then resumed the name Lynx. Lynx was commissioned at Cherbourg on 16 September 1818.

On 23 September 1823 Lynx, of 10 guns (or 4), was part of the French fleet in front of Cadiz during the Hundred Thousand Sons of Saint Louis war with Spain. When a bomb vessel bombarding the Spanish defences was struck by gunfire, Lynx, under the command of Lieutenant Bretteville, towed her to safety, assisted by a longboat from one of the ships of the line. A cannonball struck the longboat, killing two men.

Lynx (of 8 guns), was part of the French naval forces at the Invasion of Algiers in 1830, under the command of Lieutenant Armand. In August she returned to Toulon carrying the body of one of the sons of the French commander, General the Count Bourmont. She was also carrying invalids and six million (francs?) taken from the Casbah. On 9 August Lynx sailed for Guadeloupe, under the command of Lieutenant Barthelemy. Her previous commander had fallen ill.

In 1831 Lynx was at the Tagus river, though it is unclear if she participated in the Battle of the Tagus.

In 1832 Lynx was stationed at Loc Maria Ker (Locmariaquer – 47.57°N 2.94°E).

Towards the end of 1834 Lynx was condemned and was to move to Lorient, but she was in too bad a state.

== Fate ==
Lynx was struck at Rochefort in October 1834 and broken up in November.
