= Hired armed cutter Admiral Mitchell =

History

United Kingdom
- Name: Admiral Mitchell
- Namesake: Admiral Andrew Mitchell.
- Renamed: Sir Andrew Mitchell (1807)

General characteristics
- Type: Cutter
- Tons burthen: 13286/94 (bm)
- Propulsion: Sails
- Sail plan: Cutter or schooner
- Complement: 35
- Armament: 12 × 12-pounder carronades

His Majesty's hired armed cutter (or schooner) Admiral Mitchell served under two contracts for the British Royal Navy, one at the end of the French Revolutionary Wars and the second at the beginning of the Napoleonic Wars. She participated in several notable small engagements and actions. In 1806 the Admiralty purchased her and took her into service as the Sir Andrew Mitchell in 1807.

== First contract ==
Admiral Mitchell's first contract ran from 22 January 1800 to 26 October 1801. An item in the London Chronicle indicates that a Lieutenant Shirley commanded her in May. However, items in the Naval Chronicle suggest that Admiral Mitchell was thereafter under the command of Lieutenant John Derby (or Darby). Her duties were to carry dispatches to and from the British fleet off the coast of France, and escort convoys.

On 3 June 1801, Admiral Mitchell arrived in Portsmouth from a cruise, having recaptured, off Boulogne, two vessels, laden with iron and timber, and sent them into Dover. On 29 June 1801, Admiral Mitchell, recaptured three vessels: the brigs Supply and Favorite, and the sloop Prince of Wales.

On 25 August letters reached Plymouth that Derby had brought into Dartmouth a large American ship that had been sailing from New York to Havre de Grace. She had a cargo of "India goods of various descriptions, valued per manifest at £50,000, supposed French property as a French merchant, supercargo, and family on board going to Old Prance". The cutter Alert was in company at the time.

On 28 October, Derby sailed Admiral Mitchell into Catwater. There she and all the hired craft turned in their stores and guns to the yard and gunwharf.

== Second contract ==
Admiral Mitchell's second contract ran from 26 August 1803 to 6 April 1805.

Lieutenant Alexander Shippard assumed command, apparently before the contract took effect. (Note: Shippard had been commander of Placentia when she wrecked in 1794.) Admiral Mitchell was attached to the fleet under Lord Keith for the guard of the Narrow Seas, that is, the English Channel. On 21 August 1803 Shippard landed Georges Cadoudal, the Chouan chief, at Biville, between Dieppe and Tréport, and on 16 January in the following year he landed General Pichegru at the same place.

In between, on 21 October 1803 Captain Robert Honyman of Leda sighted a convoy off Boulogne of six French sloops, some armed, under the escort of a gun-brig. He sent Harpy and Lark to pursue them but the winds were uncooperative and the squadron was unable to engage. Instead, Shippard brought up Admiral Mitchell and attacked the convoy. After two and a half hours of cannonading, Admiral Mitchell succeeded in driving one sloop and the brig, which was armed with twelve 32-pounder guns, on the rocks. Admiral Mitchell had one gun dismounted, suffered damage to her mast and rigging, and had five men wounded, two seriously. Lloyd's Patriotic Fund awarded Shippard a presentation sword worth 50 guineas. Shippard also received promotion to the rank of commander on 3 March 1804. Head money for the brig was paid 24 years later, in December 1827. (Note: A first-class share was worth £73 5s 9d; a sixth-class share, that of an ordinary seaman, was worth £2 11s 11¼d.)

Lieutenant John Harper also commanded Admiral Mitchell briefly, possibly in late 1803 or early 1804. Rear-Admiral Bartholomew S. Rowley, for whom Harper had been flag lieutenant, placed him on Admiral Mitchell, and sent him on a confidential mission to the coast of France. Harper then transferred briefly to the hired armed cutter Duke of Clarence, which was also on the Guernsey station.

By 12 February 1804 Admiral Mitchell was under the command of Lieutenant Alexander Shippard. On that day he was in command when Admiral Mitchell and the revenue cutter Hound recaptured Perseverance. At some point thereafter, Lieutenant Richard Williams assumed command of Admiral Mitchell.

At 4 P.M. on 23 October 1804, a French flotilla of two prams and eighteen armed schuyts left Ostend for the westward. A British squadron consisting of Cruizer, Commander John Hancock, the gun-brigs Blazer, Lieutenant John Hinton, Conflict, Lieutenant Charles Cutts Ormsby, Tigress, Lieutenant Edward Nathaniel Greensword, and Escort, Lieutenant Joseph Gulstone Garland, and the hired armed cutters Admiral Mitchell and Griffin, gave chase. They succeeded in bringing the leading pram to action by 5:18, and in a little over an hour silencing her. However, the tide was falling, darkness was coming on, and the vessels were in shoal water and in unfamiliar sands and currents. Cruizer hauled off and anchored but Conflict had already grounded, due to the fault of her pilot. When they found that they could not free her, Lieutenant Ormsby and his crew abandoned her and rowed her boats to Cruiser. Hancock sent Ormsby back with Admiral Mitchell providing cover in an attempt to recover or destroy Conflict, but they discovered that she was already high and dry on a sandbank, and in French hands.

At high tide Hancock sent in boats to try to bring her off, or destroy her, with Admiral Mitchell and Griffin, reinforced for the purpose, providing support. However, by that time the French had hauled Conflict further onshore and brought up field pieces and howitzers. The boat party was forced to withdraw after having suffered three men wounded. In all, the British lost one man killed and 11 wounded, none from Admiral Mitchell.

== Sir Andrew Mitchell ==
The Admiralty purchased Admiral Mitchell in 1806 and took her into service on 19 February 1807 as the schooner Sir Andrew Mitchell. She was apparently commissioned in the Leeward Islands.
