= HMS Quail (1806) =

History

United Kingdom
- Name: HMS Quail
- Ordered: 11 December 1805
- Builder: Custance & Stone, Great Yarmouth
- Laid down: February 1806
- Launched: 26 April 1806
- Fate: Sold 1816

United Kingdom
- Name: Quail
- Acquired: 1816 by purchase
- Fate: Last listed 1826

General characteristics
- Class & type: Cuckoo-class schooner
- Tons burthen: 751/94 (bm)
- Length: 56 ft 2 in (17.1 m) (overall); 42 ft 4 1/8 in (12.9 m) (keel)
- Beam: 18 ft 3 in (5.6 m)
- Depth of hold: 8 ft 6 in (2.6 m)
- Propulsion: Sails
- Sail plan: Schooner
- Complement: 20
- Armament: 4 × 12-pounder carronades

HMS Quail was a Royal Navy Cuckoo-class schooner of four 12-pounder carronades and a crew of 20. Custance & Stone built her at Great Yarmouth and launched her in 1806. Her decade-long career appears to have been relatively uneventful. She was sold in 1816 into mercantile service, possibly to serve as a whaler, though she ended up trading in the South Atlantic until late in 1819. She was last listed in 1826.

== Service ==
Quail was commissioned in June 1806 under Lieutenant Patrick Lowe for the Channel. In 1807 she was under Lieutenant Isaac Charles Smith Collett for the North Sea. (Note: In February 1807 Collett had been captain of Quail's sister ship, Woodcock when she had wrecked.) On 6 July Quail captured Drie Gebroders.

She also was at the surrender of the Danish Fleet after the Battle of Copenhagen on 7 September. (Note: The prize money amounted to £3 8s for an ordinary seaman, or slightly over two months' wages.) Quail shared, with many other ships in the British fleet at Copenhagen, in the prize money for several captures in August: Hans and Jacob (17 August), Die Twee Gebroders (21 August), and Aurora, Paulina, and Ceres (30 and 31 August). (Note: The share of the prize money for an ordinary seaman for all five together was 7s 10d, or about a week's wages.)

On 16 November Leeds, of London, was returning to London from Petersburg when she was on shore on the Middle Ground. Quail and boats from Vanguard were able to get Leeds off after she had been stuck for 36 hours.

In 1809 Lieutenant John Osborn took command. On 19 May 1809 he captured Jonge Jacob, P. Hansen, master. On 25 July Quail was in company Strenuous and the hired armed cutter Albion when Albion captured Maria Catherina. Osborn sailed Quail for the Mediterranean on 11 September 1811.

In April 1814 Quail was under the command of Lieutenant Alexander Stewart. On 10 August 1815 Quail arrived at Plymouth with dispatches from the Mediterranean. She had left Gibraltar on 16 July.

Disposal: Quail was paid off into ordinary in October 1815, and put up for sale at Plymouth on 14 December. She was sold at Plymouth, or Yarmouth on 11 January 1816 for £260.

== Mercantile service ==
Quail appeared in the Register of Shipping (RS) volume for 1818.

Year	Master	Owner	Trade	Source
1818	J.Britten	Captain & Co.	London–Southern Fishery	RS

The designation of her trade being "Southern Fishery" would normally signal employment as a whaler. Quail did sail to the South Atlantic, but there is no indication that she engaged in whaling or sealing. In 1817 and 1818 she appeared in Lloyd's List(('))s ship arrival and departure (SAD) data sailing to and from Buenos Aires, Montevideo, the Cape of Good Hope, Rio de Janeiro, and Maldonado under a succession of masters, Britten (or Briton), Tulloch, Hern, and Hunter. There was no mention of Quail arriving or leaving anywhere after 1819.

Year	Master	Owner	Trade	Source
1826	J.Britten	Captain & Co.	London–Southern Fishery	LR

== Fate ==
Quail was last listed in Lloyd's Register (LR) and the RS in the 1826 volumes.
