= Leeds (1805 ship) =

History

United Kingdom
- Builder: Quebec
- Launched: 1805
- Fate: Last listed in 1816

General characteristics
- Tons burthen: 224, or 227 (bm)
- Length: 88 ft (27 m)
- Beam: 24 ft (7.3 m)

Leeds was launched in Quebec in 1805 and transferred her registry to the United Kingdom that year. She may have been captured in 1809, but if so, she returned to British ownership. She was last listed in 1816.

== Career ==
Leeds first appeared in Lloyd's Register (LR) in 1806.

Year	Master	Owner	Trade	Source
1806	J.Hutchins	London	London–Quebec	LR
1807	Hutchin; C.Smith	London; Hobbs & Co.	London–Quebec; London–Baltic	LR

On 16 November 1807 Leeds was returning to London from Petersburg when she got on shore on the Middle Ground. HMS Quail and boats from Vanguard were able to get Leeds off after she had been stuck for 36 hours.

Lloyds List (LL) reported that on 29 December 1809, that a French privateer had captured Leeds, Smith, master, as Leeds was sailing from Rio Janeiro to Malta. The privateer, pierced for 12 guns but mounting five, and 120 men, carried her prize to Algiers.

However, on 2 November 1810 LL reported that Leeds, Smith, master, from Rio de Janeiro, had gone on shore at Liverpool on 30 October. It was feared that the cargo had suffered material damage. It is currently not clear whether earlier report of a capture was incorrect, or whether Leeds had come into British hands by recapture or ransom.

Year	Master	Owner	Trade	Source
1811	G.Smith	Hobbs & Co.	Liverpool–Brazil	LR
1812	G.Smith	Hobbs & Co.	Liverpool–Malta	LR
1816	G.Smith	Hobbs & Co.	Liverpool–Malta	LR

== Fate ==
Leeds was last listed in 1816.
