= HMS Bold (1801) =

Gunvessel of the Royal Navy

History

United Kingdom
- Name: HMS Bold
- Ordered: 30 December 1800
- Builder: Wells & Co, Blackwall Yard
- Laid down: January 1801
- Launched: 16 April 1801
- Completed: By 9 May 1801
- Fate: Broken up in April 1811

General characteristics
- Class & type: Archer-class gun-brig
- Tons burthen: 17929/94 (bm)
- Length: 80 ft 8 in (24.6 m) (overall); 65 ft 10 1/4 in (20.1 m) (keel)
- Beam: 22 ft 7 1/2 in (6.9 m)
- Depth of hold: 9 ft (2.74320 m)
- Sail plan: Brig
- Complement: 50
- Armament: 2 × 32-pounder carronades + 10 × 18-pounder carronades + 2 × 8-inch howitzers

HMS Bold was a 14-gun Archer-class gun-brig of the Royal Navy built at Blackwall Yard. She took part in several minor actions and captured some prizes before she grounded in 1811 and was broken up shortly thereafter.

== Service ==
Bold was commissioned under Lieutenant James Ides Short, for the Nore. Lieutenant James Agassiz replaced him in October 1801, and then in June 1802, Lieutenant William Chivers replaced Agassiz.

On 18 October 1804, Bold was in company with the hired armed brig Ann and cutter Florence and the brig-sloop Cruizer when Cruizer captured the 17-gun privateer Contre-Amiral Magon in the North Sea. Actually, Cruizer left Bold, Ann and Florence behind during the pursuit and they played no part in the capture.

On 15 March 1805 Bold was in company with Cruizer and Minx when they captured the Industria. (Note: A seaman's share of the prize money was £1 18s 2½d.) On the last day of March Bold and Ann captured the Neptunus. On 3 August, Bold was in a squadron with Blazer, Basilisk, Tigress, Piercer, Ariadne and Furious when they captured Frederick Wilhelm.

On 2 November Bold and Watchfl recaptured Ceres, John and Amy, and George.

On 1 October 1806 Bold captured Conceicas e Almas.

Lieutenant William Slaughter took command in 1805; Then at some point in 1806 Lieutenant William Chivers resumed command.

On 29 May 1810 boats from Bold, Desiree, Quebec, and Britomart, all under the command of Lieutenant Samuel Radford, attacked several French armed vessels in the Vlie. They drove ashore and burned a French lugger of six guns and 26 men, and captured and brought out another lugger of 12 guns and 42 men, a French privateer schuyt of four guns, a Dutch gunboat, and a small row boat. The British had no casualties; the French lost one man killed and three wounded.

== Fate ==
Bold was one of several vessels driven ashore near Yarmouth, Isle of Wight in a gale on 6 January 1811, but the crew was saved. She was broken up at Sheerness in April that year.
