= Haags Historisch Museum =

Museum in The Hague, Netherlands

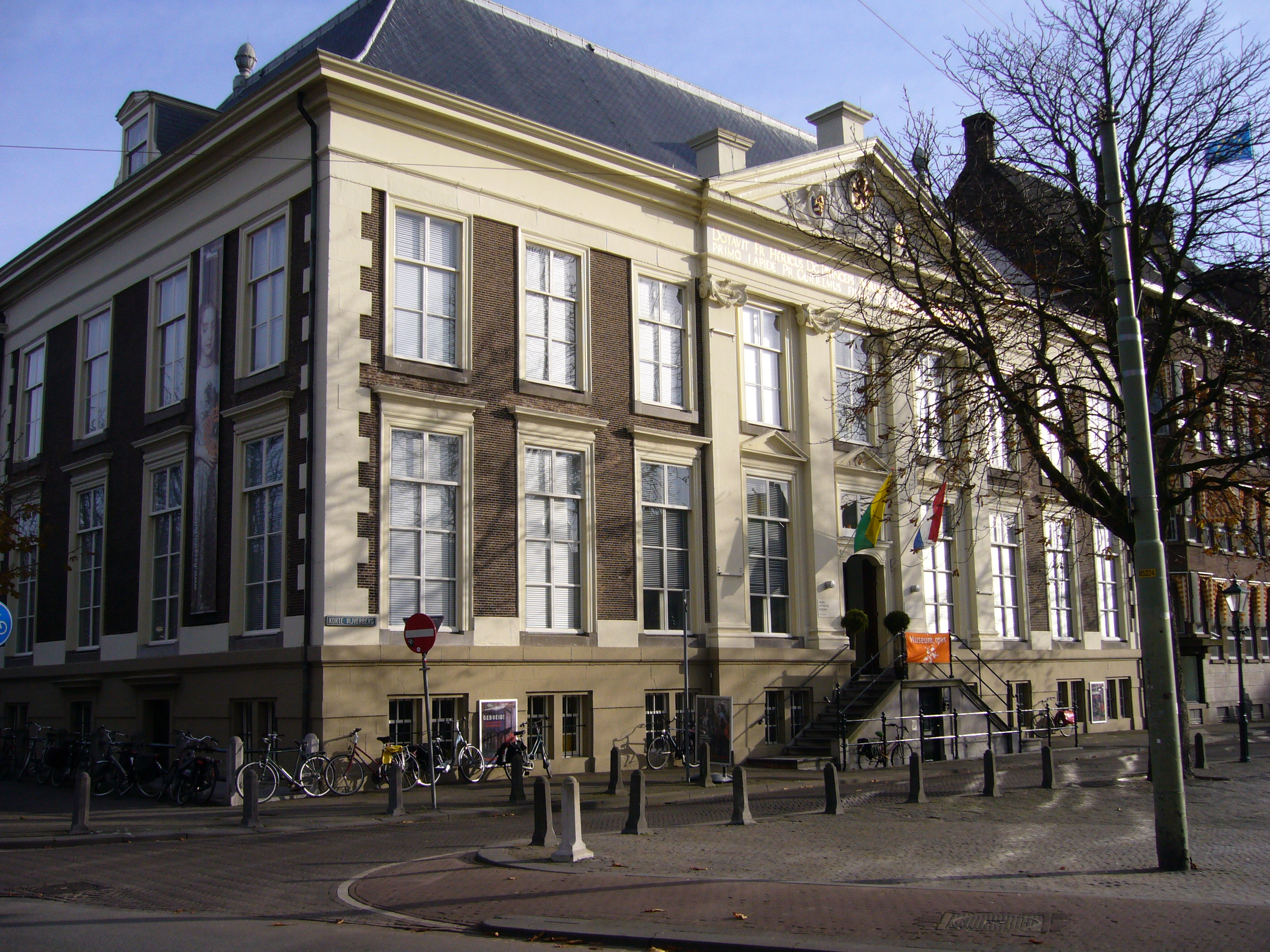
- Facade of Haags Historisch Museum, The Hague
- Location: The Hague, Netherlands
- Coordinates: 52.0813°N 4.3140°E
- Website: https://www.haagshistorischmuseum.nl/

The Haags Historisch Museum is a museum situated on the Korte Vijverberg in The Hague, Netherlands, dedicated to the history of the city. It is based in the one-time guild house of Saint Sebastian. In the seventeenth century, this guild house was the home of the civilian militia of Saint Sebastian, whose members are depicted in some of the museum collections.

In 2024, the council of The Hague agreed an investment of around €17 million for the renovation of the building housing the museum. The museum is planned to be closed from autumn 2024 to spring 2027 while the refurbishment takes place. The refurbished building is being designed by DP6 architects, who will create a new reception foyer, larger gallery spaces and better visitor routing.

== Collection ==
The museum has a collection of around 7,500 objects. This includes silsver guild vases, an almost five meter wide panorama of The Hague created by Jan van Goyen, dolls' houses by Lita de Ranitz en paintings by Jan van Ravesteyn, Paulus Constantijn la Fargue en Jan Steen, and also unusual objects such as the finger of Cornelis de Witt and the tongue of his brother Johan de Witt.

On the main floor of the museum is the fixed display relating to Power - 800 years of the Binnenhof. It tells the story of The Hague and in particular that of the Binnenhof, showing objects and paintings from the 16th to the 21st century.

The first floor hosts changing exhibitions, always related to The Hague. On the second floor the history of The Hague since 1945 is represented, including the dollhouse collection

In the basement, around 100 objects contributed by participants in the Masterpieces of the MijnDenHaag (My The Hague) project are exhibited. Participants tell the story of their object and their connection to the city.

The Hague Historical Museum also has a replica 19th-century salon. During weekends and school holidays, children can learn what life was like in The Hague in the 19th century.

== History ==
From the eighteenth century onwards, painting and objects related to life in The Hague, particularly portraits related to magistrates, councillors and the city began to be shown in the city town hall. The collection was transferred to a house on the Beestenmarkt in 1871, where nineteenth-century art was shown; this became the first museum in The Hague. After a few years (1884) the collection moves to the guild house of Saint Sebastian. In 1912, the art and historical collection are split up, leaving a distinctive historical character to the museum in the guild house.

In 1934, the collections are reunited as part of the Berlage-designed museum in The Hague (now the Kunstmuseum). However, the art collection received greater visibility, and the historical collection largely disappeared from view. It was not until the 1980s that the historical collection returned to its spot in the guild house of Saint Sebastian; in 1991 the Kunstmuseum gave formal managerial control of the collection to the newly created Haags Historische Museum.

== Organisation ==
Tjeerd Vrij has been director of the museum since 2020, when he replaced Marco van Baalen. The museum has around 30 full time staff. The museum is managed in tandem with the Rijksmuseum de Gevangenpoort via the Stichting Haags Historisch Museum en Rijksmuseum de Gevangenpoort. Together with the Gevangenpoort museum, it shares a budget of around 4m Euros per year.
