= Hired armed cutter Griffin =

Two vessels named His Majesty's hired armed cutter Griffin served the British Royal Navy, the first during the French Revolutionary Wars and the second during the Napoleonic Wars. The descriptions of the two Griffins are similar enough to suggest they may have been the same vessel.

== First contract ==
Griffin served from 13 September 1794 until 1 November 1801. She was of 70 85/94 tons (bm), and carried ten 3-pounder guns.

On 28 January 1797 Griffin anchored in the Yarmouth roads with her prize, the French privateer lugger Liberté. After a three-and-a-half-hour-long chase, Griffin was able to capture Liberté at the entrance of the Ship-Wash, Yarmouth's sand banks. Liberté was carried three carriage and four swivel guns, and had a crew of 18 men. She had "infested" the coast for some time. Griffin's master was B. Fisk.

On 29 March 1799 Griffin and several other vessels were in company with Latona or in sight at the capture of the galiot Neptunus. Griffin shared with the sloop Scorpion and the hired armed cutter Jane one month later, on 26 April, in the capture of the Adelaide, Bose, master.

Mr. James Olifant was master on Griffin when she shared with other vessels in the capture of the Calypso, M.T. Schulten, master, (3 May) and the Resolution (14 May). The other two British vessels were again Scorpion and Jane.

On 16 October Griffin captured Fortuna, Blood, master. He was also her commander when she captured the fishing vessels Stadt Egerfund, Welvaarin, and Stadt Embden.

== Second contract ==
Griffin served from 15 June 1803 until 12 December 1805. She was of 705/94 tons (bm), and carried six 3-pounder guns.

On 20 September 1803 Griffin captured Pylade.

On 3 January 1804, Archer captured the French lugger gunvessel №432. Archer and Griffin then captured a dogger, a schuyt, and two Blankenberg fishing vessels. All the vessels were part of a convoy sailing to Boulogne. The schyut was carrying gin, and the fishing vessels knees for boats. Each vessel also had three or four soldiers on board. Griffin had to undergo heavy fire from the shore as she helped capture the vessels. Lieutenant Charles Stewart commanded Griffin. The other French vessels were later identified as №17, №10, №11, №432, and a second №10. Immortalite led the British squadron and shared in the proceeds of the capture.

Griffin, under the command of Lieutenant Robert Forbes, was part of a squadron consisting also of the gun-brigs Blazer, Conflict, Escort, and Tigress, and the cutter Admiral Mitchell, all under the command of Commander John Hancock in Cruizer.

At 4 P.M. on 23 October 1804, a French flotilla of two prams and eighteen armed schuyts left Ostend for the westward. Cruizer and her squadron gave chase. They succeeded in bringing the leading pram to action by 5:18, and in a little over an hour silencing her. However, the tide was falling, darkness was coming on, and the vessels were in shoal water and in unfamiliar sands and currents. Cruizer hauled off and anchored but Conflict had already grounded, due to the fault of her pilot. When they found that they could not free her, Lieutenant Ormsby and his crew abandoned her and rowed her boats to Cruiser. Hancock sent Ormsby back with Admiral Mitchell providing cover in an attempt to recover or destroy Conflict, but they discovered that she was already high and dry on a sandbank, and in French hands.

At high tide Hancock sent in boats to try to bring her off, or destroy her, with Admiral Mitchell and Griffin, reinforced for the purpose, providing support. However, by that time the French had hauled Conflict further onshore and brought up field pieces and howitzers. The boat party, which was under Forbes' command, was forced to withdraw after having suffered three men wounded. Cruizer suffered four officers and men wounded, Conflict lost one man killed and five wounded, and Griffin had two men wounded in the attempt. In all, the British lost one man killed and 11 wounded.

Lieutenant Robert Forbes still commanded Griffin on 9 April 1805 when she captured Vrow Hendricke, Meltings, master. On 16 June Griffin captured Rowena, Robinson Potter, master. The condemnation was appealed, and the case was not settled in Griffin's favor until March 1809. Rowena had imported sugar and coffee from Martinique, stopped at Newport to take on some American cargo, and then proceeded to Antwerp. The court ruled that at the time of capture Rowena and her cargo were enemy property.
