= Hired armed cutter Duke of Clarence =

Royal navy hired armed cutter (1794–1804)

His Majesty's hired armed cutter Duke of Clarence, named for William Henry, Duke of Clarence, served the British Royal Navy under two contracts, one during the French Revolutionary Wars, and one at the beginning of the Napoleonic Wars. She was lost on 25 November 1804, but without loss of life.

== First contract ==
Duke of Clarence served the Royal Navy under contract from 12 June 1794 until 11 November 1801. She was of 6541/94 tons (bm), and carried eight 3-pounder guns.

== Second contract ==
Duke of Clarence served from 14 June 1803 until her loss on 25 November 1804. From early 1804, Lieutenant John Harper commanded her for many months on the Jersey and Guernsey station. He had transferred from the hired armed cutter Admiral Mitchell.

From 1803 on HMS Africaine maintained a blockade at Hellevoetsluis where there were two French frigates. One day while Africaine was maintaining this blockade, the French general at Scheveningen had four boys shrimping in Africaine's jolly boat fired upon. Captain Thomas Manby of Africaine immediately seized sixty fishing boats that he then sent to Yarmouth. This cost The Hague its supplies of fish for some weeks. (In late 1799 Britain and The Netherlands had agreed to leave, within limits, each other's fishing boats unmolested. In July 1807 Africaine was awarded prize money for sundry fishing boats captured in May 1803. She shared the prize money with Duke of Clarence.

On 26 September 1804 Duke of Clarence left Portsmouth with a convoy for Guernsey.

On 5 October 1804, the brig Polante, arrived at Portsmouth. Polante had been sailing from Lisbon to "Charleburg" when Duke of Clarence detained her. Lloyd's List gave the brig's name as Volante, and her destination as Cherbourg.

On 27 October 1804 Lieutenant Harper was appointed to Wasp. His replacement was Lieutenant Nicholas Brent Clements.

== Loss ==
Clements received the mission to take Duke of Clarence to patrol between the Minquiers and Chausey to meet a boat bringing intelligence from France. On 24 November 1804, Duke of Clarence sighted a large French lugger and set off in chase, with the hired armed cutter Albion joining in. The lugger's crew ran their boat on shore near Granville, Manche. Duke of Clarence sent a boat in to examine the lugger, which turned out to have a cargo of oysters and cider. As Duke of Clarence awaited her boat's return she hit a submerged rock with the result that she started to fill with water. Clements gave up on any attempt to recover the lugger as Albion came up to rescue him, his officers, and crew.

On 8 December the Lisbon packet arrived at Portsmouth with news of the loss of Duke of Clarence. The report stated that she had been lost off the coast of Portugal about a month earlier. Lieutenant N. Clements, his officers, and crew had been saved, but with the loss of all their possessions.

An erroneous identification of the coast of Portugal as the location of the wreck made its way into many historical accounts.
