= Willem Bastiaan Tholen =

Dutch painter

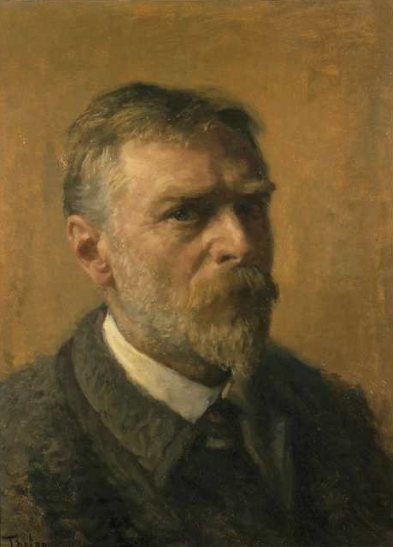
Self-portrait (1914)

Willem Bastiaan Tholen (Amsterdam, 13 February 1860 – The Hague, 5 December 1931) was a Dutch painter, draftsman and printmaker with some connections to members of the Hague School and later associated with the Amsterdam Impressionism movement.

== Biography ==
When Tholen was five years old, his family moved to Kampen. There he became friendly with the young Jan Voerman and they entered the Amsterdam academy together in 1876. Tholen earned his certificate of proficiency within a year, in turn enrolling in the Polytechnic School in Delft, where he attended drawing classes for two years. Having concluded his studies there in 1878 with a secondary school teaching certificate, he went to work as a drawing instructor at the evening secondary school in Gouda.

He spent three months in Brussels in the studio of Paul Gabriël, from whom he received his first real instruction in painting. In the following years Gabriël's advice was of particular importance for Tholen, as they worked together en plein air for many summers near Kampen and Giethoorn, among other places. In Gouda (1878-9) and Kampen (1880–85) he taught draftsmanship in order to support himself but after 1885 concentrated entirely on his own work.

In 1885 Willem Witsen invited Tholen to visit his family's country house near Baarn, where their contemporaries, George Hendrik Breitner and Anton Mauve were frequent guests. From 1887 he lived in The Hague, where he became friendly with other painters of The Hague school. He took an active part in the artistic life of The Hague and was a member of the Pulchri Studio.

Tholen established his reputation in The Hague with his landscapes of the countryside around Kampen and views of the woods near Baarn. He also frequently painted views of The Hague, the woods of Scheveningen and a series of interiors in which a window typically provides a view outside: a garden, a street illumined by sunlight or the rhythmically grouped roofs of a city. He painted the fishing boats on the beach in Scheveningen, but in contrast to Jacob Maris (whom he greatly admired), Tholen did not employ the desolate sea as a backdrop, but rather, the bustling village. He used the hustle-bustle of the city more often as a theme than was generally the case in the Hague School, depicting such subjects as construction sites, slaughterhouses, stonecutters and the sand excavations and sand barge captains on the canal between The Hague and Scheveningen.

His second wife was dollhouse collector Lita de Ranitz; they married in 1919, and he created small artworks for her collection.

== Selected paintings ==
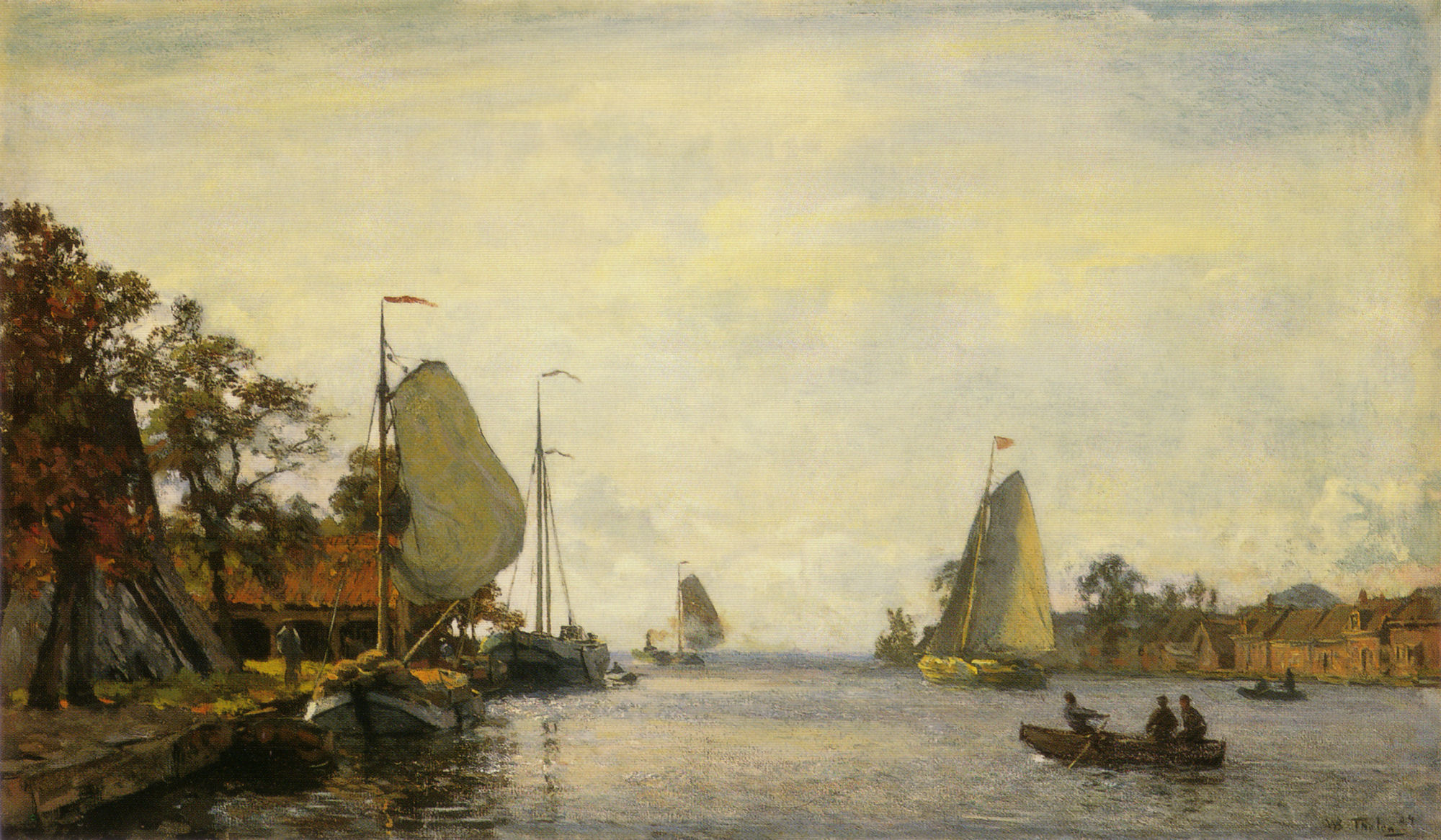
Riverscape With Sailing Boats
in the Summer

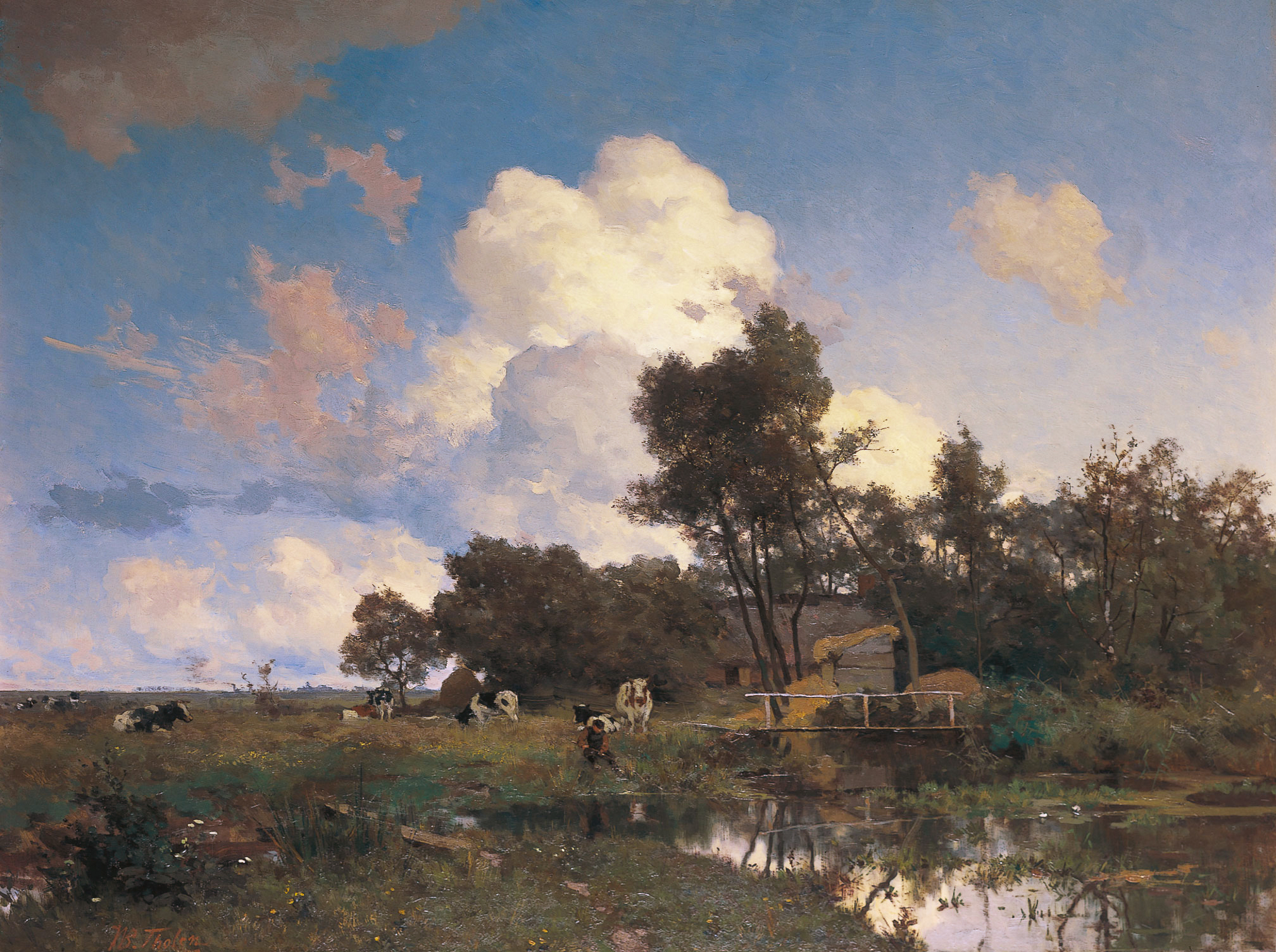
Country Landscape in Summer

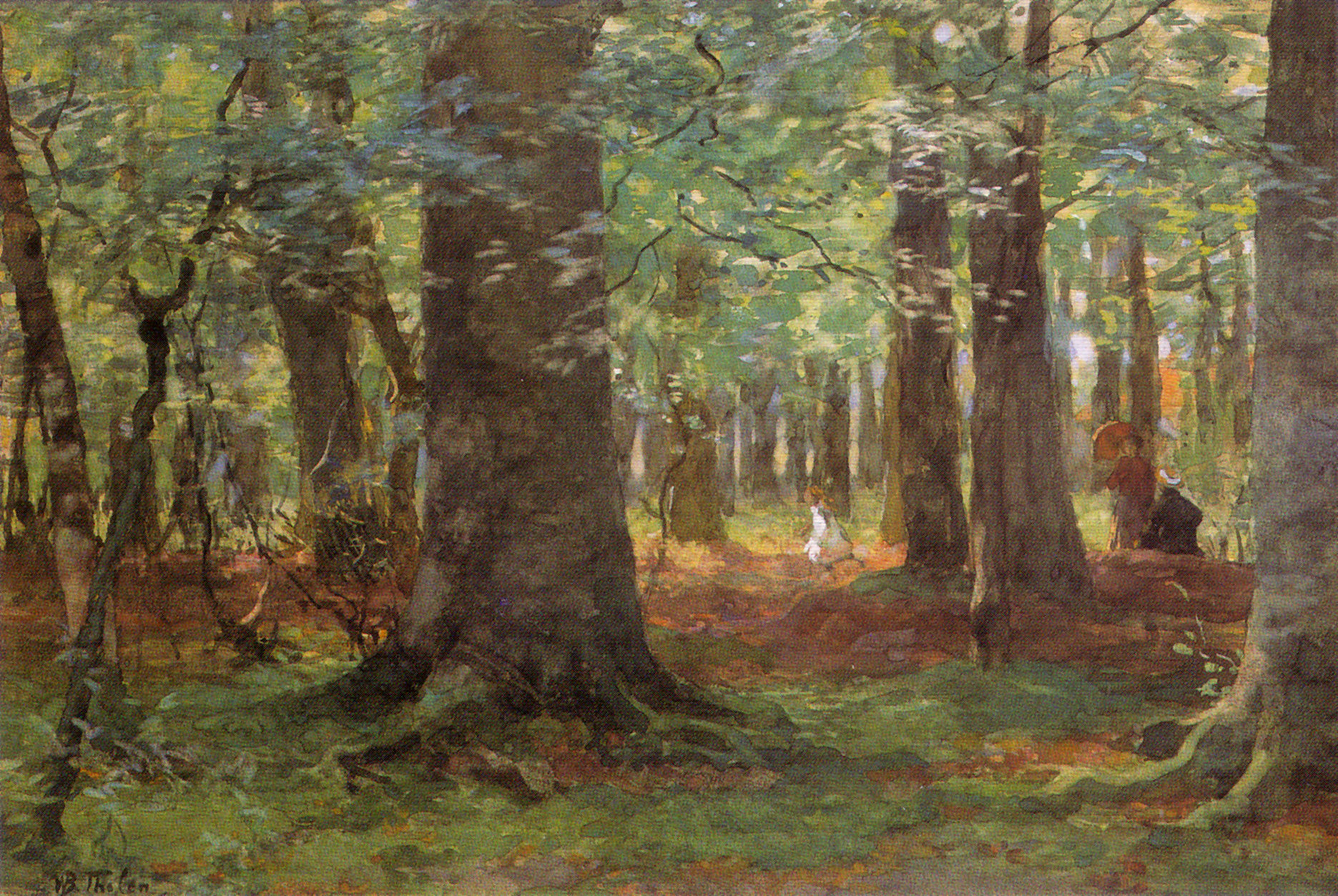
Summer Day in the Forest, a watercolor

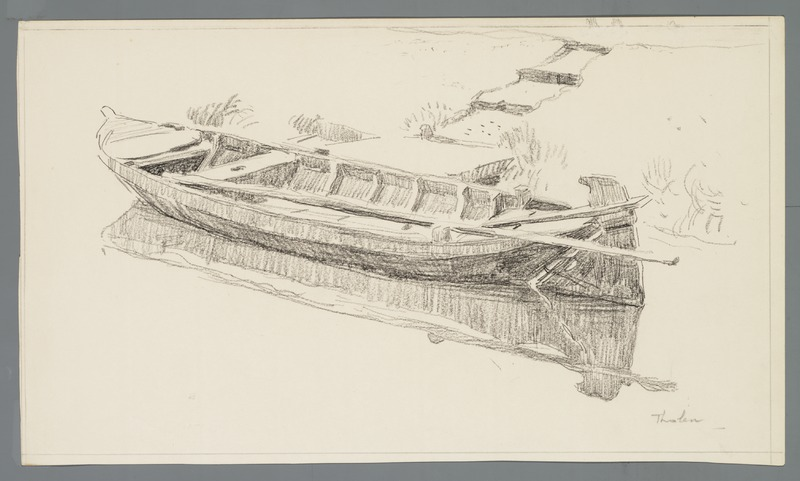
Pram, cultural heritage collection of the Zuiderzee Museum

== Sources ==
- Sillevis, John and Tabak, Anne, The Hague School Book, Waanders Uitgegevers, Zwolle, 2004 (pp 381–388)
- Visser, Evelien de: The Rotterdamsche Kunstkring’s ‘comprehensive W.B. Tholen exhibition’ in 1906. In: RKD Bulletin 2020. Accessed on 28 September 2020.
