= HMS Papillon (1803) =

Brig of the Royal Navy

History

France
- Name: Papillon
- Ordered: 16 May 1793
- Builder: Nantes
- Laid down: June 1793
- Launched: 23 August 1793
- Captured: 4 September 1803

United Kingdom
- Name: HMS Papillon
- Acquired: 4 September 1803
- Fate: Foundered September 1805

General characteristics >
- Class & type: Cerf-Volant-class brig
- Displacement: 160 tons (French)
- Tons burthen: 14539/94 (bm)
- Length: 64 ft 0 in (19.5 m) (overall); 54 ft 0 in (16.5 m) (keel)
- Beam: 22 ft 6 in (6.9 m)
- Propulsion: Sails
- Sail plan: Brig
- Complement: French service:110; British service:121
- Armament: French service:12 × 4-pounder guns; British service:Unknown

HMS Papillon was the French Navy's 12-gun brig Papillon, which the British captured in September 1803. She foundered in September 1805 with the loss of all her crew.

== French career and capture ==
Papillon was launched in 1793 and is sometimes referred to as Papillon No. 2, as the 6-gun brig-aviso Papillon was still in service. The 12-gun Papillon participated in the Croisière du Grand Hiver, an unsuccessful sortie by the French fleet at Brest on 24 December 1794.

In September 1803 the rebel slaves under General Jean-Jacques Dessalines were closely pressing the French troops in northwest Saint Domingue. Captain Walker, of Vanguard, off the Mole St. Nicholas, persuaded the General not to put the garrison of Saint-Marc to death but to march them to the Mole in safety where Vanguard would take possession of the shipping in the bay. Walker succeeded in evacuating the 850 men of the garrison, all very emaciated. He also brought out the brigs Papillon and Trois Amis (a transport), and the schooner Mary Sally, with 40 or 50 barrels of powder. Papillon was pierced for 12 guns but only mounted six. She had a crew of 52 men under the command of Mons. Dubourg.

== British service ==
The British took Papillon into service under her existing name. She was commissioned in 1804 under Lieutenant John Smyth in the Leeward Islands.

In 1805 Lieutenant William Woolsey replaced Smyth. Woolsey received a promotion to Commander in March but was not yet able to take it up.

On 15 April 1805 Papillon was anchored at Savanna-la-Mar, Jamaica, when the master of a dogger informed Woolsey that there was a Spanish privateer felucca off the west coast of the island. Woolsey realised that the felucca would escape if he approached in Papillon and so decided to use a stratagem. He borrowed a shallop from a merchant ship, disguised her as a drogger, and put on board 25 men under the command of Lieutenant Prieur. The mock drogger encountered the felucca by 8 p.m. the same evening and Prieur permitted the unsuspecting privateer to come alongside. He then had his men fire a volley into the privateer and board her. In the action, the privateer lost seven men killed or drowned, and eight badly wounded, out of a crew of 25; the British had two men slightly wounded. Four of the privateer's crew swam ashore, where the militia seized them.

The privateer was Conception, of 25 tons (bm), armed with one 3-pounder gun and small arms. She was three days out of Cuba and had taken no prizes. Woolsey delivered his prisoners and the wounded to Savanna-La-Mar.

Between 1 March and 2 June 1805 Papillon also recaptured the British schooner Desirée. HMS Heureux and HMS Hercule are also both recorded as capturing a ship of the same name during the same period. Papillon is listed in the summary seasonal report to the Admiralty as the captor of Desirée, while earlier letters credit the larger ships. In all likelihood Papillon was in company with the other ships and took actual possession.

== Fate ==
Papillon, still under Woolsey's command, was lost in September 1805, with all her crew. (Note: Admiralty records give the date of the loss as April 1805.) She and Vanguard sailed from Jamaica on 28 July as escorts to a convoy. On 25 September Papillon parted company from the convoy during a gale in the Atlantic. (Note: One report states that on 14 September she had lost her main and foremast.) The convoy arrived at Spithead on 14 October but Papillon never arrived. (Note: Later correspondence in Admiralty records calls for Papillon to be paid off, without standing wages being paid to the heirs of the crew. The letter refers to Papillon having foundered in September 1806, the year being almost certainly an error.)

== Film: Master and Commander ==
Papillon's capture of the Spanish privateer by stratagem in April 1805 bears remarkable similarities to an incident in the film Master and Commander: The Far Side of the World. Writer Patrick O'Brian drew on the Napoleonic Wars for his Aubrey–Maturin series of novels on which the film is based. Papillon is the same class of ship as used in the film, and the event's date in the film corresponds with the capture of the privateer in Jamaica on 15 April 1805.
