= HMS Vanguard (1787) =

74-gun ship of the line in the Royal Navy

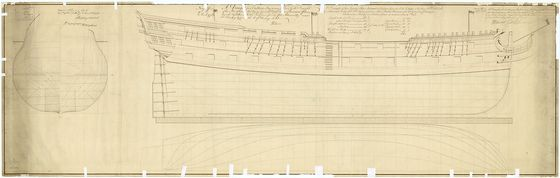
- 1:48. Plan showing the body plan, sheer lines, and longitudinal half-breadth for Vanguard courtesy of the National Maritime Museum, Greenwich, London

History

Great Britain
- Name: Vanguard
- Ordered: 9 December 1779
- Builder: Deptford Dockyard
- Laid down: 16 October 1782
- Launched: 6 March 1787
- Honours and awards: Participated in: Battle of the Nile
- Fate: Broken up, 1821

General characteristics (as built)
- Class & type: Arrogant-class ship of the line
- Tons burthen: 1,609 41/94 (bm)
- Length: 168 ft 2 in (51.3 m) (gundeck)
- Beam: 46 ft 10 in (14.3 m)
- Depth of hold: 19 ft 9 in (6.0 m)
- Propulsion: Sails
- Sail plan: Full-rigged ship
- Complement: 600
- Armament: 74 muzzle-loading, smoothbore guns: Lower gundeck: 28 × 32 pdr guns; Upper gundeck: 28 × 18 pdr guns; Forecastle: 4 × 9 pdr guns; Quarter deck: 14 × 9 pdr guns

HMS Vanguard was a 74-gun third rate Arrogant-class ship of the line built for the Royal Navy during the 1780s. Completed in 1787, she played a minor role in the French Revolutionary Wars and the Napoleonic Wars.

== Description ==
The Arrogant-class ship of the line was designed by Sir Thomas Slade, co-Surveyor of the Navy. It was one of the "common" type of 74 with lighter guns than those of the "large" classes. Vanguard was one of the slightly modified second batch of Arrogants. She measured 168 feet (51.2 m) on the gundeck and 137 feet 8 inches (42.0 m) on the keel. She had a beam of 46 feet 10 inches (14.3 m), a depth of hold of 19 feet 9 inches (6.0 m) and had a tonnage of 1,609 41/94 tons burthen. The ships' crew numbered 600 officers and ratings. They were fitted with three masts and were ship-rigged.

The ships were armed with 74 muzzle-loading, smoothbore guns that consisted of twenty-eight 32-pounder guns on their lower gundeck and twenty-eight 18-pounder guns on their upper deck. Their forecastle mounted four 9-pounder guns. On their quarterdeck they carried fourteen 9-pounder guns. On 29 December 1806, Vanguard's armament was ordered to be changed to light 24-pounders on the upper deck; the forecastle and quarterdeck mounted two light 24-pounders and four 24-pounder carronades on the former while a pair of light 24-pounders and ten 24-pounder carronades were mounted on the latter.

== Construction and career ==
Vanguard was the fifth ship of her name to serve in the Royal Navy. She was ordered on 9 December 1779 and was named on 17 April 1780. The ship was laid down at Deptford Dockyard on 16 October 1782 and was launched on 6 March 1787. She was launched on 6 March 1787 and was completed at Woolwich Dockyard on 11 May and placed in ordinary. Vanguard was commissioned by Captain Sir Andrew Hamond in June 1790.

In December 1797, Captain Edward Berry was appointed flag captain, flying Rear Admiral Sir Horatio Nelson's flag.

=== French Revolutionary Wars ===
On 27 November 1793, the ships of a squadron under the command of Captain Thomas Pasley of HMS Bellerophon captured Blonde. At the time of her capture Blonde was armed with 28 guns and had a crew of 210 men under the command of Citizen Gueria. A subsequent prize money notice listed the vessels that shared in the proceeds as Bellerophon, Vanguard, Phoenix, Latona, and Phaeton.

In 1798 Nelson was detached into the Mediterranean by Earl St. Vincent with HMS Orion, Alexander, Emerald, Terpsichore, and Bonne Citoyenne. They sailed from Gibraltar on 9 May and on 12 May were struck by a violent gale in the Gulf of Lion that carried away Vanguard's topmasts and foremast. The squadron bore up for Sardinia, Alexander taking Vanguard in tow.

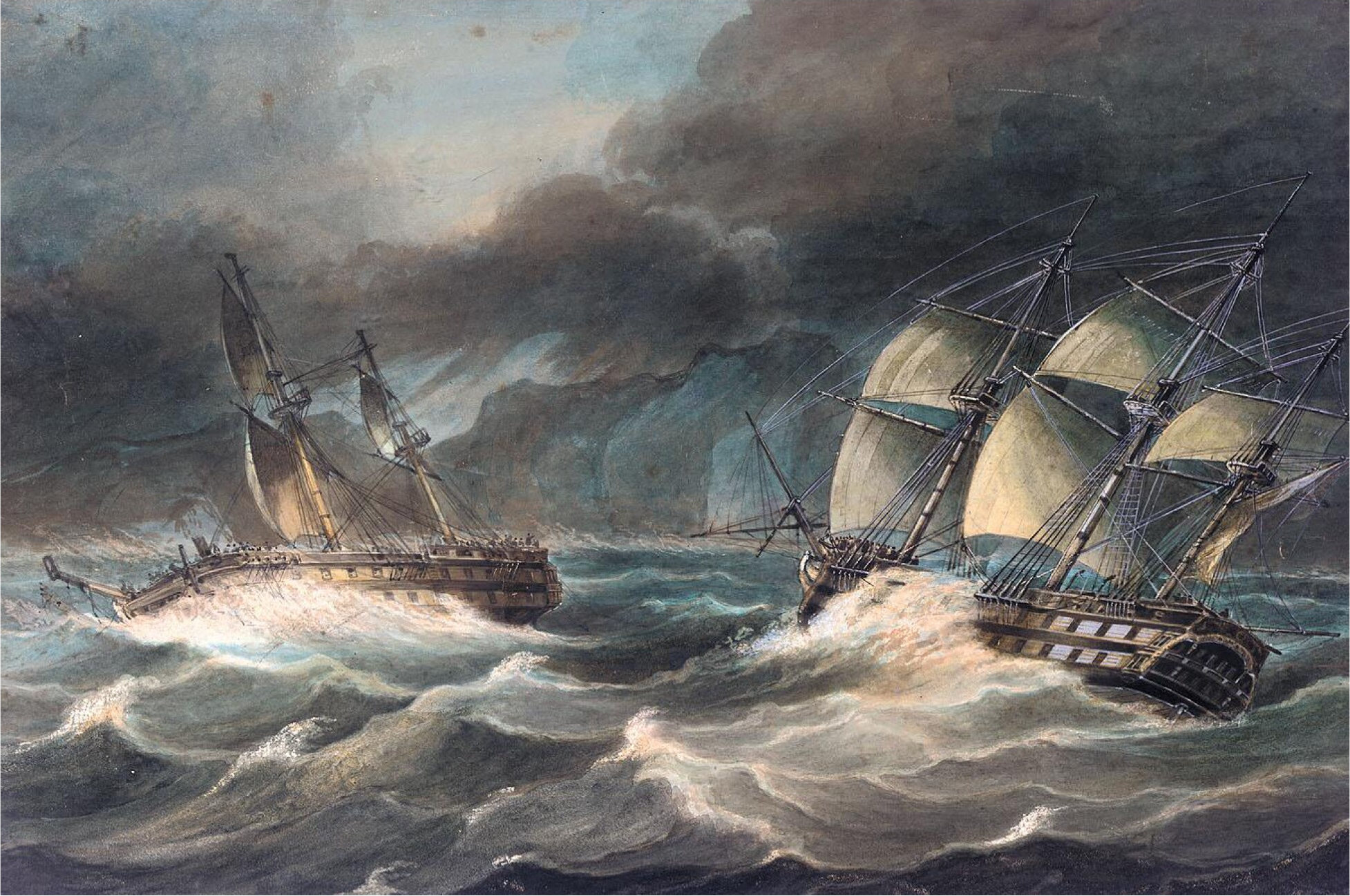
Vanguard and Alexander off Toulon

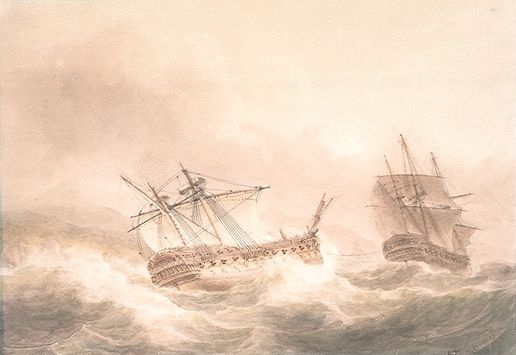
Alexander towing Vanguard

On 19 May, while Nelson was off station repairing his storm damage, Napoleon Bonaparte sailed from Toulon with a force of 72 warships and 400 transports to strike at Egypt with the intention of eventually invading India. On 13 June he occupied Malta and, on 19 June, continued the passage to Egypt arriving off Alexandria on 1 July. On 31 May, Nelson returned to Toulon to find that the French had left 13 days earlier. Searching for the enemy he reached Naples on 17 June and Messina on 20 June. Here he learnt of the fall of Malta and the probable destination of the French. He sailed for Alexandria but overtook the French and arrived on 29 June, two days before them. Finding no enemy he returned to Sicily via Asia Minor. Convinced that the French were going to Egypt he set sail once more for Alexandria.

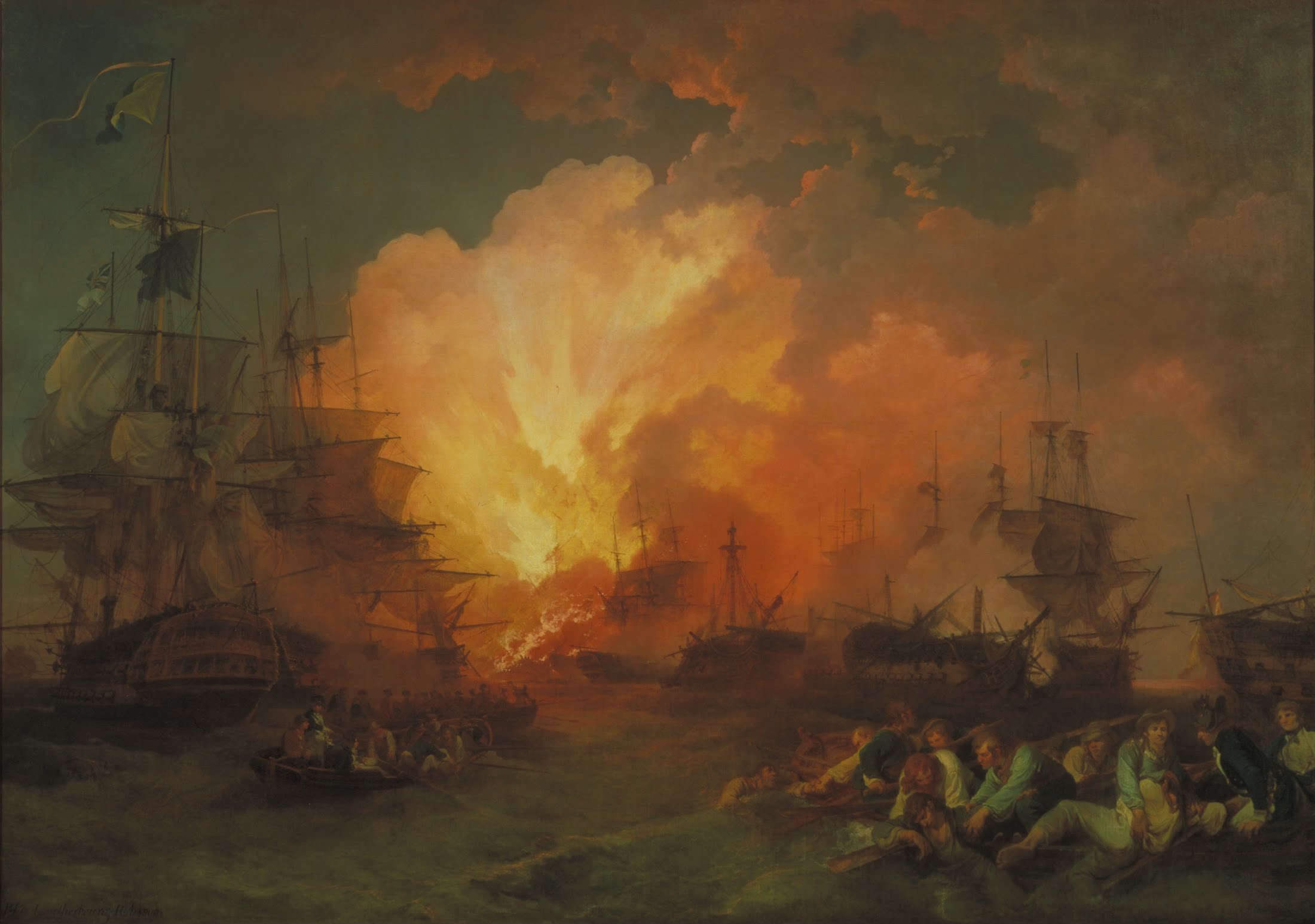
The Battle of the Nile by Philip James de Loutherbourg, 1800. Vanguard is shown on the left of the painting at the moment L'Orient explodes.

On the evening of 1 August 1798, half an hour before sunset, the Battle of the Nile began when Nelson attacked the French fleet which was moored in a strong line of battle in Aboukir Bay with gunboats, four frigates, and batteries on Aboukir Island to protect their flanks. Goliath (1781) was the leading ship and, followed by four others, she broke through the French line to anchor and fight from the shoreward side. Vanguard remained on the seaward side and soon the French van and centre were being overwhelmed by six ships on either side of their line. The French lost 11 ships of the line and two frigates. Their dead numbered 1700 and the wounded 1500. The British lost 218 killed and 678 wounded.

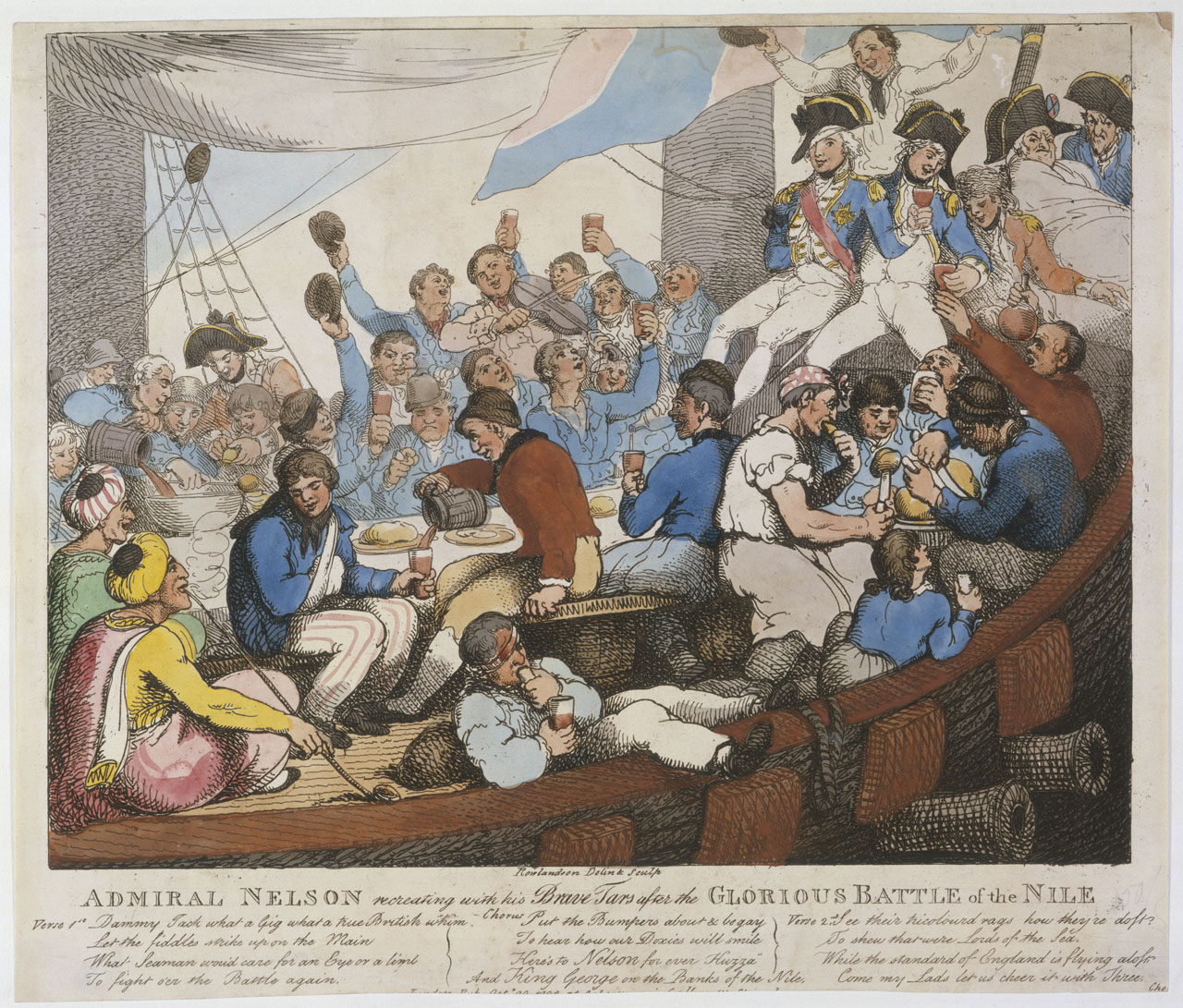
Caricature of Nelson and his men aboard Vanguard after the Battle of the Nile. This caricature reflects the national sentiment toward Nelson and his behaviour and treatment of his men. Courtesy of the National Maritime Museum, Greenwich, London.

Vanguard lost three officers killed, Thomas Seymour and John Taylor, midshipmen, and Captain Faddy of the marines. Lieutenants N. Vassal and J. Ayde, J. Campbell, the Admiral's secretary, M. Austin, the boatswain, and J. Weatherspoon and George Antrim, midshipmen, were wounded. Twenty seamen and seven marines were killed and sixty seamen and eight marines were wounded. Nelson was also wounded. On 3 August the captains of the squadron met on board Orion and agreed to present Nelson with a sword.

Vanguard sailed for Naples on 19 August and arrived on 22 September. She was in need of new masts and a bowsprit but Nelson deferred getting them until he knew the situation of Culloden (1783) which was to be careened at Naples after grounding during the battle. The King of Naples came out to meet her.

In September, Captain Thomas Hardy took command, still under Nelson's flag. Two months later a formidable French army had invaded Naples and on 16 December Vanguard was shifted out of gunshot of the ports. On 20 December Nelson, in order to evacuate the royal family and other important people, ordered the small barge of Vanguard, covered by three barges and the frigate HMS Alcmene, armed with cutlasses only, to be at the Victoria wharf. All the other boats of Vanguard and Alcmene, and the launches and carronades, were ordered to assemble on board Vanguard under the direction of Captain Hardy and row halfway to the Mola Figlio.

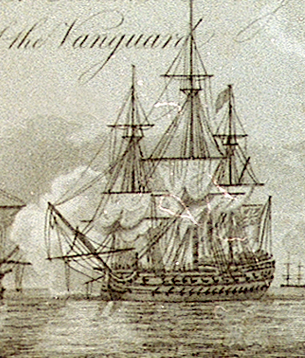
An etching of the Vanguard published in 1799

By 21 December the Neapolitan Royal Family, the British Ambassador and his family, several Neapolitan nobles and most of the English gentlemen and merchants had been embarked, numbering in all about 600 persons in the ships of the squadron. Vanguard sailed on 23 December and arrived, after a stormy passage, in Palermo on 26 December.

The ship had been the scene of the death of Prince Alberto of Naples and Sicily, one of the royal entourage on board, son of King Ferdinand VI and his wife Maria Carolina of Austria who were on board. Other royals on board were the Duke of Calabria, Prince of Salerno and their sisters the Princesses Maria Cristina, Maria Amalia and Princess Maria Antonia

Nelson shifted his flag from Vanguard to Foudroyant on 6 June 1799, taking with him Captain Hardy and a number of other officers, leaving Captain W. Brown in command. In 1800, Vanguard was taken out of commission at Portsmouth.

In 1801, under the command of Captain Sir Thomas Williams. Vanguard sailed from Portsmouth on 20 April to join the Baltic fleet. The fleet, under Vice Admiral Pole, returned on 10 August. Vanguard, St George, Spencer, Powerful, Dreadnought, Ramillies, and Zealous sailed again on 19 August to cruise off Cádiz. The first four were victualled and provisioned for five months at Gibraltar and sailed for Jamaica in December. Warrior followed them as soon as she had watered at Tetuan.

=== Napoleonic Wars ===
In 1803, under the command of Captain James Walker, Vanguard was operating out of Jamaica on the Blockade of Saint-Domingue. On 30 June, Cumberland and her squadron under Captain Henry William Bayntun were between Jean-Rabel and St. Nichola Mole in the West Indies, having just parted with a convoy when they spotted a sail of what appeared to be a large French warship. Cumberland and Vanguard approached her and after a few shots from Vanguard the French vessel surrendered, having suffered two men badly wounded, and being greatly outgunned. She proved to be the frigate Créole, of 44 guns, primarily 18-pounders, under the command of Citizen Le Ballard. She had been sailing from Cape François to Port au Prince with General Morgan (the second in command in San Domingo), his staff, and 530 soldiers, in addition to her crew of 150 men. The Royal Navy took her into service as HMS Creole.

While the British were taking possession of Créole, a small French navy schooner, under the command of a lieutenant and sailing the same course as Créole, sailed into the squadron; she too was seized. She had on board 100 bloodhounds from Cuba, which were "intended to accompany the Army serving against the Blacks."

On 2 July 1803, Bayntun's squadron captured the French privateer Superieure. Vanguard was the actual captor. The British took her into the Royal Navy as Superieure. The squadron also captured the privateer Poisson Vollant, which the Royal Navy also took into service.

About three weeks later, on 24 July, two French 74s, Duquesne and Duguay Trouin, and the frigate Guerrière put to sea from Cap-Français during a squall in an effort to evade Bellerophon, Elephant, Theseus, Tartar under Captain Perkins, and Vanguard, which were blockading the port. The French ships separated during the night but the British overtook Duquesne the following day and captured her after a short exchange of fire with Vanguard, which lost one man killed and one wounded. The prize was broken up on arrival in England after being damaged running on to the Morant Cays.

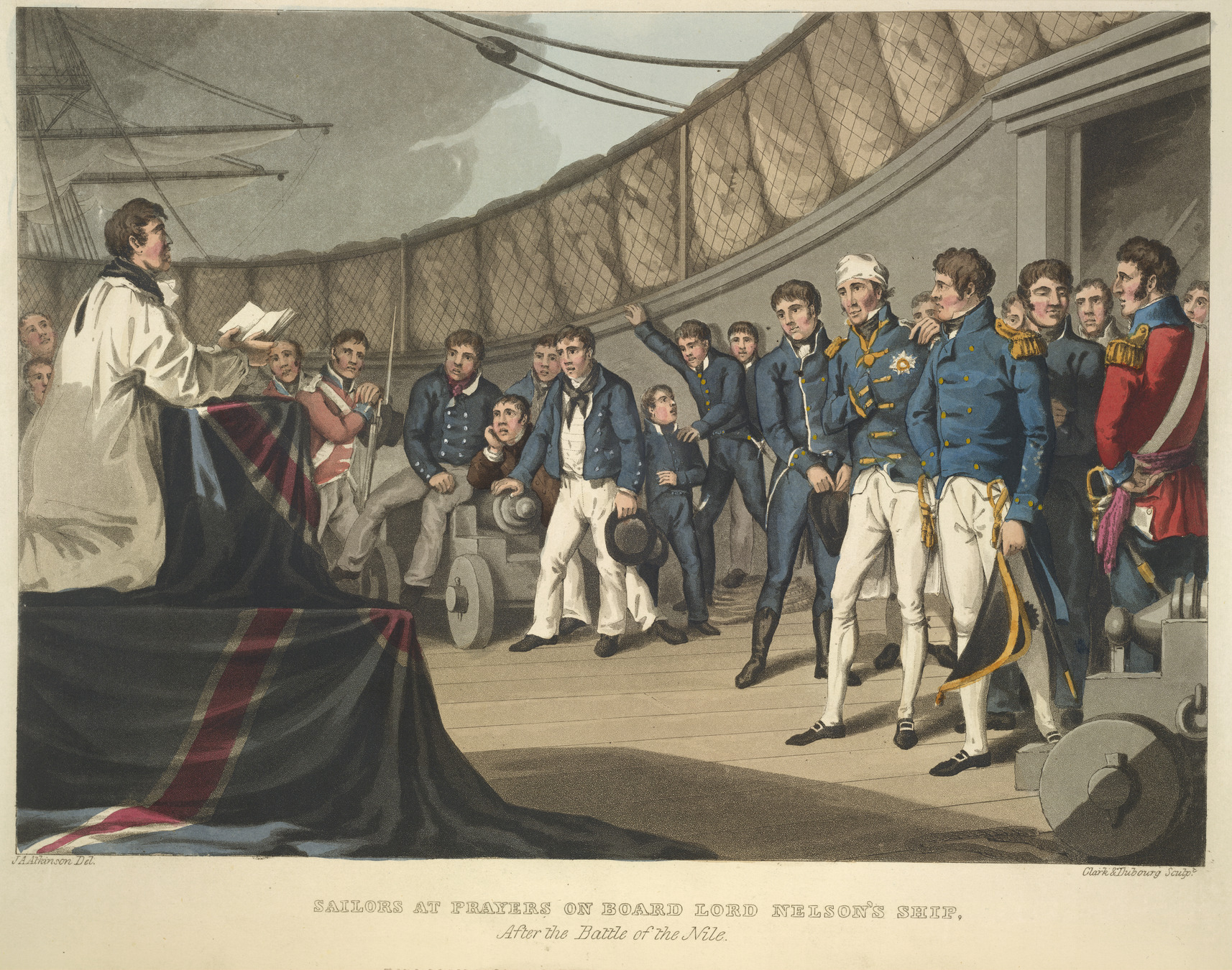
The crew at prayer after the Battle of the Nile

In September the French troops in northwest Saint Domingue were being closely pressed by the rebel slaves under General Jean-Jacques Dessalines. Captain Walker, off the Mole St. Nicholas, persuaded the General not to put the garrison of Saint-Marc to death but to march them to the Mole in safety where Vanguard would take possession of the shipping in the bay. The 850 men of the garrison, all very emaciated, were successfully evacuated, and the brig Papillon, pierced for 12 guns but only mounting 6, the brig Trois Amis, transport, and the schooner Mary Sally with 40 or 50 barrels of powder were brought out. The British took Papillon into service under her existing name. Then on 5 September Vanguard captured the French navy's schooner Courier de Nantes, of two guns and four swivel guns. She had a crew of 15 men under the command of an enseigne de vaisseau, and was carrying 30 barrels of flour to Saint-Marc. (Note: Vanguard had a ship's tender named Growler, perhaps a renamed prize, that shared in the prize money for Trois Amis and Courier de Nantes.)

Vanguard captured the American schooner Independence on 16 November. Six days later Vanguard took the two French schooners Rosalle, laden with saltpeter and lignum vitae, and St Rosario.

Vanguard was paid off by the end of 1805. In 1807 she was repaired at Plymouth. On 16 November 1807 Leeds, of London, was returning to London from Petersburg when she was on shore on the Middle Ground. HMS Quail and boats from Vanguard were able to get Leeds off after she had been stuck for 36 hours.

Under the command of Captain Thomas Baker, Vanguard became the flagship of Rear Admiral Thomas Bertie in 1808. In 1812 she was made a prison ship at Plymouth and in 1814 she became a powder hulk. Vanguard was broken up in 1821.

== Legacy ==
The American investment firm Vanguard takes its name from HMS Vanguard after founder John Bogle chose the name from an antique book chronicling historical British naval achievements.
