= Hired armed cutter Albion =

History

United Kingdom
- In service: June 1803
- Out of service: February 1808

General characteristics
- Type: Cutter
- Tons burthen: 7924/94 (bm)
- Propulsion: Sails
- Sail plan: Cutter or schooner
- Armament: 6 guns

United Kingdom
- Name: Albion
- Namesake: Albion
- In service: May 1808
- Out of service: June 1812

General characteristics
- Type: Cutter
- Tons burthen: 7917/94 (bm)
- Propulsion: Sails
- Sail plan: Cutter or schooner
- Complement: 27
- Armament: 6 guns

During the period of the Napoleonic Wars, the British Royal Navy twice employed a vessel named His Majesty's hired armed cutter Albion, though these are probably the same vessel:

== First contract ==
Albion, of six guns and 7917/94 tons (bm), served under contract from June 1803 to February 1808.

On 24 June 1803 she was under the command of Lieutenant Mayson Wright when she captured the 4-gun privateer Marengo. Albion, with a crew of 27, was employed in raising men for the Royal Navy. Late in the afternoon she came upon a French privateer in the Channel and gave chase. By 5p.m. pursuer and quarry were within 50 yards and opened fire on each other. An hour and twenty minutes later, the privateer struck. She had had three men wounded; Albion had no casualties though she had taken some shots to her hull and had a gun dismounted. The privateer turned out to be Marengo, of four guns and a crew of 26 men under the command of "John Sieur Granger". Wright believed Marengo was a new vessel; in any case she was two days out of Cherbourg, and had made no captures. (Note: Marengo had been commissioned in 1801. In June 1803 she was under Jean-Pierre Granger with 26 men and 4 guns.) She had "Fly of Cowes" painted across her stern. Albion sent Marengo into Portsmouth.

Around the end of July Albion sent into Portsmouth Freunde, Haab, master, which had been sailing from Naples to Hambro In its next issue, Lloyd's List reported that Albion had sent into Portsmouth Friends Hope, from Naples to Hambro. The Naval Chronicle reported that Trende Haab, prize to Albion, Lieutenant Mayson Wright, had arrived at Portsmouth on 29 July.

On 15 January 1804, Albion under the command of Mason [sic] Wright, captured three gunvessels: Marengo, Tureen de Naab, and Mercurius.

On 24 November 1804, Albion joined in when the hired armed cutter Duke of Clarence sighted a large French lugger and set off in chase. The lugger's crew ran their boat on shore near Granville, Manche. Duke of Clarence sent a boat in to examine the lugger, which turned out to have a cargo of oysters and cider. As Duke of Clarence awaited her boat's return she hit a submerged rock with the result that she started to fill with water. Clements gave up on any attempt to recover the lugger as Albion came up to rescue him, his officers, and crew.

At some point in 1807 Wright left Albion to take command of the gun-brig Vixen.

Early in December 1807, Albion detained Martia Elizabeth, Betts, master, sailing from Lisbon to Hambro, and sent her into Falmouth. Albion also towed Lucy and Alida into Falmouth. Then on the 16th, Albion sent into Falmouth Vrow Seida, Sohoon, master, from Villaviciosa, Asturias.

In February 1808, Albion sent into Falmouth, Active, King, master, which had been sailing from St Ube's to Philadelphia.

== Second contract ==
Albion, of six guns and 7924/94 tons (bm), served under contract from May 1808 until June 1812. Mr. Alexander Watson was Albion's commander and she was based on the Jersey station.

By 1809, however, Albion was on the North Sea station. On 25 July 1809, under Watson's command, Albion captured Danish schooner No.3, Jergen Fast, master. That same day Albion, Quail, and Strenuous were in company when Albion captured Maria Catherina. On 1 August Catherine, a prize to Albion, arrived at Leith. Then on 3 September Albion captured the Danish schooner Fortuna, J.P. Anderson, master.

From 1810 to the end of her contract Albion remained under the command of Alexander Watson on The Downs station.

On 11 July, Albion captured Hoffnung, Folkert Placeg, master.
