= HMS Cruizer (1797) =

Sloop of the Royal Navy

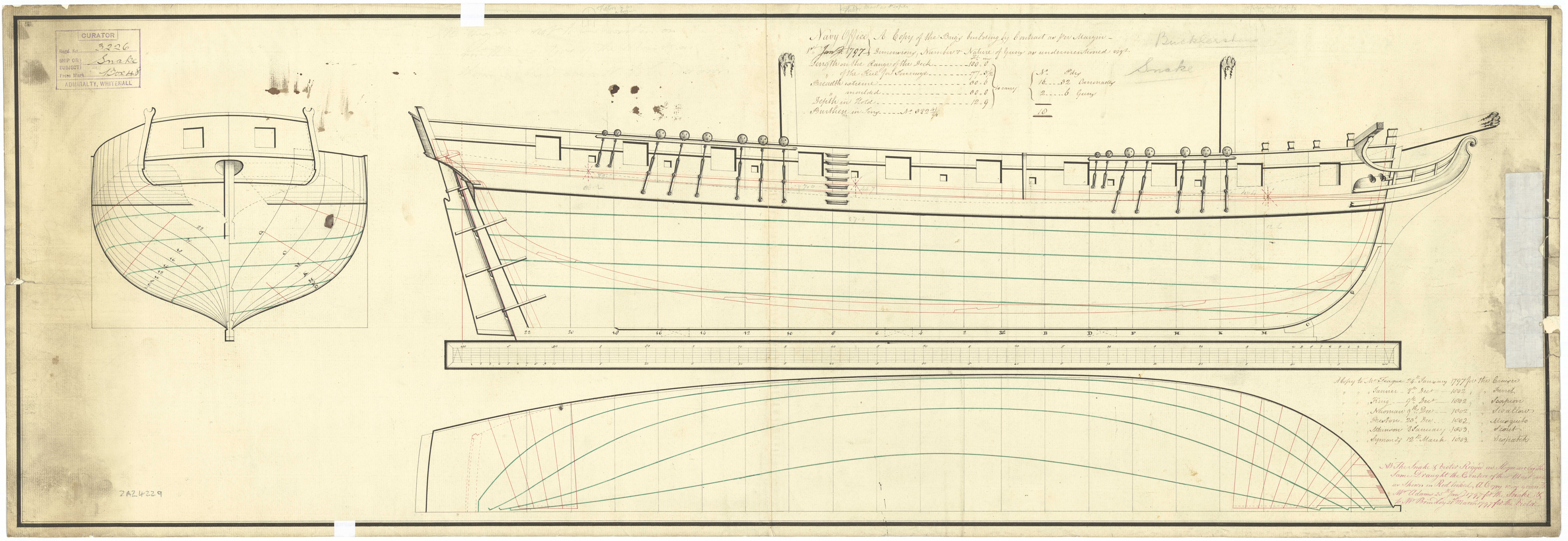
- Cruiser

History

Great Britain
- Name: HMS Cruizer
- Ordered: 19 December 1796
- Builder: Stephen Teague of Ipswich
- Laid down: February 1797
- Launched: 20 December 1797
- Commissioned: February 1798
- Out of service: Laid up in ordinary in November 1813.
- Honours and awards: Naval General Service Medal with clasps: "Copenhagen"; "Cruizer 1 Novr. 1808"
- Fate: Sold for breaking 3 February 1819

General characteristics
- Class & type: Cruizer-class brig-sloop
- Type: Rated for 18 guns
- Tons burthen: 38241/94 (bm)
- Length: 100 ft 0 in (30.5 m) (gundeck); 77 ft 3 1/2 in (23.6 m) (keel)
- Beam: 30 ft 6 in (9.3 m)
- Depth of hold: 12 ft 9 in (3.9 m)
- Sail plan: Brig rigged
- Complement: 121
- Armament: As built: 18 × 6-pounder guns; Later: 16 × 32-pounder carronades + 2 × 6-pounder chase guns

HMS Cruizer (often Cruiser) was a Royal Navy Cruizer-class brig-sloop built by Stephen Teague of Ipswich and launched in 1797. She was the first ship of the class, but there was a gap of 5 years between her launch and the ordering of the next batch in October 1803; by 1815 a total of 105 other vessels had been ordered to her design. She had an eventful wartime career, mostly in the North Sea, English Channel and the Baltic, and captured some 15 privateers and warships, and many merchant vessels. She also participated in several actions. She was laid up in 1813 and the Commissioners of the Navy sold her for breaking in 1819.

== Design ==
Cruizer was a prototype brig-rigged sloop-of-war designed in 1796 by Sir William Rule, the Surveyor of the Navy. Her hull was identical to the Snake-class ship-sloop, but she carried a pair of square-rigged masts instead of the three masts fitted in the Snake class. The original design had an armament of eighteen 6-pounder long guns but it was soon decided to replace the broadside weapons with sixteen 32-pounder carronades, leaving two 6-pounders as chase guns. The net effect was to increase the broadside weight of shot massively, at the cost of reducing her broadside's effective range. (Note: This was an innovation that the Royal Navy favoured at the turn of the 19th century for many small vessels.) This mix became the pattern for all the other, later members of her class.

== Construction ==
Cruizer was ordered by the Admiralty on 19 December 1796 to be built in the commercial yard of Stephen Teague at Ipswich. (Note: The use of commercial ship yards for building the smaller vessels of the Royal Navy was normal practice of the time.) She was laid down in February 1797 and launched on 20 December the same year.

== Service history ==
Commander Charles Wollaston commissioned her in February 1798 for the North Sea.

=== North Sea (1798 – 1800) ===
On 27 March 1798 Cruizer captured the French privateer lugger Jupiter after a three-hour chase. Jupiter had eight guns and a crew of 36 men. She was 14 days into her cruise from Boulogne.

On 4 and 5 May Cruizer was among the vessels that captured 12 outward-bound Greenland ships. The other vessels included the hired armed cutters Fox, and Marshall Cobourg, and Jalouse, though most were much larger and included Monmouth, Glatton, Ganges, Director, America, among others. Cruizer shared with Apollo, Lutine, and the hired armed cutter Rose in the proceeds from the capture on 13 May of the Houismon, Welfart, and Ouldst Kendt. (Note: A seaman's share of the prize money was worth 4s 6d.)

Then on 19 May, Cruizer was six or seven leagues SE by S off Lowestoff when she encountered two French privateer luggers. During the chase one lost her main and foremast and struck. Cruizer continued in chase of the other until 5 pm when it became clear that the quarry was gaining, and Wollaston was losing sight of the lugger that had struck. He therefore gave up the chase and returned to the first lugger. She was Chasseur, from Honfleur, and had been out eight days without taking anything. She was armed with four 6-pounder guns and had a crew of 48 men. The lugger that escaped was Dragon, of four 6-pounder guns. The two luggers had left Honfleur together and were going to cruise the Dogger Bank.

In August Cruizer captured the Dutch Greenlandsmen Fortuna, Jacob Sroertjes, master, and Endraght, Claas Boertjes, master.

Cruizer shared with Latona, Astraea, and the hired armed cutter Courier in the proceeds from the capture on 16 April 1799 of the Prussian hoy Dolphin. That same day Cruizer captured Commerce, Christiansen, master. Cruizer was a part of Admiral Lord Duncan's fleet on 21 April and shared in the proceeds of the capture of Harmonie.

Cruizer shared with Scorpion, and the hired armed cutters Fox and Hazard in the proceeds of the capture on 24 April 1799 of the Swedish brig Neptunus. Two days later, Scorpion and Cruizer captured Adelaide, Bose, late master.

On 12 May Cruizer captured Vrow Etje, Meertens, master. (Note: A seaman's share of the prize money was worth 1s 9d.) Cruizer shared the proceeds with Ranger and Pylades. Four days later Cruizer captured Reformator, Scheepens, master.

Also between 8 March and 12 May, Cruizer captured several other small Dutch vessels. (Note: Prize money was paid in November 1811. A first-class share was worth £73 2s 8d; a fifth-class share, that of a seaman, was worth 9s 8 1/4d.)

On 21 May Cruiser was south of St Abb's Head when at 11 am she sighted two luggers further south. Wollaston set off after them, but the weather was too unsettled for him to keep them continually in sight. Still, by correctly estimating where they were headed he was able to catch up by 4:30, only to have a sudden gust of wind take away Cruizer's main-top-gallant-mast. Cruizer was not able to catch up with them again until 9 p.m. Wollaston was not able to close and lost sight of them again. However, at daylight, as Cruizer was about two or three leagues off Scarborough Castle, Wollaston again sighted one of the luggers about eight miles away. After a six-hour chase, Cruizer captured the privateer, which turned out to be Deux Freres, Captain Jacques Bellet, 14 guns (12 of which she had thrown overboard during the chase), and 50 men. She was from Calais and had been cruising since 16 April. Captain Bellet informed Wollaston that the second lugger was Tipoo Sahib, of 12 guns. Tipoo Sahib had thrown all her guns and her boat overboard during the chase and had gone either to France or Norway. (Note: Tipoo Sahib was named for Tipu Sultan, the ruler of the Kingdom of Mysore, who was an ally of Frances and an enemy of the British. In fact, Tipu Sultan had died on 4 May, defending his fort at Srirangapatna.) Wollaston decided that as 26 of his crew were away in prizes, and he had 50 prisoners on board, that he would come into Yarmouth to land the prisoners before returning to his station.

Cruizer continued operating in the North Sea, capturing the privateer Courageux on 13 July after a chase of three hours. Courageaux carried 14 guns and a crew of 47 men. She was six weeks out of Dunkirk. During her cruise she had captured four vessels, one of which Cruizer had recaptured the evening before. On 25 August Cruizer captured Catharina Magdalena, Ahrens, master.

Cruizer captured the 14-gun French privateer Perseverant on 23 March 1800. Cruizer had been boarding two brigs when she sighted a suspicious sail to the east. Cruizer gave chase and after five hours succeeded in capturing the French privateer cutter Perseverant. Perseverant was armed with 14 guns and had a crew of 47 men under the command of Captain Delattre. Wollaston described her as "a remarkably fine Vessel, copper-bottomed, and has captured an amazing Number of Vessels in the North Sea." On this cruise, Perseverant was 20 days out of Dunkirk, having stopped at the Texel for two days, but had not captured anything.

Two days later Cruizer captured the 14-gun Filibustier. Cruizer had been boarding a brig from Bremen, whose master reported that three hours earlier a French privateer steering to the NE had hailed him. Cruizer immediately set of in chase and by eight-thirty had caught up with and captured the privateer. Flibustier had a crew of 54 men under the command of Captain Cany. She was only one day out of Dunkirk and had captured nothing.

Wollaston sent both Perseverant and Flibustier into Yarmouth.

On 22 May Cruizer and Pyllades captured Maria Charlotta, Backendorff, master.

In August, Cruizer detained Elizabeth, J. M. Farrer, master. Elizabeth was bound for Amsterdam and carried 25 hogsheads of sugar. Then on 18 September Cruizer captured Vertrouwen, Simons, master.

=== Copenhagen (1801) ===
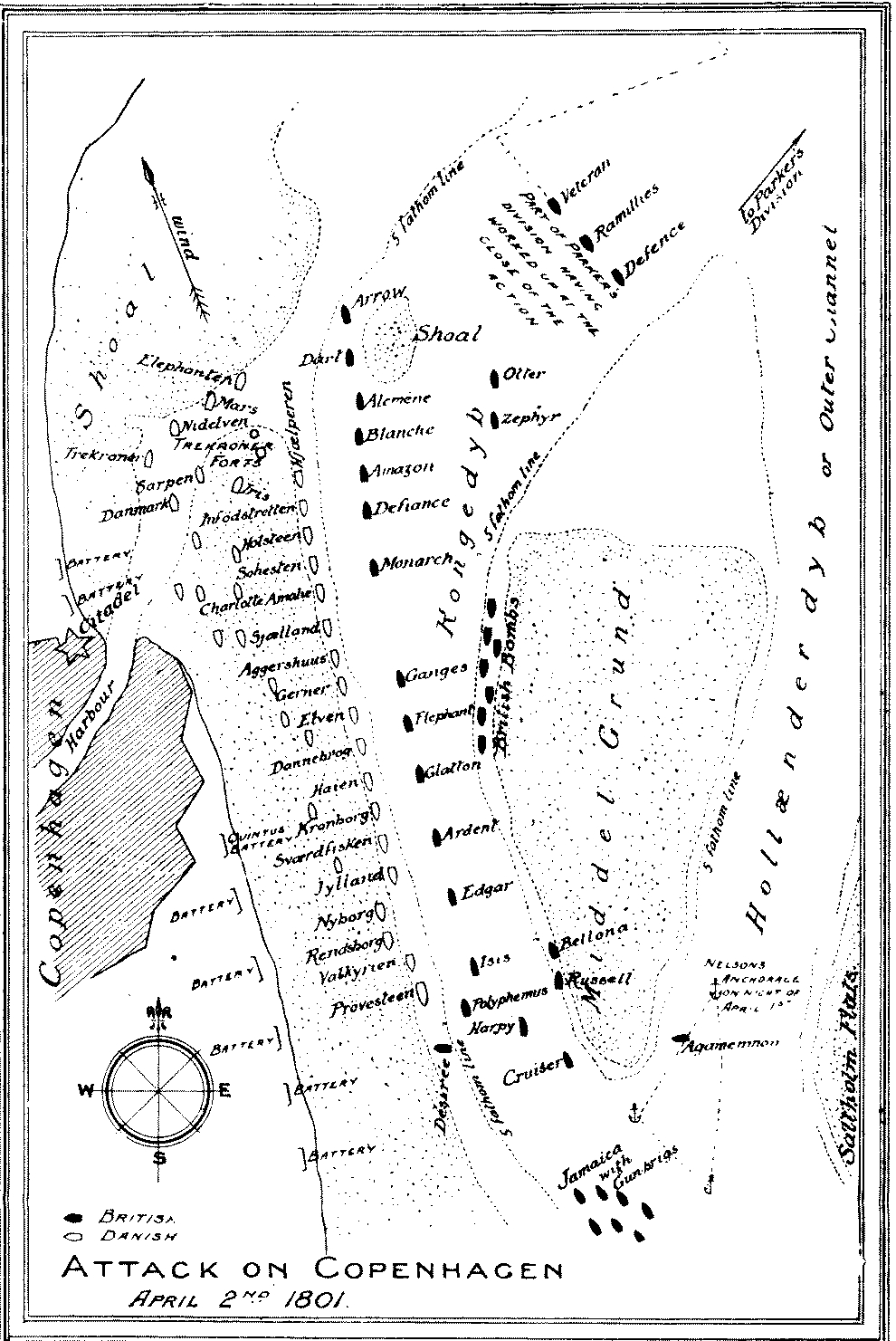
Plan of the battle of Copenhagen, showing the inner channel between Middelgrund. Cruizer (here labelled Cruiser) is shown to the south of Middelgrund

In January 1801 Commander James Brisbane recommissioned Cruizer. On 23 February she recaptured Aberdeen Packet, of Aberdeen, and Harriot, of Sunderland.

Cruizer was then assigned to Admiral Sir Hyde Parker's expedition to the Baltic, which had as its objective to compel the Danes to abandon the League of Armed Neutrality. In March Cruizer sailed with Parker's fleet from Yarmouth roads for Copenhagen.

On 30 March, prior to the battle, the boats and masters of Amazon and Cruizer placed buoys to mark the narrow channel between Saltholm and Middelgrund ("the Middle Ground" shoal), part of the waterway of Øresund between Copenhagen and Malmö. Brisbane impressed his immediate superior, Vice Admiral Nelson, with this work, and was promoted to post captain after the subsequent battle of Copenhagen. In 1847 the Admiralty awarded the Naval General Service Medal with clasp "Copenhagen" to all surviving claimants from the action.

In April, Commander John Hancock took command of Cruizer for the North Sea station. Cruizer, Zephyr, and Surprise shared in the proceeds of the capture on 1 October of Antonius, and the capture the next day of Jonge Jacob.

=== Blockade of the Netherlands (1803 – 1806) ===
Together with Jalouse and Immortalité, Cruizer captured two French armed vessels, the schooner Inabordable and the brig Commode on 14 June 1803 after they had run aground under the guns of a shore battery for protection. After about an hour's firing by the batteries, the British sloops, and the French gun-vessels, the boats were able to take possession and refloat the two gun-vessels. Each of the French gun-vessels was armed with three 24-pounder guns and one 8-pounder gun. Later reports described the two French vessels as gun-brigs, and gave their names as Inabordable, and Mechanté. The Royal Navy did not take either into service. (Note: Both were Ardente-class chaloupes-canonnièr of 130 tons (French) displacement. Mechanté had been launched 17 June 1793 at Boulogne; Inabordable had been launched 12 August 1793 at Calais.)

Chiffonne, Ethalion, and Cruizer shared in the capture of Flore on 5 August 1803. The same three vessels shared the salvage money arising from the recapture on the same day of Margaret, Robert Lacs, master.

Boats from Cruizer and Rattler cut out the 4-gun cutter Colombe from Sluis on the night of 8 March 1804. Unfortunately Colombe grounded and when the cutting-out party was unable to free her, they set her on fire to prevent her recapture.

Later that month Cruizer and Rattler were anchored off Blankenberge; 13 armed vessels carried troops from the shore with the intention of boarding, but they were beaten back until the shallow water and the guns of the Ostend batteries prevented further chase.

Later in 1804 Cruizer was used as the inshore vessel in the blockade of Flushing, and as part of her duties she was required to report the movements of vessels in and around the harbour to the officer in command of the operation, Captain Sir Sidney Smith of Antelope. On 15 May 1804 Cruizer reported 22 vessels sailing from Ostend. By morning it was apparent that a flotilla of 59 vessels, comprising prams, schooners, and schuyts, had sailed from Flushing and was making its way along the shallow coastal waters to Ostend. Cruizer and Rattler attacked that afternoon, just as the wind changed and forced the Dutch vessels to turn back for Flushing. The frigates Penelope and Antelope attacked the leading vessels, and Aimable was sent to assist Cruizer and Rattler in dealing with the rearmost vessels. The British were surrounded by a host of small vessels, and operating in shallow water. The engagement lasted six hours, and Cruizer lost one man killed and three wounded. Much damage was done to the Flushing flotilla, although more sailors were killed in trying to destroy the grounded vessels over the next few days than were lost in the engagement. Antelope, Rattler, and Cruizer shared in the proceeds of the capture on 16 May of Dutch schuyt No. 98.

Cruizer captured the French privateer Contre Amiral Magon on 16 October 1804 after a chase of 100 miles. The gun-brig Bold, the hired armed brig Ann, and cutter Florence were also in company but fell behind in the chase. The French brig, under the command of Captain Blauckman, surrendered without a fight after Cruizer sent three warning shots from her 32-pounder carronades. (Note: Blauckman was a highly successful privateer captain, also known as Blankman and Blakeman, among other variants. During the French Revolutionary Wars he had been captain of the privateers Anacreon, Bellone, and Chasseur. This was the fourth time the British had captured him.) She was quite new and on her first cruise. She was pierced for 18 guns but mounted 17: fourteen 6-pounder guns, two 18-pounder carronades, and one 9-pounder gun. Her crew of 84 men consisted of Frenchmen, Danes, Swedes, and Americans. Of the 67 men aboard, 19 being away in prizes, seven of the Americans promptly joined the crew of Cruizer.

Contre-Amiral Magnon had been out from Dunkirk 18 days and had captured the ship Belisarius, of Newcastle, the brig Scipio, and Content's Increase. The last two had cargoes of coal and the privateer had sent them straight into Dunkirk. A British naval brig had recaptured Belisarius within two hours of her capture. The masters of all three British vessels, together with their crews, some 20 men in all, were on Contre Amiral Magon at the time of her capture and Cruizer took them on board. Cruizer sent Contre-Amiral Magon into Yarmouth where soon afterwards she was wrecked by being driven on shore. Her crew were sent to prison, but Captain Blauckman remained aboard Monmouth. He managed to escape and shortly thereafter returned to Dunkirk.

On 23 October 1804 Cruizer and her accompanying gun-brigs were in again action off Ostend with two small praams and eighteen schuyts. Shallow water allowed the French to retreat as the tide fell and the gun-brig Conflict grounded due to the fault of her pilot. Her crew abandoned her but later returned together with men from Cruizer, the hired armed cutters Admiral Mitchell, and Griffin, and some of the other ships in the squadron to try to recapture or destroy her. The cutting-out expedition was unsuccessful, with Cruizer suffering four officers and men wounded, Conflict losing one man killed and five wounded, and Griffin having two men wounded in the attempt.

The next year continued to be a busy time on blockade for Cruizer as she was in action 104 times with various enemy ships, coastal batteries and privateers.

On 11 February 1805 Cruizer and Ann captured Hoop, Mailer, master. (Note: A seaman's share of the prize money was £2 5s 6 1/2d.)

On 8 March Cruizer captured the galiot Triton and recaptured Vriendschap. Cruizer shared with Minx and Bold in the proceeds of the capture seven days later of Industria, Labea, master. (Note: A seaman's share of the prize money was £1 18s 2 1/2d.) Cruizer's crew did a little better from the capture on 20 June of Johanna Tbolen. (Note: A seaman's share of the prize money was £2 8s 6 3/4d.)

Earlier, on 5 June, Cruizer was in company with the hired cutter Active and brig Ann, and the brigs Minx, and Mariner when they captured Dogter Catherina.

Cruizer was again in company with Ann on 2 August 1805 when they captured Frederick. Then on 22 August they captured Susannah Margaretha. (Note: A seaman's share of the prize money was 7s 1 3/4d.) Cruizer, Active, Mariner, and Minx shared in the proceeds of the detention on 5 September of Sophia Amelia. Cruizer, Minx, and Mariner were in company and shared with Griper and Earnest in the proceeds of the recapture on 29 September of Rover, of Newcastle, Hillary, master. (Note: A seaman's share of the prize money was 3s 1d.)

On 13 November Cruizer intercepted two French pirate luggers attempting to take a brig. Hancock chased them and after two hours captured Vengeur after his bow guns brought down the lugger's main topsail and main-lug sail. Vengeur was under the command of Jean Augustin Hirrel, carried a crew of 56 men, and was armed with 14 guns. She was two days out of Boulogne and had that day taken two Swedish brigs, one laden with salt, from Liverpool, the other from Boston, in Lincolnshire, in ballast. (Note: A seaman's share of the prize money was 16s 5d.)

On 27–8 January 1806 captured "sundry Smuggling Vessels". Hancock decoyed a number of smugglers off shore by disguising his ship as an American. He captured one cutter, which he used as a tender. He then sailed Cruizer and the cutter in the direction he thought most of the smugglers had sailed. Next morning he found four luggers and a cutter within easy reach and proceeded to capture them too. The tender captured two luggers, each with 1000 tubs of geneva, rum, and the like. In all, the haul included 26,000 gallons of spirits and a large quantity of tobacco, plus other contraband. The proceeds amounted to £2236 19s 7d, which the officers and crew shared. Despite this singular success against the smugglers, when Cruiser returned to port Hancock had to turn over command of Cruiser to Commander Pringle Stoddart. Unfortunately for Hancock, the battle of Trafalgar had taken place a few months earlier. The battle had resulted on 21 January in a great many promotions in Admiral Lord Nelson's fleet, with a number of the beneficiaries displacing Hancock in the list of candidates for promotion.

=== Baltic (1807-1810) ===
At 8 am on 6 January, Cruizer was eight leagues south of the Galloper when she sighted a suspicious lugger heading for the coast of Flanders. Cruiser gave chase and after four hours caught up with and captured the French privateer Iėna. Iéna was armed with sixteen 3 and 4-pounder guns, two of which she had thrown overboard during the chase. She was a new vessel, only 14 days out of the stocks, and was under the command of M. Morel. She had captured three English vessels on 1 and 2 January some seven leagues from Flamborough Head. A gale had separated Felicity of Yarmouth, Neptune of Sunderland, and Bee of Kikaldy from the Baltic convoy they had been part of, resulting in their vulnerability. The masters and crew of all three were aboard Iena; Stoddard thought that there was a good chance the Royal Navy would recapture the three as they and the privateer had tried to enter port at Gorée, only to be chased away by a frigate and a cutter. The Royal Navy took Iėna into service as HMS Grenada.

On her way from Walcheren towards the Galloper Shoal in the North Sea, on 26 January 1807, Cruizer spotted the 16-gun privateer lugger Braave (or Brave) and, after a long chase, drove her onto the beach three miles west of Blankenberge. The captain and much of the crew then fled ashore. Cruizer's boats captured the privateer under musket fire and brought her off. Cruizer freed the masters and crew of the Tyne collier brig Leander, and of an English galiot carrying government rum, who were prisoners aboard Brave. Cruizer recaptured Leander the same afternoon, as well as Guardian, of Bridlington. Guardian was one of five vessels, including four from the Baltic, that the French privateer Revanche had captured off Flamborough Head.

Around this time Cruizer captured two fishing vessels, St. Would Beloop and Fortuyn. On 2 March, Cruizer recaptured the Danish ship Familien.

From August 1807 Cruizer formed part of Admiral Gambier's inshore squadron for the second battle of Copenhagen. On 23 August, Cruizer was part of the advance squadron, which took up position near the entrance to the harbour. An engagement of four hours ensued between the squadron and the Danes, who marshaled the Crown Battery, floating batteries, three praams of 20 guns each, some 30 gunboats, and block ships. The shallowness of the water prevent the Royal Navy from bringing in any large ships to support the advance squadron of brigs, sloops, and ketches. Eventually the British withdrew. Lieutenant Woodford of Cruizer was among the dead, and the only casualty from Cruizer.

Commander George M'Kenzie took command later in 1807.

Astraea, Agamemnon, and Cruizer shared the proceeds of the detention during August of the Danish merchant vessels Anne and Catherine, Anne and Margaret, and Three Brothers. Banterer, Kite, hired armed cutter Joseph, and Whiting shared with Cruizer in the proceeds of Twee Gebruders. (Note: A seaman's share of the prize money for Anne and Catherine, Anne and Margaret, and Three Brothers was 5 1/2d. A seaman's share of the prize money for Twee Gebruders was 9 1/2d.)

Cruizer and Kite shared in the capture on 20 August of the William August, Thuren, master. That same day Cruizer and Kite captured Patriot, Thomson, master. Eleven days later, Cruizer captured Mary. Two days later Cruizer captured Emanuel.

Cruizer shared with Dictator and Prometheus in the capture on 16 April 1808, of a Danish mail boat. The mail boat was carrying, inter alia, foreign gold, silver, copper coins, Holstein and Sleswick paper notes, and £2000.

Cruizer was in company with Euryalus, Captain George Dundas, in the Great Belt when on 11 June they discovered several vessels at anchor close to shore at the entrance to the river Naskon. Dundas anchored at dark and sent a cutting out party in four boats from the two ships to destroy the vessels. The cutting out party burnt two large troop transports and retrieved a gun-vessel armed with two 18-pounders and carrying 64 men. The successful foray took place directly under the guns of a Danish battery of three 18-pounder guns and numerous enemy troops who lined the shore. The enemy lost seven men killed (and possibly a number drowned), and twelve wounded; the British had one man slightly wounded. In 1817 the crews of the British ships received prize money for "Danish gun-boat E". (Note: A first-class share of the hull, stores, and head money was worth £72 11s 5d; a fifth-class share, that of a seaman, was worth 7s 2 1/4d.)

Cruizer recaptured Mary on 31 August.

On 1 November, Cruizer was under the command of Lieutenant Thomas Wells (acting). She was off Gothenburg when 20 gunboats attacked her; she captured a schuyt of ten 4-pounder guns and 32 men, and drove off the others, which took refuge at Læsø. (Note: Some accounts give the date as 1 October.) On 16 November Wells wrote to his wife Nancy that she should buy a weekly paper to see his letter describing his capture. His feat resulted in Well's promotion to the rank of commander some weeks later. In 1847 the Admiralty awarded the Naval General Service Medal with clasp "Cruizer 1 Novr. 1808" to all surviving claimants from the action.

Wells was still a lieutenant and acting captain when between 1 and 9 November Cruizer captured the Danish vessels Rinaldo, Proben, Trende Brodre, and Kirstina.

Cruizer shared with the bomb-vessel Hearty in the proceeds of the salvage arising from the recapture on 2 November of the Maria Elizabeth. Cruizer and Fury shared in the proceeds of the capture on 23 November of Fier Broders, J. Eynerson, master. Starling, Cruizer, Alexandrine [sic] (probably Alexandria), and Fury shared in the proceeds of the capture, also on 23 November, of the Danish ships Vrow Sophia and Yonge Nessa. On 6 December seven Danish vessels arrived at Yarmouth. They were prizes to Cruizer, Starling, and Rose.

Two days later, Cruizer captured the Danish vessels Erndre, Prince Charles, Aurora, Lawrence Caroline, and Two Brothers. Apparently that same day Cruizer also captured Jonge Ness, Vrou Sophia, Johannes, and Elbe. Starling, Cruizer, Alexandrine, and Fury shared in the proceeds of the capture, also on 25 November, of the Danish ships Salskabed and St. Jorrison. Other vessels that Cruizer captured between 22 and 25 November were Fier Brodre, Maria Elizabeth, and Speculation. Cruizer shared with Hearty in the proceeds from the capture of Fier Brodre. On 25 November Cruizer also captured the Danish vessels Prince Charles, Aurora, Ernize, Lawrence Caroline, and Two Brothers.

On 26 November 1808 Commander Thomas Richard Toker replaced Wells. (Note: For more on Thomas Richard Toker see: O'Byrne, William R. (1849). "Toker, Thomas Richard" . A Naval Biographical Dictionary. London: John Murray.)

In March and April 1809 Cruizer captured five prizes. On 13 March she captured Albion. The next day she captured Printz Frederick and Erstotning. On 21 March it was Unge Maria's turn to fall prey. Orion, Superb, Tartar, and Cruizer shared in the proceeds of the capture on 8 April of Vergnugen and Gustaff. On 9 April Cruizer captured St. Johannes. Cruizer shared with Tartar, Superb, and Orion in the proceeds of the capture that same day of Caroline. The same four British vessels shared in the capture, two days later, of the Danish sloop Brigetta and the Prussian galiot Erwaftnung. Lastly, on 27 April Cruizer captured Lille Peder.

On 7 May Cruizer was off Baltiysk (then called Pillau), with a letter for Louis Drusina (also known as Heinrich Hahn), a secret agent who had previously been British Consul. Cruizer shared with Urgent in the proceeds of the salvage of Experiment, Becker, master, on 8 May. The next day Cruizer was in company with Urgent when they captured the French privateer cutter Tilsit, of ten guns and 41 men.

Cruizer captured the 6-gun Danish Christianborg on 31 May 1809. She had a crew of 37 men, but 13 were away in a boat that another British warship had captured. Of her six guns, Christianborg had throw three overboard in an unsuccessful attempt to gain speed. She was only six hours out of Earthholms (55°19′30″N 15°11′39″E) and had not captured anything. Cruizer was in company with Rose.

On 30 May 1810, Cruizer captured Hercules. Then on 19 June Cruizer captured the Danish galiot Frau Magdalena, and the Prussian sloop Jonge Laura, on 26 June. On 12 July Cruizer captured Jonge Johannes Next, on 13 July, Cruizer captured the Danish sloop Zwey Gebroeders while Woodlark was in sight. Two days later Cruizer captured the hoy Elizabeth (or Jonge Elizabeth). Then a week later, on 22 July, Cruizer captured the Swedish hoy Concordia.

In September and October, Cruizer brought four prizes (Schwan, Blanch, Albertina, and Byie) into Hull. She had captured the Prussian sloop Schwan on 31 July, the Dutch galiot Familiens Well on 17 September, and Albersina on 21 August. Cruizer shared the capture of Albersina with Cheerful.

Around this time Cruizer shared with a number of vessels in the capture of Aeolus, Zubeck, master; Jonge Pieter, Musterdt, master; Jusrow Alyda, Pottjewit, master; Ferwagting, Dirks, Master; Vinnern, Paulsen, master; and the Almindeligheden, Watzes, master; Neptunus, Hanses, master; Sen Soskende, Barnholdt, master; Bornholm, Junge, master; Fabius, Desvertiey, master; Zee Star, Muller, master; and Frou Eagle, Rotjer, master.

She was in Yarmouth and the Nore in January 1811, refitted in Chatham in November 1811, and was in Portsmouth in February 1812.

Toker was appointed to post captain on 4 December 1813.

== Fate ==
Cruizer was laid up in ordinary at Sheerness in November 1813.

The Commissioners of His Majesty's Navy gave notice that the "Cruizer brig, of 384 tons", lying at Sheerness, would be offered for sale on 3 February 1819. Mr Job Cockshot bought Cruizer for £960 on 3 February for breaking up.
