= Hired armed brig Ann =

There were two, and possibly three, vessels named His Majesty's hired armed brig Ann (or Anne) that served the British Royal Navy. The first participated in an engagement in 1807 that would earn her crew the Naval General Service Medal. She is sometimes referred to in sources as the hired armed cutter Ann or the hired armed brig Anne. Little or nothing is known of the second and third hired armed brigs Ann or Anne.

== First hired armed brig Ann ==
The first hired armed brig Ann served the Royal Navy from 21 May 1804 to 28 July 1809. She was of 12056/94 tons (bm) and carried ten 12-pounder carronades.

=== Prize taking ===
In June 1804 Ann was under the command of Lieutenant John Sherriff. Later that year she was in company with Cruizer when Cruizer captured the French privateer Contre Amiral Magon on 16 October 1804. The gun-brig Bold and the hired armed cutter Florence were also in company. The French brig was under the command of Captain Blauckman, was newly built and on her first cruise. She was pierced for 18 guns but mounted 17, fourteen 6-pounder guns, two 18-pounder carronades, and one 9-pounder gun. Her crew of 84 men consisted of Frenchmen, Danes, Swedes, and Americans. She had been out from Dunkirk 18 days and had captured several vessels:

- The ship Belisarius, of Newcastle, commanded by Matthew Hunter, on 3 October, off Tynemouth
- The brig Scipio, commanded by Richard Robertson;
- The Content's Increase, commanded by George Bell.

The last two had cargoes of coal and the privateer had sent them straight into Dunkirk. A Royal Navy brig had recaptured Belisarius within two hours of her capture. The masters of all three British vessels, together with their crews, some 20 men in all, were on Contre Amiral Magon at the time of her capture and Cruizer took them on board.

Then on 31 March 1805 Ann was again in company with Bold when they captured Neptune. On 5 June Ann and others captured Dogter Catharina. Ann was again in company with Cruizer on 2 August 1805 when they captured Frederick. Then on 22 August 1805 they captured Susannah Margaretha.

=== Medal action ===
In 1807 Ann was under the command Lieutenant James MacKenzie (or M'Kenzie). On 20 November 1807 she captured the Spanish privateer lugger Vensejo (or Venzego or Vinsigo). Vensejo was pierced for 14 guns, but only mounted six 4-pounder guns and one long 12-pounder. She had a crew of 45 men, was eight days out of Ferrol and had not made any captures. MacKenzie took off her crew and put a prize crew of nine men aboard her but kept her with him.

On the morning of 24 November 1807, at about 9 a.m., Ann was sailing in the Straits of Gibraltar when she observed 10 gunboats coming towards her and Vensejo. The leading gunboat raised Spanish colours at 10 a.m. and opened fire. The wind was too weak to permit the two British vessels to escape so MacKenzie prepared for action. Two more gunboats came up with the first and opened fire.

Vensejo struck at half-past ten, having signaled that she had three dead of her crew of nine. By 11 a.m. Ann had dismasted one gunboat and two others had struck. However, MacKenzie did not try to take possession as he had only 30 men of his crew aboard Ann, but had 42 prisoners and dispatches. Ann then engaged five gunboats that had taken possession of Vensejo. The Spanish attempted to close with and board Ann but MacKenzie used his sweeps to manoeuvre her, thus maintaining fire on them. At 1 p.m. the Spanish departed, taking Vensejo with them. Although six of the largest Spanish gunboats had been within pistol-shot of Ann for an hour and a half, she had no casualties.

In 1847 the Admiralty awarded any surviving claimants the Naval General Service Medal with a clasp that commemorated the vessel's name and the date of the action, however no one came forward to collect it. MacKenzie in particular died within two years of the action. The Admiralty had promoted him to commander for his role in the engagement and in 1809 appointed him to command of the Cruizer-class brig-sloop Foxhound. While returning from Halifax, Nova Scotia Foxhound foundered in the Atlantic in August 1809 with the loss of her entire crew.

== Second hired armed brig Ann ==
This vessel served from 15 July 1809 to 17 October 1809. She was of 77 tons burthen.

== Third hired armed brig Anne ==
There exists a record of a hired armed brig Anne that served from 1810 to 1813 under the command of Lieutenant J. Williams.
