= Lita de Ranitz =

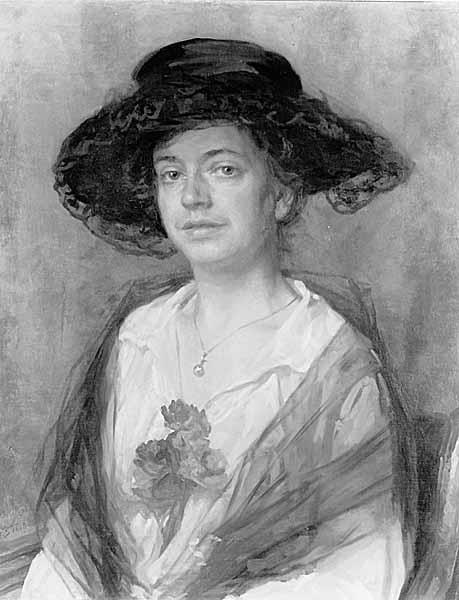
- Lita de Ranitz, painted by her husband in 1923.
- Born: Willemine Elisabeth Edzardine de Ranitz; 4 March 1876; The Hague
- Died: 21 July 1960 (aged 84); Amsterdam
- Other name: W.E.E. Tholen-De Ranitz
- Occupation: Art collector
- Known for: Dollhouse collection
- Spouse: Willem Bastiaan Tholen (m. 1919)

Willemine Elisabeth Edzardine (Lita) de Ranitz (4 March 1876 – 21 July 1960) was a Dutch art collector. Her collection of dollhouses and related items is now in the Historical Museum of the Hague.

== Early life ==
Lita de Ranitz was born in The Hague, daughter of Sebastiaan Mattheus Sigismund de Ranitz and Hermanne Louise Christine Thomassen à Thuessink van der Hoop.

== Dollhouse collection ==
Lita de Ranitz built her dollhouse collection from an early age, and continued to add to it through her travels, and by commissioning special items from craftsmen. Her husband and other artists made tiny original paintings for her collection. Her younger sister Anna embroidered tiny but elaborate rugs and curtains to contribute. She exhibited her most elaborate dollhouse in 1910 and 1911, and Queen Emma was among the guests attending the show.

== Personal life ==
Lita de Ranitz married Dutch artist Willem Bastiaan Tholen in 1919, as his second wife. She was widowed in 1931. She died in 1960, aged 84 years, in Amsterdam. Her collection was donated to the Costume Museum in The Hague, and after 1984 it became part of the holdings of the Historical Museum of the Hague, and were the focus of a 2018 exhibit.
