= Pram (ship) =

Type of flat-bottomed ship

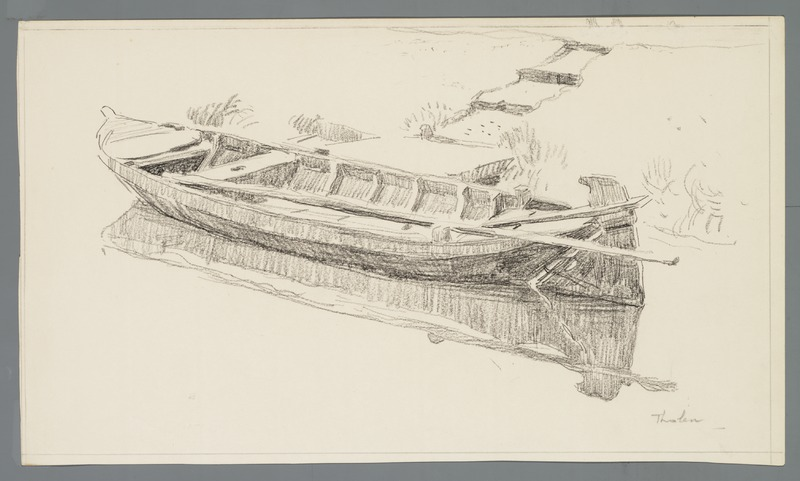
W.B. Tholen, pram, collection of the Zuiderzee Museum

A pram or pramm describes a type of shallow-draught flat-bottomed barge or ship, typically intended for shallow waterways or canals. They are usually propelled by pushing the ship through the water using a setting pole, although sailing prams also exist.

The name pram derives from the Latin premere ("press [verb]").

There is also an unrelated type of boat called "pram".

== History ==
Prams were often used to transport agricultural cargo or cattle through shallow canals and wetlands in Europe. For example, in the Netherlands they were used to transport peat. Prams could vary in design and construction, often being built to a local style, but in order to navigate these canals and shallow waters, they were typically shallow-draughted and flat bottomed. Most prams were propelled using long poles, called a barge or setting pole today, which was used to physically push the craft through the water. The basic design of the pram, alongside other river and canal boat types, made them particularly useful on canals or rivers.

=== Armed Prams ===
Though not intended as warships, prams have been used as gunboats or floating batteries during times of stress. During the Great Northern War, some prams were converted to floating batteries to support amphibious assaults. Prams were also used during the Russo-Turkish War (1787–1792), being listed among some of the vessels constructed for the Dnieper Flotilla in 1787-88.

During the Napoleonic Wars, France started a program to construct Fully-rigged "artillery prams" for the Armee d'Angleterre during the planned invasion of the United Kingdom. These ships were well armed, but had poor sailing characteristics and struggled in the English Channel. The program was abandoned in 1804 or 1805, with only a few prams built. Though these were called prams (Prame in French), they shared only a few features in common with other prams.

== Gallery ==
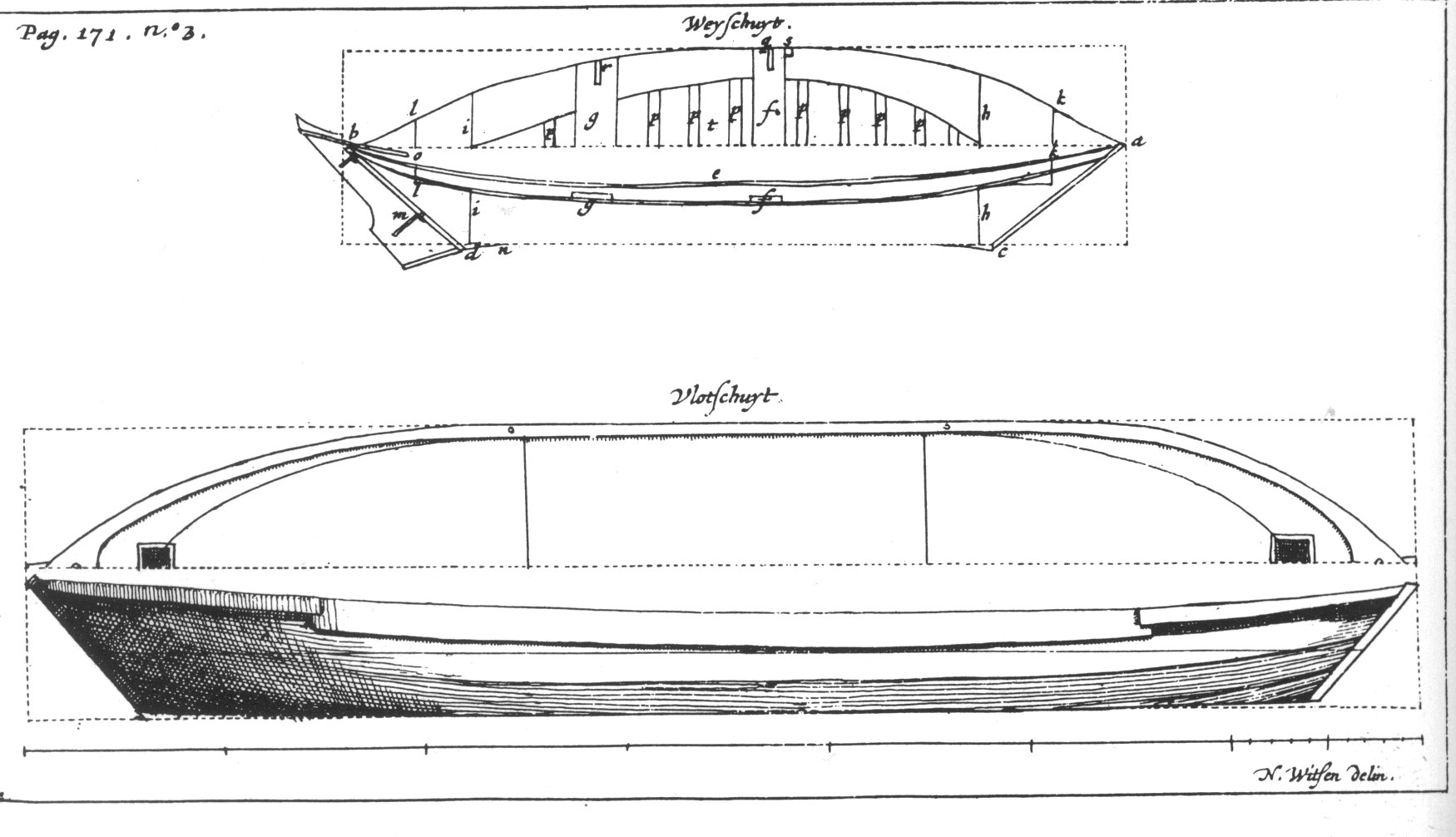
Drawing of a 17th-century pram by Nicolaes Witsen

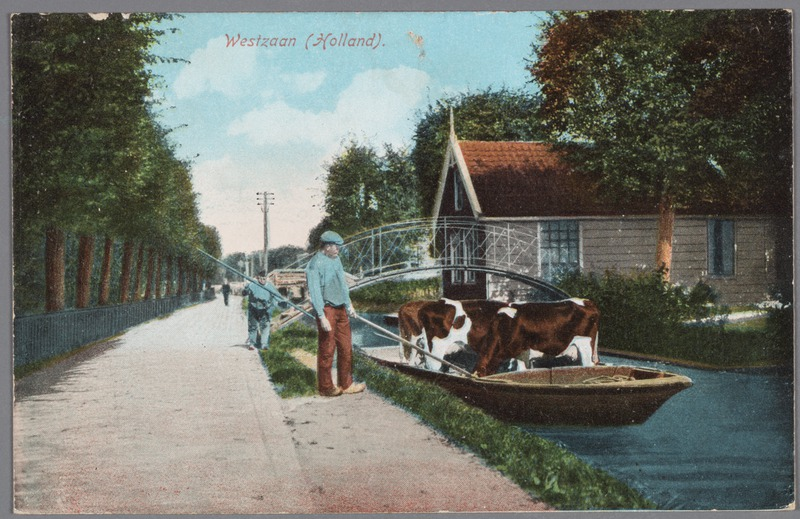
A pram in use, cultural heritage collection, Zuiderzee Museum

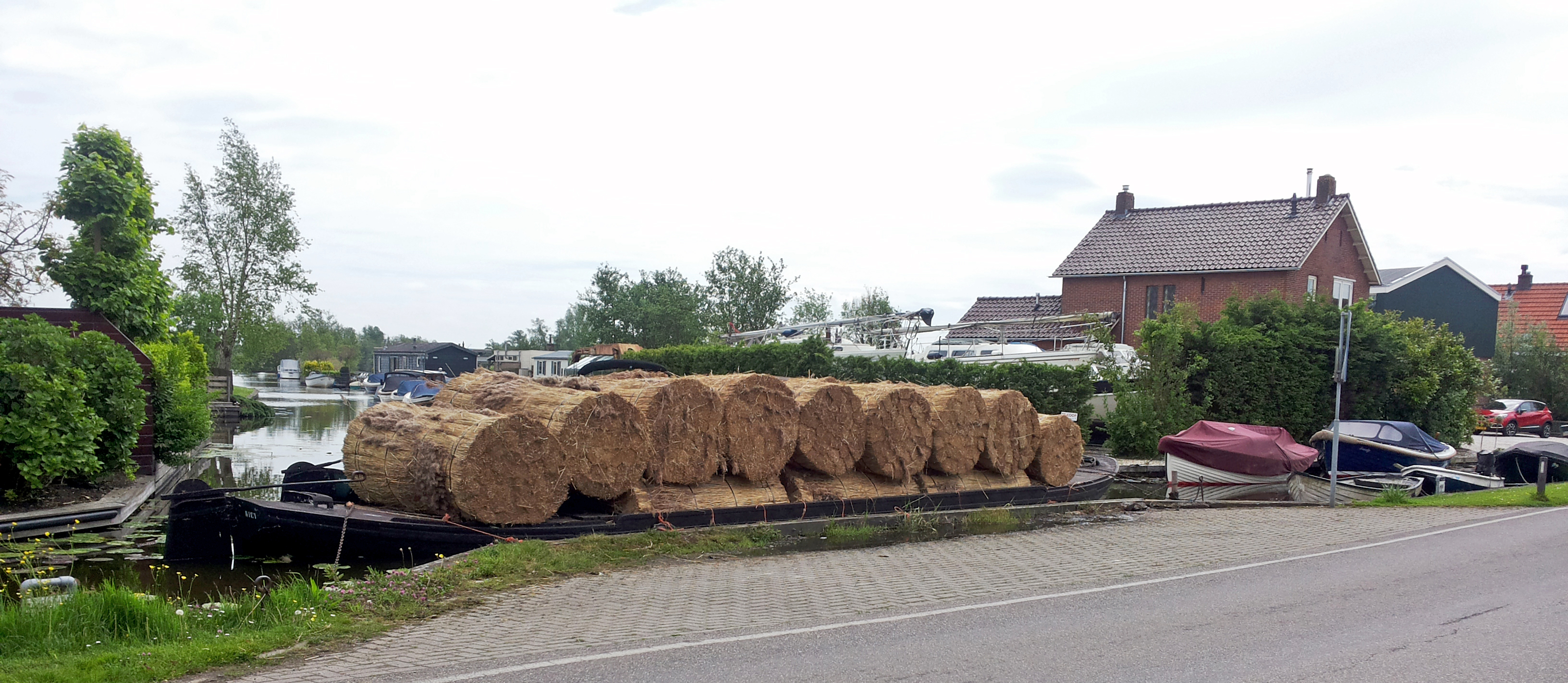
Veense pram with thatching reed bales in Nieuwkoop

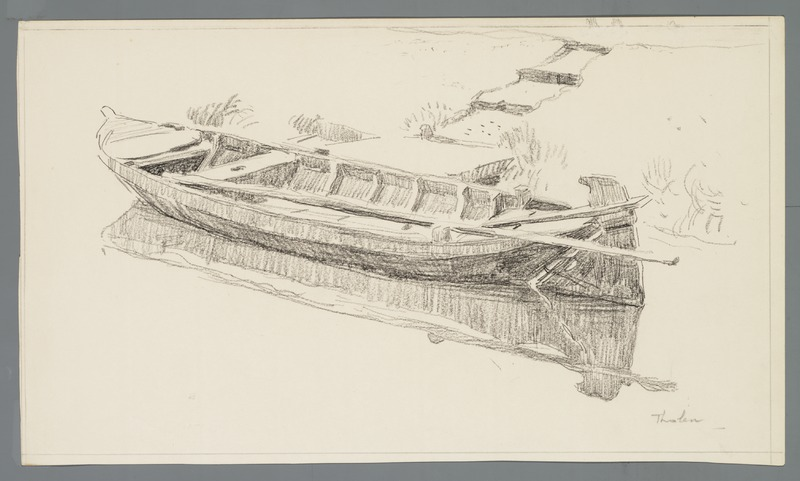
W.B. Tholen, pram, collection of the Zuiderzee Museum

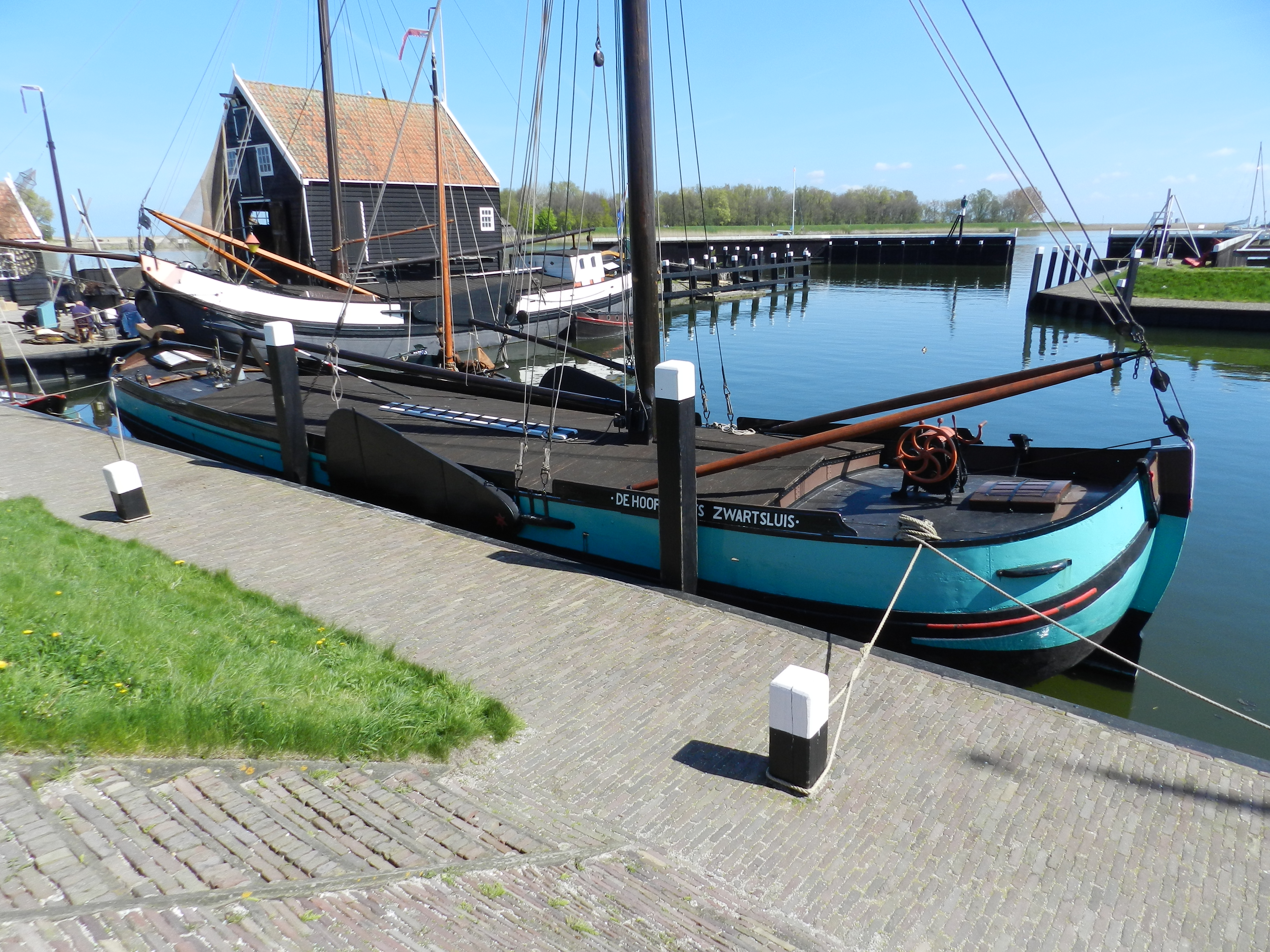
Boeier pram De Hoop in the Zuiderzee Museum

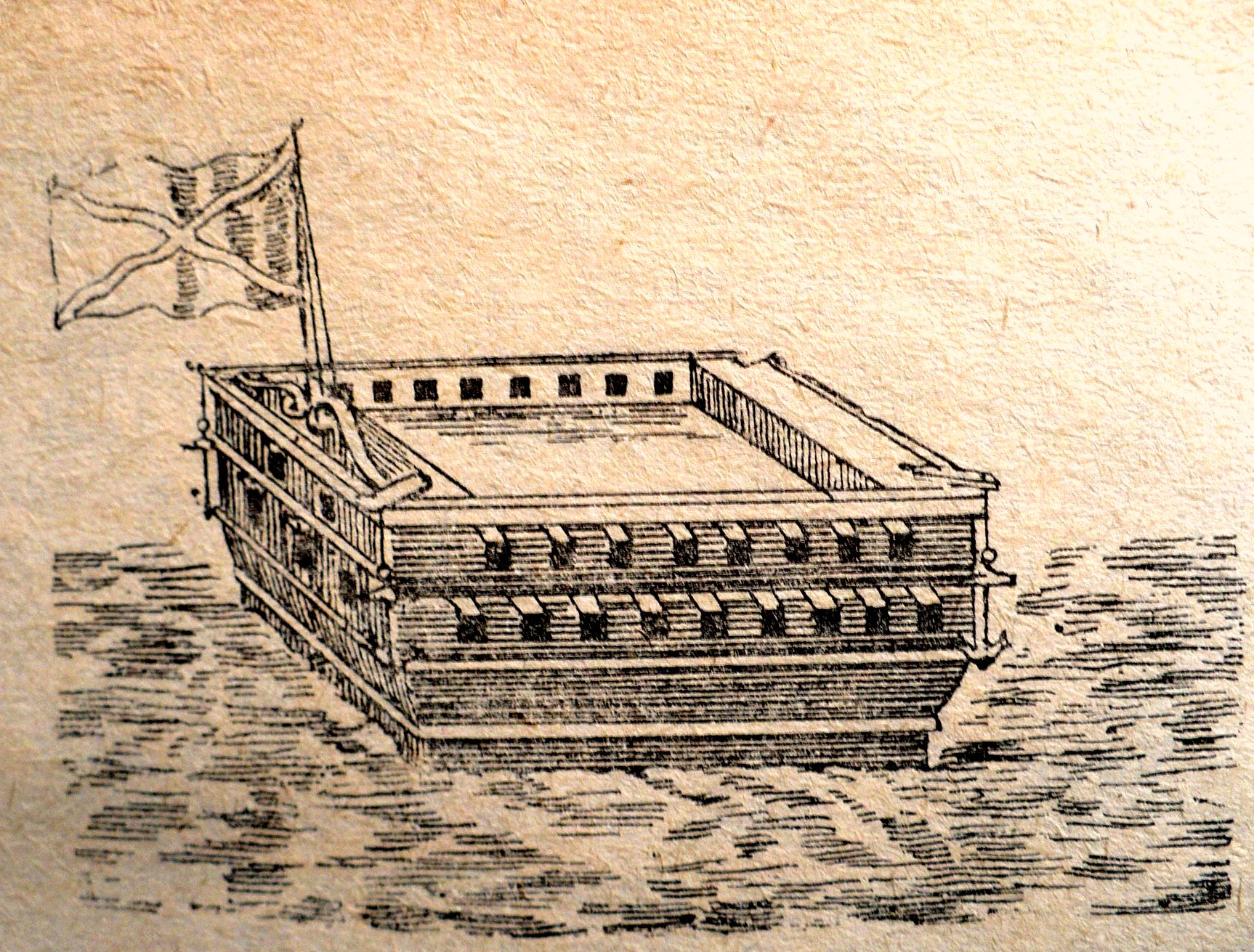
Russian 44-gun pram of Tavrovo Admiralty

== See also ==
- Hull
- Watercraft
- Narrowboat
- Barge
