= List of shipwrecks in 1796 =

The list of shipwrecks in 1796 includes ships sunk, foundered, wrecked, grounded or otherwise lost during 1796.

table of contents
1796
Jan	Feb	Mar	Apr
May	Jun	Jul	Aug
Sep	Oct	Nov	Dec
Unknown date

== January ==
=== 2 January ===
List of shipwrecks: 2 January 1796
Ship	State	Description
Unnamed	Flag unknown	The ship, with "cable and post attached", was driven out of Penzance harbour and on to nearby rocks in Mount's Bay, Cornwall.

=== 5 January ===
List of shipwrecks: 5 January 1796
Ship	State	Description
Polly	United States	The ship was lost at Madeira.

=== 11 January ===
List of shipwrecks: 11 January 1796
Ship	State	Description
Industry	United States	The vessel was wrecked at "Little Good Harbor". Lost with all hands.

=== 13 January ===
List of shipwrecks: 13 January 1796
Ship	State	Description
Diligent	Great Britain	The ship foundered in the Irish Sea off Bardsey Island, Pembrokeshire with the loss of all but one of her crew. She was on a voyage from Liverpool, Lancashire to Teignmouth, Devon. Her crew were rescued.

=== 22 January ===
List of shipwrecks: 22 January 1796
Ship	State	Description
Ann and Mary	Great Britain	The ship was lost in Algoa Bay. There were six survivors.

=== 23 January ===
List of shipwrecks: 23 January 1796
Ship	State	Description
Unnamed	Flag unknown	The troopship, probably one of Admiral Christian's West Indies convoy, was wrecked within a cable length (0.1 nautical miles (190 m)) of Loe Bar, Cornwall during a ″great storm″ in Mount's Bay. The ship was carrying between 400 and 600 officers and men of the 26th Regiment of Dragoons; not one of the crew or passengers survived. Large quantities of wreckage were washed up including dead horses with D26 brands on their hooves. It is estimated that over 600 people died including nine people on shore.
Unnamed	Flag unknown	A 300 ton ship from Bremen ran aground on Cairn Jenny, near the Abbey Slip, Penzance, Cornwall.
Unnamed	Great Britain	The ship was wrecked in Mounts Bay.

=== 24 January ===
List of shipwrecks: 24 January 1796
Ship	State	Description
Cartouche	France	The privateer foundered in the North Sea off the Dogger Bank with the loss of all hands.
Ponsonby Packet	Great Britain	The ship was wrecked on the North Bull, off Dublin, Ireland. She was on a voyage from Liverpool, Lancashire to Dublin.

=== 25 January ===
List of shipwrecks: 25 January 1796
Ship	State	Description
Unnamed	Flag unknown	The full-rigged ship foundered off Clogherhead, County Louth, Ireland with the loss of all hands.

=== 26 January ===
List of shipwrecks: 26 January 1796
Ship	State	Description
Dutton	British East India Company	The East Indiaman was wrecked at Plymouth, Devon with the loss of between eight and twenty lives.
Unnamed	Flag unknown	The brig foundered off the coast of County Louth, Ireland with the loss of all hands.

=== 28 January ===
List of shipwrecks: 28 January 1796
Ship	State	Description
Concordia	Great Britain	The ship foundered in the Bristol Channel off Ilfracombe, Devon. Her crew were rescued. She was on a voyage from London to Trinidada, Brazil.
HMS Hindostan	(Kingdom of Great Britain) Royal Navy	The fourth rate ship-of-the-line was driven into HMS Santa Margarita ( (Kingdom of Great Britain) Royal Navy) at Cork, Ireland and was damaged, the two vessels remaining entangled until the next day. HMS Hindostan was subsequently repaired at Kinsale, County Cork and returned to service. HMS Santa Margarita was repaired at Plymouth, Devon and returned to service.
Prins Carl von Hessen	Hamburg	The ship was driven ashore at Ramsgate, Kent, Great Britain. All on board, her crew and 180 hussars, were rescued.

=== 29 January ===
List of shipwrecks: 29 January 1796
Ship	State	Description
Astrée	French Navy	The Nymphe-class frigate was wrecked off Santo Amaro, Azores with the loss of 138 lives.
Lion	Great Britain	The ship ran aground at Plymouth, Devon and was damaged.

=== Unknown date ===
List of shipwrecks: Unknown date in January 1796
Ship	State	Description
Alert	Great Britain	The ship sprang a leak and put into Tobermory, Isle of Mull, where she was wrecked upon being beached. She was on a voyage from Liverpool, Lancashire to the West Indies.
Carouse	Great Britain	The schooner foundered in the Hamoaze, Plymouth, Devon. Her crew survived.
Chesapeak	United States	The ship was driven ashore near Christchurch, Hampshire, Great Britain. She was on a voyage from Le Havre, Seine-Inférieure, France to Baltimore, Maryland.
Christiana Helena	Sweden	The ship was lost on the coast of Norway. She was on a voyage from London, Great Britain to Gothenburg.
Commerce	Great Britain	The ship struck a sunken rock and was severely damaged. She was on a voyage from Trinidad to the Clyde. She put in to the Isle of Mull, Inner Hebrides.
Elizabeth	Great Britain	The ship was wrecked at Loch Crinan.
Fanny	Ireland	The ship was driven ashore on the coast on Norway. She was on a voyage from Christiansand, Norway to Ballyshannon, County Antrim.
Favourite	Great Britain	The ship was wrecked on the Isle of Mull. She was on a voyage from Liverpool to Martinique.
Friends	Great Britain	The ship was driven ashore and damaged in Loch Indaal. She was on a voyage from Liverpool to Tortola.
General Chacon	Great Britain	The ship was lost at Tenerife, Canary Islands.
George	Great Britain	The ship was driven ashore at Kinsale, County Cork, Ireland. She was on a voyage from Newcastle upon Tyne, Northumberland to Portsmouth, Hampshire and Cartagena, Spain.
Hope	Great Britain	The ship was wrecked at Malbay, County Clare, Ireland. Her crew were rescued. She was on a voyage from Charleston, South Carolina, United States to London.
John	Great Britain	The ship was driven ashore and wrecked near Christchurch, Hampshire. She was on a voyage from Le Havre to the Isle of May.
Lambe	Great Britain	The ship was wrecked at Palma de Mallorca while on a voyage from Naples, Kingdom of Sicily to an English port.
Lark	Great Britain	The ship departed from Lisbon, Portugal for London. No further trace, presumed foundered with the loss of all hands.
HMS Leda	(Kingdom of Great Britain) Royal Navy	The fifth-rate frigate struck a rock and foundered in the Atlantic Ocean off Madeira, Portugal with the loss of all but seven her crew. The survivors were rescued by HMS Bulldog ( (Kingdom of Great Britain) Royal Navy) and King George (Great Britain).
Little Devil	Flag unknown	The privateer was wrecked near Egersund, Norway.
London	Great Britain	The ship was run down and sunk off "Fairleigh" with the loss of all but four of her crew.
Margaretta	Batavian Republic	The full-rigged ship was driven ashore near Marazion, Cornwall, Great Britain. She was on a voyage from Rotterdam, South Holland to a French port.
Maria	Batavian Republic	The ship was lost near Morlaix, Finistère, France. She was on a voyage from Philadelphia, Pennsylvania, United States to Amsterdam, North Holland.
Nancy	United States	The ship was wrecked off Bermuda while on a voyage from Philadelphia to Jamaica. Her crew were rescued.
Neutrality	Great Britain	The ship foundered while on a voyage from Ostend, Lys, France to Liverpool.
October	Great Britain	The ship was driven ashore near New York, United States before 11 January.
Orford	Great Britain	The ship was driven ashore on Møn, Denmark. She was on a voyage from Wismar, Swedish Pomerania to Liverpool.
Prince	Great Britain	The West Indiaman was driven ashore on Selsey Bill, Sussex.
Priscilla	Great Britain	The ship was lost near Swansea, Glamorgan with the loss of all hands. She was on a voyage from Bristol to Alderney, Channel Islands.
Proserpina	Denmark	The ship was wrecked at Skagen. She was on a voyage from Elsinore to Amsterdam.
Providence	Great Britain	The ship foundered off Plymouth. She was on a voyage from Mothecombe, Devon to Plymouth.
Regende Jacob	Sweden	The ship was wrecked on the coast of Holland. She was on a voyage from Stockholm to Plymouth.
Sisters	Great Britain	The ship foundered in the English Channel off Dartmouth, Devon while on a voyage from St. Ubes, Portugal to London.
Smyrna	Great Britain	The ship was driven ashore on the Kent coast and was abandoned. She was on a voyage from Amsterdam to a Mediterranean port. Smyrna was later refloated and taken in to Dover, Kent.
Spirito Santo	Spain	The ship was wrecked at St. Augustin, Spanish Florida with the loss of four of her crew.
Thomas Wilson	Great Britain	The ship was driven ashore and severely damaged near Fort Monckton, Hampshire.
Three Sisters	Great Britain	The hospital ship was driven ashore on Selsey Bill.
Tres Amigos	Spain	The ship was driven ashore and severely damaged in the Bristol Channel. She was on a voyage from Cádiz to Londo. Tres Amigos was later refloated.
Washington	United States	The ship was destroyed by fire in the River Tawe. She was on a voyage from Swansea to Philadelphia.
Willing Mind	Great Britain	The ship was driven ashore and wrecked at Formby, Lancashire. She was on a voyage from São Miguel Island, Azores to Liverpool.

== February ==
=== 2 February ===
List of shipwrecks: 2 February 1796
Ship	State	Description
Stag	Ireland	The cutter was wrecked at Crosshaven, County Cork.

=== 6 February ===
List of shipwrecks: 6 February 1796
Ship	State	Description
Hall	Great Britain	The ship was wrecked at St Minver, Cornwall while on a voyage from Liverpool, Lancashire to Cork, Ireland and Jamaica.

=== 8 February ===
List of shipwrecks: 8 February 1796
Ship	State	Description
Prince of Wales	Great Britain	The ship was wrecked on the Peveral Ledge, near Swanage, Dorset. Her crew were rescued. She was on a voyage from Southampton, Hampshire to Jersey, Channel Islands.

=== 9 February ===
List of shipwrecks: 9 February 1796
Ship	State	Description
Clementina	Great Britain	The transport ship was driven ashore and wrecked on the coast of County Cork, Ireland. All on board were rescued.

=== 10 February ===
List of shipwrecks: 10 February 1796
Ship	State	Description
Anna	Great Britain	The ship foundered while on a voyage from Liepāja, Latvia to Rotterdam, South Holland, Batavian Republic.
Nancy	Great Britain	The ship foundered while on a voyage from Limerick, Ireland to Poole, Dorset. Her crew were rescued.
Four unnamed vessels	Flags unknown	The ships were driven ashore at Mogador, Morocco.

=== 15 February ===
List of shipwrecks: 15 February 1796
Ship	State	Description
Unity	Great Britain	The ship was run down and sunk off the Goodwin Sands, Kent by HMS Camilla ( (Kingdom of Great Britain) Royal Navy). She was on a voyage from South Shields, County Durham to Lisbon, Portugal.

=== 17 February ===
List of shipwrecks: 17 February 1796
Ship	State	Description
Shelston	Great Britain	The brig was wrecked on Skokholm, Pembrokeshire with the loss of a crew member while on a voyage from Liverpool, Lancashire to Bideford, Devon.

=== Unknown date ===
List of shipwrecks: Unknown date in February 1796
Ship	State	Description
Anna	Stettin	The ship was wrecked on the coast of Jutland. She was on a voyage from Stettin to London, Great Britain.
Anna	Batavian Republic	The ship was lost near Libava, Courland Governorate. She was on a voyage from Libava to Rotterdam, South Holland.
Aurora	Great Britain	The ship was driven ashore at Berck, Pas-de-Calais, France.
Aurora	Great Britain	The transport ship sprang a leak and was abandoned in the Atlantic Ocean 10 leagues (30 nautical miles (56 km) west of The Lizard, Cornwall. All on board about 150 people, were rescued by Sedgeley (Great Britain).
British Queen	Great Britain	The transport ship foundered in "Hozeley Bay" with some loss of life.
HMS Canada	(Kingdom of Great Britain) Royal Navy	The third rate ship-of-the-line was driven ashore at Cork, Ireland. She was refloated with the aid of HMS Penguin ( (Kingdom of Great Britain) Royal Navy).
Ceres	Great Britain	The ship was driven ashore at Faversham, Kent.
Chacer	Great Britain	The ship was lost in Honduras Bay. Her crew were rescued. She was on a voyage from British Honduras to London.
Charlotte	Great Britain	The ship was driven ashore near Appledore, Devon. She was on a voyage from Dublin, Ireland to London.
Concord	Great Britain	The ship was wrecked on the North Sand Head, in the North Sea. She was on a voyage from Hull, Yorkshire to Livorno, Grand Duchy of Tuscany.
Ellen	Ireland	The ship was driven ashore near Holyhead, Anglesey. She was on a voyage from Limerick to London.
Gibraltar	Great Britain	War of the First Coalition: The whaler was captured off Tinmouth, County Durham by a French privateer and was burnt. She was on a voyage from Hull to Greenland.
Jannett and Hellen	Great Britain	War of the First Coalition The ship was captured by a French privateer. She was run ashore at Lowestoft, Suffolk. Jannett and Hellen was on a voyage from Leith, Lothian to Hamburg.
John	Ireland	The ship was driven ashore on the Irish coast. She was on a voyage from Baltimore, Maryland, United States to Dublin.
La Ventura	Spain	The ship was wrecked at Ilfracombe, Devon, Great Britain while on a voyage from Bristol, Gloucestershire, Great Britain to Bilbao.
Maria	Great Britain	The ship was wrecked on the coast of Ireland. Her crew were rescued. She was on a voyage from Philadelphia, Pennsylvania, United States to Dublin.
Margaret	Flag unknown	The ship was wrecked near Cape Ann, Massachusetts, United States while on a voyage from Amsterdam, North Holland, Batavian Republic to Boston, Massachusetts.
Mountstuart	Great Britain	The ship foundered in the English Channel off Beachy Head, Sussex. She was on a voyage from Portsmouth, Hampshire to London.
Nancy	Great Britain	The ship was lost whilst on a voyage from Limerick to Poole, Dorset. Her crew were rescued.
Nancy	Great Britain	The ship was driven ashore and wrecked in Donegal Bay. She was on a voyage from Savannah, Georgia, United States to Lancaster, Lancashire.
Portland	Great Britain	The ship foundered in the English Channel off Boulogne, Pas-de-Calais, France. She was on a voyage from Cork to London.
Queen Charlotte	Great Britain	The ship was driven ashore and severely damaged at Shoeburyness, Essex. She was on a voyage from London to Liverpool, Lancashire. Queen Charlotte was later refloated.
Sarah	Great Britain	The ship departed from Liverpool for Newfoundland, British America. No further trace, presumed foundered in the Atlantic Ocean with the loss of all hands.
Shilstone	Great Britain	The ship was wrecked on Skokholm, Pembrokeshire with the loss of her captain. She was on a voyage from Liverpool to Biddiford, Devon.
Success	(Kingdom of Great Britain) Guernsey	The ship was driven ashore at Berck.
Summer	Great Britain	The ship was driven ashore at Margate, Kent. She was on a voyage from Hamburg to London.
Tracey	Ireland	The ship was lost near Wexford.
Union	Ireland	The ship was lost near Wexford.
Vine	(Kingdom of Great Britain) Jersey	The ship was wrecked in the Isles of Scilly. Her crew were rescued. Seven would-be rescuers were killed. She was on a voyage from Jersey to Virginia, United States.
Vrow Christiana	Hanover	The ship was lost whilst on a voyage from Jever to London.
Vrow Volina	Hanover	The ship was driven ashore at Great Yarmouth, Norfolk, Great Britain. She was on a voyage from Leer to London.
Unnamed	Great Britain	The galiot was driven ashore near Waterford, Ireland. She was on a voyage from St Martin's, Isles of Scilly to Placentia, Newfoundland, British America.
Two unnamed vessels	Great Britain	The colliers foundered in the North Sea 3 nautical miles (5.6 km) off Aldeburgh, Suffolk.

== March ==
=== 3 March ===
List of shipwrecks: 3 March 1796
Ship	State	Description
La Conception	Spain	The brig was abandoned in the Atlantic Ocean (40°N 17°W). Her ten crew were rescued by Virginia (Great Britain). La Conception was on a voyage from Cádiz to Belfast, County Down, Ireland.

=== 7 March ===
List of shipwrecks: 7 March 1796
Ship	State	Description
Mary	Great Britain	The ship foundered in the Bristol Channel off The Smalls, Her crew were rescued. She was on a voyage from Liverpool, Lancashire to Portsmouth, Hampshire.

=== 8 March ===
List of shipwrecks: 8 March 1796
Ship	State	Description
Gothenburg	(Sweden) Swedish East India Company	The East Indiaman was wrecked at the Cape of Good Hope. Her crew were rescued. She was on a voyage from Gothenburg to China.

=== 20 March ===
List of shipwrecks: 20 March 1796
Ship	State	Description
Mary & Clara	Great Britain	War of the First Coalition: The ship was captured and sunk in the North Sea by a French privateer. She was on a voyage from Whitby, Yorkshire to a Baltic port.

=== 25 March ===
List of shipwrecks: 25 March 1796
Ship	State	Description
Fortune	Great Britain	War of the First Coalition: The ship was captured by a French privateer in the English Channel off Dartmouth, Devon and was burnt.

=== 26 March ===
List of shipwrecks: 26 March 1796
Ship	State	Description
Ponsborne	British East India Company	The East Indiaman was lost off Grenada after having landed troops. Her crew were rescued.

=== Unknown date ===
List of shipwrecks: Unknown date in March 1796
Ship	State	Description
Bellisarius	Great Britain	The West Indies-bound troopship collided with HMS Royal Sovereign ( (Kingdom of Great Britain) Royal Navy) and foundered. About 110 survivors were rescued.
Betsey	France	The ship foundered in the North Sea. Her crew were rescued. She was on a voyage from Hamburg to Dunkirk, Nord.
Concord	Great Britain	War of the First Coalition: The ship was captured by a French frigate and was burnt. She was on a voyage from Lisbon, Portugal to London.
Eliza & Ann	Great Britain	The ship was lost in Cádiz Bay. She was on a voyage from Bristol, Gloucestershire to Venice.
Fortuna	Great Britain	The ship was driven ashore and wrecked near Málaga, Spain.
Fortune	Great Britain	War of the First Coalition: The ship was captured in the English Channel off Dartmouth, Devon by a French privateer. She was set afire and sunk.
Frau Karren	Hamburg	The ship was lost on the Kentish Knock. She was on a voyage from Hamburg to Cádiz, Spain.
Industry	Great Britain	The ship was wrecked on the coast of Lincolnshire. She was on a voyage from Berwick upon Tweed to London.
John and Henry	Great Britain	The ship was driven ashore at Milford Haven, Pembrokeshire and wrecked while on a voyage from Ipswich, Suffolk to Liverpool, Lancashire.
Juno, and Mars	Great Britain	Juno collided with Mars (Great Britain) off Whitby, Yorkshire and was beached. Mars was presumed to have foundered.
Loo	Great Britain	The ship was lost near Belfast, County Antrim, Ireland. She was on a voyage from Bristol to Belfast.
Lyde	Great Britain	The transport ship ran aground on The Shingles, Isle of Wight.
Margarett	Great Britain	War of the First Coalition: The ship was captured by Sémillante (French Navy) while on a voyage from Leith, Lothian to Lisbon. She was set afire and sank.
Maria Catharina	(Denmark) Norway	The ship was wrecked on the Goodwin Sands, Kent. Her crew were rescued. She was on a voyage from Dram to Cork, Ireland.
Mary	Great Britain	The ship was driven ashore at Poole, Dorset.
Mary	Batavian Republic	The ship was driven ashore and wrecked at St. Lucar, Spain.
Mary	United States	The ship was lost at the mouth of the Gironde River. She was on a voyage from Boston, Massachusetts to Bordeaux, Gironde, France.
Mentor	Great Britain	The ship was wrecked near Thurlestone, Devon before 15 March.
Minerva	Great Britain	The ship was wrecked on Île Pilée, off Cherbourg, Seine-Inférieure, France. She was on a voyage from London to Guernsey, Channel Islands.
Providence	Great Britain	The ship struck a rock and sank off Jersey, Channel Islands. Her crew were rescued. She was on a voyage from London to Jersey.
Refiner	Great Britain	The ship was lost near Cádiz. She was on a voyage from Cornwall to Naples, Kingdom of Sicily.
Regulator	Great Britain	The ship was driven ashore at Lisbon, Portugal. She was on a voyage from Barbados to London.
Tryphena	Great Britain	The ship was wrecked in Gibraltar Bay.
Vine	Great Britain	The ship was wrecked at Porto, Portugal. She was on a voyage from London to Porto.
Vrow Catharina	Flag unknown	The ship sank at Ramsgate, Kent, Great Britain.
William	(Kingdom of Great Britain) Jamaica	The snow foundered while on a voyage from Kingston to London.

== April ==
=== 4 April ===
List of shipwrecks: 11 April 1796
Ship	State	Description
HM Hired armed lugger Spider	Royal Navy	The hired armed lugger was run down and sunk by HMS Ramillies (Royal Navy).

=== 11 April ===
List of shipwrecks: 11 April 1796
Ship	State	Description
HMS Ça Ira	(Kingdom of Great Britain) Royal Navy	The hospital ship was destroyed by fire at Saint Florent, Corsica, France.

=== 20 April ===
List of shipwrecks: 20 April 1796
Ship	State	Description
Dronning Juliana Maria	Danish Asiatic Company	The full-rigged ship caught fire and sank in the Bay of Bengal.

=== 30 April ===
List of shipwrecks: 30 April 1796
Ship	State	Description
Elizabeth	Great Britain	The ship was sighted in the Øresund whilst on a voyage from Danzig to the Firth of Forth. No further trace, presumed foundered with the loss of all hands.

=== Unknown date ===
List of shipwrecks: Unknown date in April 1796
Ship	State	Description
Ann	Ireland	The ship was wrecked on the Kola Peninsula, Russia. She was on a voyage from Arkhangelsk, Russia to Dublin.
Bælana	Great Britain	The whaler was wrecked in the Shetland Islands. She was on a voyage from King's Lynn, Norfolk to Greenland.
Chaser	Great Britain	On 15 April 1796 she was at Iles de Los. She had been on shore some time before and sustained much damage; her cargo had been landed. She was later condemned there.
Cornbrook	Great Britain	The ship was driven ashore at Livorno, Grand Duchy of Tuscany. She was on a voyage from Livorno to Liverpool, Lancashire.
Diana	Great Britain	War of the First Coalition: The ship was captured by the French off Brest, Finistère, France. She was subsequently lost. Diana was on a voyage from Cardiff, Glamorgan to London.
Edinburgh	Great Britain	The ship struck a sunken rock and was severely damaged at Salcombe, Devon.
Elizabeth	Great Britain	The ship was wrecked on Norderney, Hanover. She was on a voyage from Great Yarmouth, Norfolk to Hamburg.
Mary	Great Britain	The ship was lost near Calais, France. Her crew were rescued. She was on a voyage from Newcastle upon Tyne, Northumberland to Falmouth, Cornwall.
Mary	Great Britain	War of the First Coalition: The ship was captured in the Atlantic Ocean (51°35′N 13°00′W) by a French privateer and was burnt.
Triton	Great Britain	The ship was driven ashore on Rathem Island. She was on a voyage from Greenock, Renfrewshire to Jamaica.
Victory	Great Britain	The ship was lost near Holyhead, Anglesey. She was on a voyage from Ipswich, Suffolk to Liverpool.
Unnamed	Great Britain	The ship was lost in the Elbe. Her crew were rescued. She was on a voyage from Sunderland, County Durgham to Hamburg.

== May ==
=== 22 May ===
List of shipwrecks: 22 May 1796
Ship	State	Description
Edgar	Great Britain	War of the First Coalition: The ship was captured off Cape Ortegal, Spain by a French frigate and was burnt. She was on a voyage from Liverpool, Lancashire to Africa.

=== 25 May ===
List of shipwrecks: 25 May 1796
Ship	State	Description
Ranger	Great Britain	War of the First Coalition: The ship was captured and sunk by Postiljon and Scipio (both Batavian Navy). She was on a voyage from London to Arkhangelsk, Russia.
196 unnamed vessels	Imperial Russian Navy	A fire at the Saint Petersburg ru:Galley Port destroyed 79 galleys, 10 gunboats, 7 floating batteries, a bomb vessel, 2 konchebas-es, 4 patrol boats, 11 landing craft, 81 boats and a Royal Yacht.

=== 26 May ===
List of shipwrecks: 26 May 1796
Ship	State	Description
Brothers	Great Britain	War of the First Coalition: The ship was captured and sunk in the North Sea 30 leagues (90 nautical miles (170 km) west of Domesnes, Norway by a French brig and frigate. She was on a voyage from Scotland to the Baltic.
Lord Hawkesbury	Great Britain	The whaler was lost near the Cape of Good Hope.

=== 28 May ===
List of shipwrecks: 28 May 1796
Ship	State	Description
Leeds	Great Britain	War of the First Coalition: The ship was captured and sunk by Républicaine (French Navy). She was on a voyage from Liverpool, Lancashire to a Baltic port.

=== 30 May ===
List of shipwrecks: 30 May 1796
Ship	State	Description
Mary	Great Britain	The ship was driven ashore at Southsea Castle, Hampshire.

=== 31 May ===
List of shipwrecks: 31 May 1796
Ship	State	Description
Maryann	Great Britain	War of the First Coalition: The ship was captured and sunk by Jason (Batavian Navy). Maryann was on a voyage from Nevis to Greenock, Renfrewshire. Following the action, the crew of Jason mutinied and took her in to Greenock, where she was seized by the Admiralty. Jason entered Royal Navy service as HMS Proselyte.

=== Unknown date ===
List of shipwrecks: Unknown date in May 1796
Ship	State	Description
Anthony	Ireland	War of the First Coalition: The ship was captured and scuttled by Tamise (French Navy). She was on a voyage from Waterford to Porto, Portugal.
Aurora	Denmark	The hoy was driven ashore near Newhaven, Sussex, Great Britain. She was on a voyage from St. Ubes, Portugal to Ostend, Lys, France.
De Anna Amelia	Lübeck	The ship was driven ashore and wrecked near Eastbourne, Sussex. She was on a voyage from Bordeaux, Gironde, France to Lübeck.
Dove	Great Britain	The ship was driven ashore on the coast of "Italy".
Elizabeth	Great Britain	The ship was wrecked at Skagen, Denmark with the loss of two of her crew. She was on a voyage from Liverpool, Lancashire to Pärnu, Russia.
Flora	Great Britain	The ship was lost off Portland, Dorset with the loss of thirteen of her crew.
Friends	Great Britain	The ship was wrecked on Bornholm, Denmark. She was on a voyage from Memel, Prussia to London.
Friend's Adventure	Great Britain	The ship was driven ashore at Great Yarmouth, Norfolk.
Greyhound	Great Britain	The ship was reported on 3 June to be onshore and bilged off Portsmouth.
Harmony	Great Britain	The ship was driven ashore and wrecked at Southend-on-Sea, Essex. She was on a voyage from Charleston, South Carolina, United States to London.
Hayle	Great Britain	The ship was driven ashore in St Ives Bay. She was on a voyage from Newcastle upon Tyne, Northumberland to Hayle, Cornwall.
Juniper	Great Britain	The ship was driven ashore at Corton, Suffolk. She was on a voyage from London to Selby, Yorkshire.
Little Tom Johnson	Great Britain	The ship was lost at Guernsey, Channel Islands.
Mary	Great Britain	The ship was driven ashore and wrecked at Portsmouth, Hampshire. She was on a voyage from London to Madeira.
Peggy	Great Britain	The ship was driven ashore and wrecked at Portland, Dorset with the loss of seven of her crew. She was on a voyage from Philadelphia, Pennsylvania, United States to London.
Princess Charlotte	Great Britain	The ship was driven ashore at Selsey Bill, Sussex. She was on a voyage from London to India.
Vrow Henrietta	Lübeck	The ship was driven ashore and wrecked near Rye, Sussex. She was on a voyage from Bordeaux to Lübeck.
William Pitt	Great Britain	The ship was lost on the Sandhammer Reef. She was on a voyage from Memel to London.
Unnamed	Sweden	The ship was wrecked at Bishopstone, Sussex.

== June ==
=== 10 June ===
List of shipwrecks: 10 June 1796
Ship	State	Description
HMS Arab	(Kingdom of Great Britain) Royal Navy	War of the First Coalition: The Révolutionnaire-class corvette struck a rock off the Glénan Islands, Finistère, France and foundered with the loss of 22 of her crew. There were about 80 survivors, who were taken prisoner by the French.

=== 16 June ===
List of shipwrecks: 16 June 1796
Ship	State	Description
Hercules	United States	The East Indiaman was wrecked on the coast of East Africa north of the Cape of Good Hope with the loss of thirteen of her crew. She was on a voyage from Bengal, India to London, Great Britain.

=== 30 June ===
List of shipwrecks: 30 June 1796
Ship	State	Description
São José	Portugal	The ship was captured by French corsairs 9 nautical miles (17 km) off the Azores. She was set afire and destroyed.

=== Unknown date ===
List of shipwrecks: Unknown date in June 1796
Ship	State	Description
Anna Maria	Great Britain	The ship foundered in the North Sea while on a voyage from Anstruther, Fife to Gothenburg, Sweden.
Felicity	Great Britain	War of the First Coalition: The ship was captured and sunk by Légère (French Navy). She was on a voyage from Youghall, County Cork, Ireland to Milford, Pembrokeshire.
Goodhope	Great Britain	War of the First Coalition: The ship was captured and sunk by Légère (French Navy). She was on a voyage from Youghall to Carmarthen.
Hope	(Kingdom of Great Britain) Guernsey	The sloop was captured and sunk by a French lugger privateer.
Industry	Great Britain	War of the First Coalition: The ship was captured and sunk by Atalante (French Navy). She was on a voyage from Lisbon, Portugal to Plymouth, Devon.
London Packet	Great Britain	The ship foundered at sea.
Maria	Ireland	War of the First Coalition: The ship was captured and scuttled by Légère (French Navy). She was on a voyage from Cork to Porto, Portugal.
Milnes	Great Britain	The ship was wrecked on the coast of Jutland while on a voyage from London to Saint Petersburg, Russia.
Nossa Senhora de Lupa	Great Britain	The ship was lost at Figueira da Foz. She was on a voyage from Figueira da Foz to Rio de Janeiro, Brazil.
Prince of Wales	Great Britain	War of the First Coalition: The ship was captured and reported to have been scuttled by Légère (French Navy). However, she was subsequently towed in to Waterford, Ireland.
Ranger	Great Britain	The ship was lost off Sicily. She was on a voyage from Naples, Kingdom of Sicily to an English port.
Washington	Hamburg	The ship was driven ashore near the Stag Rock, Penzance, Cornwall, Great Britain. She was on a voyage from Bengal, India to Hamburg.
Unnamed	Flag unknown	The ship ran aground in the Elbe. She was on a voyage from Puerto Rico to Hamburg.

== July ==
=== 1 July ===
List of shipwrecks: 1 July 1796
Ship	State	Description
Hibernia	Great Britain	War of the First Coalition: The ship was captured and burnt by two French frigates. She was on a voyage from Lancaster, Lancashire to the West Indies.

=== 6 July ===
List of shipwrecks: 6 July 1796
Ship	State	Description
Minerva	Great Britain	War of the First Coalition: The whaler was captured in the Atlantic Ocean (43°N 38°W) by Bayonnaise and four other vessels (all French Navy). She was burnt. Minerva was on a voyage from the South Seas to London.

=== 8 July ===
List of shipwrecks: 8 July 1796
Ship	State	Description
St. Ann	France	The ship foundered in the English Channel while on a voyage from Le Havre to Cherbourg, Seine-Inférieure. Her four crew were rescued by Nancy (Great Britain).

=== 12 July ===
List of shipwrecks: 12 July 1796
Ship	State	Description
HMS Active	Royal Navy	The fifth rate was lost in the Saint Lawrence River. All on board were rescued. She was on a voyage from Quebec City, Lower Canada, British America to London.

=== 13 July ===
List of shipwrecks: 13 July 1796
Ship	State	Description
Middlesex	British East India Company	The East Indiaman was lost in the River Thames near Erith, Kent.

=== 15 July ===
List of shipwrecks: 15 July 1796
Ship	State	Description
HMS Trompeuse	(Kingdom of Great Britain) Royal Navy	The brig-sloop was wrecked on the Farmer's Rock, off Kinsale, County Cork, Ireland. Her crew were rescued.

=== 17 July ===
List of shipwrecks: 17 July 1796
Ship	State	Description
Mariya (Мария, 'Mary')	Imperial Russian Navy	The galley-frigate was driven ashore and wrecked on sv:Vähä Eteläkari, near Haapasaari in the Gulf of Finland. Her crew were rescued.

=== 21 July ===
List of shipwrecks: 21 July 1796
Ship	State	Description
Orange Valley	Great Britain	War of the First Coalition: The ship was captured in the Atlantic Ocean by a French squadron and was burnt. She was on a voyage from Jamaica to Bristol, Gloucestershire.

=== Unknown date ===
List of shipwrecks: Unknown date in July 1796
Ship	State	Description
Albion	Great Britain	The ship was driven ashore near Newhaven, Sussex. She was on a voyage from Saint Petersburg, Russia to Newhaven.
Britannia	Great Britain	War of the First Coalition: The ship was captured in the Atlantic Ocean (48°N 15°W) by Ranger (French Navy)) and was burnt. She was on a voyage from Liverpool, Lancashire to Newfoundland, British America.
Commerce	Great Britain	The ship caught fire and was scuttled at Liverpool. She was on a voyage from Liverpool to New York, United States.
Fair American	United States	The ship was driven ashore and wrecked at Bembridge, Isle of Wight, Great Britain. She was on a voyage from London to Ramsgate, Kent and New York.
Fortress	Great Britain	War of the First Coalition: The ship was captured and scuttled by the French. She was on a voyage from St. Ubes, Portugal to Newfoundland, British America.
Frederick and George	Great Britain	War of the First Coalition: The ship was driven ashore and wrecked at Beachy Head, Sussex whilst evading a French privateer. She was on a voyage from Weymouth, Dorset to King's Lynn, Norfolk.
Hester	Great Britain	The ship was wrecked on the Heneaga Reef. Her crew were rescued. She was on a voyage from Saint-Domingue to London.
Primrose	Great Britain	The ship foundered in Liverpool Bay. Her crew were rescued. She was on a voyage from Limerick, Ireland to Liverpool.
St Joseph	Hamburg	The ship was wrecked on the Goodwin Sands, Kent, Great Britain. Her crew were rescued. She was on a voyage from Lisbon and/or Porto, Portugal to Hamburg.
Whitworth	Great Britain	The ship was lost on the Cross Sand, in the North Sea off Great Yarmouth, Norfolk. She was on a voyage from Sunderland, County Durham to London.

== August ==
=== 1 August ===
List of shipwrecks: 1 August 1796
Ship	State	Description
Arkhipelag	Imperial Russian Navy	The Bratislav-class frigate ran agroud on the Nore. She was refloated with assistance from HMS Spitfire (1782) and a hired armed tender (both Royal Navy).

=== 14 August ===
List of shipwrecks: 14 August 1796
Ship	State	Description
Middlesex	British East India Company	The East Indiaman ran aground and was wrecked in the River Thames at Woolwich, Kent.

=== 15 August ===
List of shipwrecks: 15 August 1796
Ship	State	Description
Elizabeth	United States	The ship departed from Norfolk, Virginia for Saint Barthélemy. No further trace, presumed foundered with the loss of all hands.

=== 22 August ===
List of shipwrecks: 22 August 1796
Ship	State	Description
Andromaque	French Navy	War of the First Coalition: The Nymphe-class frigate was driven ashore in Arcachon Bay by HMS Galatea and HMS Sylph (both (Kingdom of Great Britain) Royal Navy). She was burnt by the British.
Anna Margaretha	Denmark	The brig ran aground off Start Point, Devon, Great Britain. She was on a voyage from Newcastle upon Tyne, Northumberland, Great Britain to Barcelona, Spain. She was refloated on 24 August and put in to Plymouth, Devon.

=== 27 August ===
List of shipwrecks: 27 August 1796
Ship	State	Description
HMS Undaunted	(Kingdom of Great Britain) Royal Navy	The frigate was wrecked on the Morant Cays, in the West Indies.

=== 28 August ===
List of shipwrecks: 28 August 1796
Ship	State	Description
Speedwell	Great Britain	The ship was wrecked on the Carysfort Reef. Her crew were rescued She was on a voyage from British Honduras to Charleston, South Carolina, British America.

=== Unknown date ===
List of shipwrecks: Unknown date in August 1796
Ship	State	Description
Astrea	Great Britain	The ship driven ashore and wrecked in Tetuan Bay, near Tétouan, Morocco. Her crew were rescued.
Elizabeth	Great Britain	The ship was wrecked in the Baltic. She was on a voyage from Pernau, Livonia, Russian Empire to Liverpool, Lancashire.
Lady Taylor	Great Britain	The ship was wrecked on the Goodwin Sands, Kent. She was on a voyage from Jamaica to London
Mary	Great Britain	The ship foundered in the Atlantic Ocean. Her crew were rescued by Friendship (Great Britain) on 25 September. Mary was on a voyage from British Honduras to London.
Middlesex	Great Britain	The ship was driven ashore and wrecked in the River Thames at Erith, Kent. She was on a voyage from Barbados to London.
Ranger	Ireland	The ship was driven ashore in the Gulf of Finland. Her crew were rescued. She was on a voyage from Saint Petersburg, Russia to Dublin.
Ranger	Great Britain	The transport ship was lost in the Gulf of Florida.
HMS Serin	Royal Navy	The Hasard-class brig-aviso foundered with the loss of all hands.
Sultana	Great Britain	The ship was wrecked on the Red Sand, in the North Sea off Whitstable, Kent. She was on a voyage from Falmouth, Cornwall to London.

== September ==
=== 19 September ===
List of shipwrecks: 19 September 1796
Ship	State	Description
Little Harry	Great Britain	The ship foundered in the Atlantic Ocean. Her crew were rescued. She was on a voyage from Porto, Portugal to Newfoundland, British America.

=== 22 September ===
List of shipwrecks: 22 September 1796
Ship	State	Description
HMS Amphion	(Kingdom of Great Britain) Royal Navy	The fifth-rate ship-of-the-line exploded and sank at Plymouth, Devon with the loss of 300 of the 312 people on board.

=== Unknown date ===
List of shipwrecks: Unknown date in September 1796
Ship	State	Description
Amphitrite	Ireland	The ship was driven ashore and severely damaged near Dublin. She was on a voyage from Saint Petersburg, Russia to Dublin.
Betsey & Brothers	Great Britain	The ship departed from Liverpool, Lancashire for Africa. No further trace, presumed foundered with the loss of all hands.
Brideport	Great Britain	The ship was wrecked on the Lemon and Ore Sand, in the North Sea. She was on a voyage from Saint Petersburg to London.
Brothers	Great Britain	The ship foundered in the Dogger Bank. Her crew were rescued.
Dorothea	Great Britain	The ship was driven ashore and was abandoned by her crew. She was later refloated and taken in to Whitby, Yorkshire.
Earl of Derby	Great Britain	The ship was driven ashore and severely damaged on the coast of Aberdeenshire. She was on a voyage from Saint Petersburg to Liverpool.
Fair Hibernian	Great Britain	The ship was driven ashore and severely damaged on the Isle of Lewis, Outer Hebrides. She was on a voyage from Saint Petersburg to Dublin.
London	Great Britain	The ship was lost near Pärnu, Russia. She was on a voyage from Pärnu to Liverpool.
Princess Royal	Great Britain	The ship was driven ashore near Liverpool. She was on a voyage from the Baltic to Liverpool.
Sykes	Great Britain	The ship was wrecked on Bornholm, Denmark. She was on a voyage from Hull, Yorkshire to Danzig.
Thetis	Great Britain	The ship was lost in the Gulf of Finland. She was on a voyage from Saint Petersburg to London.
Three Brothers	Great Britain	The ship was driven ashore and wrecked in the Sound of Mull. She was on a voyage from Saint Petersburg to Liverpool.
Vrow Anna	Prussia	The ship ran aground on the Cross Sand, in the North Sea and was abandoned. She was on a voyage from Königsburg to Bristol, Gloucestershire, Great Britain. She was later refloated and taken in to Great Yarmouth, Norfolk, Great Britain.
Windsor Castle	Great Britain	The ship was driven ashore near Liverpool. She was on a voyage from Saint Petersburg to Liverpool.
Yarmouth	Great Britain	The ship was lost in the Pentland Firth. She was on a voyage from Liverpool, Lancashire to a Baltic port.

== October ==
=== 3 October ===
List of shipwrecks: 3 October 1796
Ship	State	Description
Glory	Great Britain	The ship was driven ashore at New Providence, New Jersey, United States.
HMS Narcissus	(Kingdom of Great Britain) Royal Navy	The Sphinx-class post ship wrecked.

=== 5 October ===
List of shipwrecks: 5 October 1796
Ship	State	Description
Withywood	Great Britain	The ship was destroyed by fire in the Atlantic Ocean. She was on a voyage from Jamaica to London.

=== 9 October ===
List of shipwrecks: 9 October 1796
Ship	State	Description
London	Great Britain	The transport ship was lost near Ilfracombe, Devon.

=== 11 October ===
List of shipwrecks: 11 October 1796
Ship	State	Description
HMS Malabar	(Kingdom of Great Britain) Royal Navy	The fourth rate ship-of-the-line foundered. Her crew were rescued by Martha (Great Britain).

=== 16 October ===
List of shipwrecks: 16 October 1796
Ship	State	Description
Betsey & Mary	Great Britain	The ship departed from Liverpool, Lancashire for Riga, Russia. No further trace, presumed foundered with the loss of all hands.

=== 21 October ===
List of shipwrecks: 21 October 1796
Ship	State	Description
HMS Vanneau	Royal Navy	The Serf-Voland-class lugger struck a sunken rock and was wrecked at Porto-Ferrajo, Elba, Grand Duchy of Tuscany.

=== 25 October ===
List of shipwrecks: 25 October 1796
Ship	State	Description
Arkhangel Mikhail (Архангел Михаил, 'Archangel Michael')	Imperial Russian Navy	The frigate ran aground at a skerry 2 nautical miles (3.7 km) west of sv:Träskön Island, near Porkkalanniemi in the Gulf of Finland. She was refloated but then struck a rock and sank. Her crew were rescued.
Hazard	French Navy	The Hasard-class brig was wrecked on the Moines reef off Île Saint-Honorat, Alpes-Maritimes. The loss is also reported as on 28 October

=== 26 October ===
List of shipwrecks: 26 October 1796
Ship	State	Description
HMS Berbice	Royal Navy	The schooner was wrecked on Scotsman's Head, Dominica. Her 42 crew survived.
Margaret	Great Britain	The ship was wrecked at St. Mary's, Isles of Scilly while on a voyage from Liverpool, Lancashire to Charleston, South Carolina, United States.

=== 30 October ===
List of shipwrecks: 30 October 1796
Ship	State	Description
Jenny	Great Britain	War of the First Coalition: The ship was captured and sunk in the Atlantic Ocean (50°N 21°W) by a French privateer cutter.

=== 31 October ===
List of shipwrecks: 31 October 1796
Ship	State	Description
HMS Curlew	Royal Navy	The Diligence-class brig-sloop foundered in the North Sea with the loss of all hands.

=== Unknown date ===
List of shipwrecks: Unknown date in October 1796
Ship	State	Description
August	Great Britain	The ship was lost near Wexford, Ireland. She was on a voyage from Poole, Dorset to Liverpool, Lancashire.
Beaver	United States	The ship departed from Charleston, South Carolina for Rotterdam, South Holland, Batavian Republic. Presumed subsequently foundered with the loss of all hands.
Betsey	Great Britain	The ship was run down and sunk in the English Channel off Dungeness, Kent by a West Indiaman. Her crew were rescued.
Carolina	Russia	The ship was lost near Liepāja. She was on a voyage from Saint Petersburg to London, Great Britain.
Carrier	Great Britain	The ship was wrecked in the Orkney Islands while on a voyage from a Baltic port to Whitehaven, Lancashire.
Crown	Great Britain	The ship was run down and sunk by Jonas (Great Britain) off North Foreland, Kent.
Friendship	Russia	The ship was driven ashore at Arkhangelsk.
Henrietta	Denmark	The ship was driven ashore near Chichester, Sussex, Great Britain. She was on a voyage from Saint Croix to Copenhagen.
John and Mary	Ireland	The ship was wrecked on the Goodwin Sands, Kent. Her crew were rescued. She was on a voyage from Newry, County Down to Newcastle upon Tyne, Northumberland, Great Britain.
Neptune	(Kingdom of Great Britain) Guernsey	The ship was wrecked at the Currituck Inlet, North Carolina, United States before 13 October. She was on a voyage from Guernsey to Norfolk, Virginia, United States.
Orphyr	United States	The ship was driven ashore and wrecked on the coast of Holland. She was on a voyage from Philadelphia, Pennsylvania to Amsterdam, Batavian Republic.
Royal Oak	Great Britain	The ship was driven ashore near Ice Fiord. She was on a voyage from Great Yarmouth, Norfolk to Saint Petersburg.
Scarthingwell	Great Britain	The ship ran aground on the Seska Reef, in the Baltic Sea. She was on a voyage from Saint Petersburg to Hull, Yorkshire.
Shelton Castle	Great Britain	The ship was lost near Great Yarmouth.

== November ==
=== 3 November ===
List of shipwrecks: 3 November 1796
Ship	State	Description
HMS Helena	Royal Navy	The sloop-of-war was driven ashore and wrecked on the Dutch coast with the loss of all hands.

=== 11 November ===
List of shipwrecks: 11 November 1796
Ship	State	Description
Perfily (Перфилий)	Imperial Russian Navy	The galiot was beached on Severny Beryozovy of Beryozovye Islands in the Gulf of Finland. She was on a voyage from Vyborg to Kronstadt.

=== 25 November ===
List of shipwrecks: 25 November 1796
Ship	State	Description
Décius	French Navy	War of the First Coalition: The sixth rate frigate was captured by HMS Lapwing ( (Kingdom of Great Britain) Royal Navy. She was burnt the next day to prevent recapture.

=== 29 November ===
List of shipwrecks: 29 November 1796
Ship	State	Description
Peter	Great Britain	The ship departed from Newfoundland for an English port. No further trace, presumed foundered in the Atlantic Ocean with the loss of all hands.

=== Unknown date ===
List of shipwrecks: Unknown date in November 1796
Ship	State	Description
Active	Great Britain	The ship was lost in the Humber.
Admirable Eliza	Great Britain	The ship was lost whilst on a voyage from Hamburg to Amsterdam, Batavian Republic. There were two survivors.
Adventure	Great Britain	The ship was driven ashore in the Orkney Islands. She was on a voyage from Saint Petersburg, Russia to Liverpool, Lancashire.
Ann	Great Britain	War of the First Coalition: The ship was captured and destroyed by the privateer Buonaparte (France). She was on a voyage from Poole, Dorset to Naples, Kingdom of Sicily.
Caledonia	Great Britain	The ship was driven ashore near Riga, Russia. She was on a voyage from Riga to London.
Cleopatra	United States	The ship departed from Baltimore, Maryland for Martinique. No further trace, presumed foundered in the Atlantic Ocean with the loss of all handns.
Crescent	Great Britain	The ship was driven ashore crewless at Sandown Fort, Isle of Wight. She was on a voyage from Dublin, Ireland to London. Crescent was later refloated and taken in to Cowes, Isle of Wight.
Duke of Cumberland	Great Britain	The ship collided with another vessel in the North Sea and was presumed to have foundered. She was on a voyage from Newcastle upon Tyne, Northumberland to Gothenburg, Sweden.
Euphrasia	Ireland	The ship was driven ashore near Wexford. She was on a voyage from Dublin to Baltimore, Maryland.
Friends	Great Britain	The ship was wrecked on the Gunfleet Sand, in the North Sea off the coast of Essex, with the loss of five of her crew. She was on a voyage from Stettin to London.
Gulle Hoffnung	Flag unknown	The ship was lost in the Baltic Sea. She was on a voyage from London to a Baltic port.
Hillsborough	Ireland	The ship was lost whilst on a voyage from Belfast, County Antrim to Dublin.
Integrity	Great Britain	The ship foundered in the Baltic Sea. Her crew were rescued. She was on a voyage from Memel, Prussia to Hull, Yorkshire.
Irinarkh (Иринарх, 'Irenarchus')	Imperial Russian Navy	The ship was damaged by ice and sank in the Dnieper estuary.
Jane	Great Britain	The ship was lost at Dumsness, Riga. She was on a voyage from Riga to London.
Kipriyan (Киприян, 'Cyprian')	Imperial Russian Navy	The ship was holed by ice and sank in the Dnieper estuary.
Kitty	Great Britain	The ship was driven ashore and severely damaged at Plymouth, Devon. She was on a voyage from Milford Haven, Pembrokeshire to Poole, Dorset.
Lands Welvaret	Hanover	The ship was lost near Emden. She was on a voyage from London to Emden.
Mariya (Мария, 'Mary')	Imperial Russian Navy	The ship was holed by ice and sank in the Dnieper estuary.
Mary	Great Britain	The ship was lost near Danzig. She was on a voyage from Memel to London.
Mary	Great Britain	The ship was driven ashore at Great Yarmouth, Norfolk.
Neptune	Ireland	War of the First Coalition: The ship was captured and destroyed by the privateer Buonaparte (France). She was on a voyage from Dublin to São Miguel Island, Azores.
Neptune	Great Britain	The ship was driven ashore on Norderney, Hanover. Her crew were rescued. She was on a voyage from London to Emden.
Ophis	United States	The ship was lost on the coast of Holland.
Pernassus	Great Britain	The transport ship was lost at Corsica, France.
Providence	Great Britain	The ship was driven ashore at Lowestoft, Suffolk.
Regina Elizabeth	Stettin	The ship was lost on the coast of Jutland. She was on a voyage from London to Stettin.
Seaflower	Great Britain	The ship was driven ashore near Riga. She was on a voyage from Riga to London.
St. John	Ireland	The ship was driven ashore in the River Suir. She was on a voyage from Narva, Russia to Waterford.
Thomas & Jane	Great Britain	The ship was lost in the Humber with the loss of all hands.
Union	Great Britain	The ship foundered in the Irish Sea. Her crew were rescued. She was on a voyage from Truro, Cornwall to Neath, Glamorgan.
Union	Great Britain	The ship was in collision with another vesseld and was abandoned by her crew. She subsequently came ashore on the coast of Lincolnshire. Union was on a voyage from London to Inverness.

== December ==
=== 5 December ===
List of shipwrecks: 5 December 1796
Ship	State	Description
Atlas	Great Britain	The ship collided with Patriot (Great Britain) in the English Channel off Beachy Head, Sussex and foundered. Her crew were rescued by Guernsey Lily ( (Kingdom of Great Britain) Guernsey). Atlas was on a voyage from London to Lisbon, Portugal.

=== 13 December ===
List of shipwrecks: 13 December 1796
Ship	State	Description
Amor Parentum	Hamburg	The ship departed from Gravesend, Kent, Great Britain for Hamburg. No further trace, presumed foundered in the North Sea with the loss of all hands.

=== 16 December ===
List of shipwrecks: 16 December 1796
Ship	State	Description
Séduisant	French Navy	War of the First Coalition, Expédition d'Irlande: The Séduisant-class ship of the line was wrecked off Brest, Finistère with the loss of 1,150 of the 1,210 people on board.

=== 18 December ===
List of shipwrecks: 18 December 1796
Ship	State	Description
HMS Courageux	(Kingdom of Great Britain) Royal Navy	The third rate ship-of-the-line was wrecked off Gibraltar with the loss of all but five of her crew.

=== 19 December ===
List of shipwrecks: 19 December 1796
Ship	State	Description
William & Robert	Great Britain	The brig departed from Gravesend, Kent for Bristol, Gloucestershire. No further trace, presumed foundered with the loss of all hands.

=== 24 December ===
List of shipwrecks: 24 December 1796
Ship	State	Description
HMS Cormorant	(Kingdom of Great Britain) Royal Navy	The Cormorant-class ship-sloop caught fire, exploded and sank at Port-au-Prince, Hispaniola with the loss of 95 lives.
Fortuna	Great Britain	The ship was lost on the coast of Portugal. She was on a voyage from Barcelona, Spain to London.

=== 25 December ===
List of shipwrecks: 25 December 1796
Ship	State	Description
Amity	Great Britain	The ship sprang a leak in the Atlantic Ocean (35°49′N 50°14′W) and was abandoned. Her crew were rescued by Guardian (Great Britain). Amity was on a voyage from Martinique to London.

=== 27 December ===
List of shipwrecks: 27 December 1796
Ship	State	Description
Centurion	Great Britain	The ship was driven ashore at Great Yarmouth, Norfolk. Her crew were rescued.
Edinburgh	Great Britain	The ship was driven ashore at Great Yarmouth. Her crew were rescued.
Elizabeth	Great Britain	The ship was driven ashore at Great Yarmouth. Her crew were rescued. She was on a voyage from London to Gainsborough, Lincolnshire.
Fanny	Great Britain	The ship was driven ashore at Great Yarmouth. Her crew were rescued. She was on a voyage from London to a Scottish port.
Freedom	Great Britain	The ship was driven ashore at Great Yarmouth. Her crew were rescued.
Friendship	Great Britain	The ship was driven ashore at Great Yarmouth. Her crew were rescued. She was on a voyage from London to Sunderland, County Durham.
Hope	Great Britain	The ship was driven ashore at Great Yarmouth.
Robert and Mary	Great Britain	The ship was driven ashore at Great Yarmouth. Her crew were rescued. She was on a voyage from London to Hull, Yorkshire.
Mary	Great Britain	The ship was driven ashore at Great Yarmouth. She was on a voyage from London to Hull.
Sarah	Great Britain	The ship was driven ashore at Great Yarmouth.
Union	Great Britain	The ship was driven ashore at Great Yarmouth.

=== 29 December ===
List of shipwrecks: 29 December 1796
Ship	State	Description
Amazon	Great Britain	War of the First Coalition: The ship was captured by a French squadron and sunk.
Impatiente	French Navy	War of the First Coalition, Expédition d'Irlande: The Romaine-class frigate ship-of-the-line was wrecked in Bantry Bay with the loss of 420 of her 427 crew.

=== 30 December ===
List of shipwrecks: 30 December 1796
Ship	State	Description
Queen	Great Britain	The transport ship foundered in the Atlantic Ocean. Her crew were rescued.
Scévola	French Navy	War of the First Coalition, Expédition d'Irlande: The Magnanime-class ship-of-the-line was wrecked in Bantry Bay. Her crew were rescued by Révolution (French Navy).

=== 31 December ===
List of shipwrecks: 30 December 1796
Ship	State	Description
Juste	French Navy	War of the First Coalition The transport ship, a former East Indiaman, was captured by HMS Polyphemus (Royal Navy). She subsequently foundered 150 leagues (390 nmi; 720 km) north west of Cape Clear Island, County Clare, Ireland. She had 900 troops on board.

=== Unknown date ===
List of shipwrecks: Unknown date in December 1796
Ship	State	Description
Ann	Great Britain	The ship was wrecked at Gibraltar.
Berrington	Great Britain	The East Indiaman ran aground at Fort St. George, Madras, India. She was refloated.
Betsey	Great Britain	The ship was lost on the Kentish Knock. Her crew were rescued. She was on a voyage from Newcastle upon Tyne, Northumberland to Portsmouth, Hampshire.
HMS Bombay Castle	(Kingdom of Great Britain) Royal Navy	The Elizabeth-class ship of the line foundered at the mouth of the Tagus.
Brilliant	Great Britain	The ship was lost on the coast of Norway.
Brilliant	Great Britain	The ship was lost on the north coast of Ireland. She was on a voyage from Porto to Greenock, Renfrewshire.
Crown Princess Mary	(Denmark) Danish Asiatic Company	The East Indiaman was driven ashore and wrecked near Calais, France. She was on a voyage from Copenhagen to the East Indies.
Daphne	Hamburg	The ship was driven ashore in Bigbury Bay. She was on a voyage from Porto to Hamburg.
Diana	United States	War of the First Coalition: The ship was sent into Martinique by an "English cruizer". She was burnt there. Diana was on a voyage from India to the United States.
Esther	Great Britain	The ship foundered in the Baltic Sea. She was on a voyage from Riga, Russia to Plymouth, Devon.
Frederica Henrietta	Bremen	The ship was lost in the Weser. She was on a voyage from Baltimore, Maryland, United States to Bremen.
Friends	Great Britain	The ship was driven ashore in the "Highlands". She was on a voyage from the Baltic to Liverpool, Lancashire.
Friends	Great Britain	The ship was wrecked on the Welsh coast with the loss of most of her crew.
Generous Friends	Great Britain	The ship foundered in the Atlantic Ocean. Her crew were rescued. She was on a voyage from Newfoundland, British America to Exeter, Devon.
Good Design	Great Britain	The ship was driven ashore near Whitby, Yorkshire.
Governor Bruce	Great Britain	The ship was driven ashore near Bridgwater, Somerset. She was on a voyage from Venice to Bristol, Gloucestershire.
Hope	Great Britain	The ship was driven ashore at Killough, County Down, Ireland while on a voyage from Porto, Portugal to Liverpool.
Jenny	Great Britain	The ship ran aground on the Goodwin Sands, Kent and was severely damaged. She was on a voyage from London to Southampton, Hampshire. She was refloated and taken in to Ramsgate, Kent.
Liberty	Great Britain	The ship departed from London for Leith, Lothian. No further trace, presumed foundered in the North Sea with the loss of all hands.
Laurentius	Prussia	The ship was lost whilst on a voyage from Memel to Bordeaux, Gironde, France.
Lerche	Hamburg	The ship was driven ashore and severely damaged near Dover, Kent, Great Britain. She was on a voyage from Lancaster, Lancashire to Hamburg. Lerche was refloated and taken in to Dover.
Mariner	Great Britain	The ship was lost on the Isle of Lewis. Her crew were rescued. She was on a voyage from a Baltic port to Liverpool.
Mary	Great Britain	The ship was lost near Memel, Prussia. She was on a voyage from Memel to London.
Nancy	Great Britain	The ship was lost at St. Ives, Cornwall. She was on a voyage from Penzance, Cornwall to the Strait of Gibraltar.
Peace and Plenty	Ireland	The ship was lost near Reval, Russia. She was on a voyage from Saint Petersburg, Russia to Dublin.
Port Rosaway	Great Britain	The ship was driven ashore and severely damaged in the River Thames at Cuckold's Point, Surrey. She was on a voyage from London to Dublin.
Prospect	Great Britain	The ship was lost near Memel.
Recovery	Great Britain	The ship foundered in the Mediterranean Sea while on a voyage from Gallipoli, Ottoman Empire to Bristol. Her crew were rescued.
Resolution	Great Britain	The ship was driven ashore on the coast of Norfolk. She was on a voyage from Wyburg, Russia to Liverpool, Lancashire.
Rose in June	Great Britain	The ship struck a rock off Land's End, Cornwall. She was on a voyage from Dublin to London. She put in to Marazion, Cornwall.
Speedy Packet	Great Britain	The ship foundered in the English Channel with the loss of two of her crew. She was on a voyage from Jersey, Channel Islands to Southampton, Hampshire.
Thetis	Great Britain	The ship foundered in the North Sea off Sunderland, County Durham. She was on a voyage from Memel to London.
Thomas	Great Britain	The ship was wrecked on Gotland, Sweden. She was on a voyage from Saint Petersburg to Chepstow, Monmouthshire.
Union	Great Britain	The ship struck a rock and was wrecked in Galway Bay. She was on a voyage from Bristol to Newport Pratt, County Mayo, Ireland.
Union	Great Britain	The ship was lost near "Scawhaven". She was on a voyage from London to Hamburg.
Three unnamed vessels	Flags unknown	The ships were lost off the mouth of the Elbe. One vessel was on a voyage from Baltimore to Bremen.

== Unknown date ==
List of shipwrecks: Unknown date in 1796
Ship	State	Description
Ambuscade	Great Britain	The ship was driven ashore and wrecked on Green Island. She was on a voyage from Jamaica to London.
Ann	Great Britain	War of the First Coalition: The ship was captured by the privateer Droits d'Homme (France). She was sent in to Charleston, South Carolina, United States where she was lost.
Argonaut	France	The ship was lost at the Cape of Good Hope. She was on a voyage from Bordeaux, Gironde to Mauritius.
Baltimore	United States	The ship foundered on the Grand Banks of Newfoundland. Her crew were rescued. She was on a voyage from Liverpool, Lancashire, Great Britain to Baltimore, Maryland.
Betsey	Great Britain	The ship was wrecked on the Cat Key Reef while on a voyage from British Honduras to Jamaica.
Chance	Great Britain	War of the First Coalition The ship was captured and destroyed by the French in the Bay of Bulls.
Charleston	United States	The ship foundered in the Atlantic Ocean. She was on a voyage from Maryland to Rotterdam, Batavian Republic.
Connecticut	United States	The ship was lost in the Rio Nunas. She was on a voyage from Liverpool to Africa.
Deborah	United States	The brig foundered.
Eagle	United States	The ship was lost on Heneagua. She was on a voyage from Saint-Domingue to Baltimore.
Eagle	Great Britain	War of the First Coalition The transport ship was captured and burnt by a squadron of French frigates. She was on a voyage from London to Bermuda.
Eliza	Great Britain	The ship ran aground off "Newberry". She was on a voyage from Bristol, Gloucestershire to Boston.
Eliza	Great Britain	The ship sprang a leak and was abandoned in the Atlantic Ocean (52°N 15°W). Her crew were rescued by Briseis (Great Britain). Eliza was on a voyage from Jamaica to Liverpool.
Eliza	Great Britain	The ship capsized off the "Western Isles".
Elizabeth	Great Britain	The ship foundered in the Atlantic Ocean. She was on a voyage from Wiscasset, Maine, United States to Liverpool.
Elizabeth	Great Britain	The ship was wrecked in the Baltic Sea. She was on a voyage from Pernau, Russia to Liverpool.
Fair American	United States	The ship sank off Bembridge, Isle of Wight, Great Britain. She was refloated on 22 August and taken in to Portsmouth, Hampshire, Great Britain.
Favourite	Great Britain	The ship was lost near the mouth of the Delaware River. She was on a voyage from Cádiz, Spain to Philadelphia, Pennsylvania, United States.
Favourite	Great Britain	War of the First Coalition: The ship was captured by the French and was burnt. She was on a voyage from Liverpool to Virginia, United States.
Friendship	Great Britain	The ship was lost in the Bahamas. Her crew were rescued. She was on a voyage from the Bahamas to London.
Grampus	Great Britain	The ship brig was driven ashore south of Charleston, South Carolina
Hampden	Great Britain	War of the First Coalition: The ship was captured and destroyed by the French in the Bay of Bulls.
Henry & Charles	United States	The ship was driven ashore near the Delaware Capes. She was on a voyage from Philadelphia to Hamburg.
Hercules	Great Britain	The ship foundered in the Atlantic Ocean. Her crew were rescued by Rising Sun (Ireland). Hercules was on a voyage from Jamaica to London.
Hero	Great Britain	The ship foundered in the Atlantic Ocean. Her crew were rescued. She was on a voyage from Newfoundland to Gibraltar.
Hope	United States	The brig was lost near Cape Florida, New Spain. She was on a voyage from Havana, Cuba to an American port.
Hope	Great Britain	The ship was lost on the Pallisades, off the coast of Jamaica. She was on a voyage from Glasgow, Renfrewshire to Jamaica.
Industry	Great Britain	The ship was lost on a voyage that started at Havana.
Jamaica	Great Britain	War of the First Coalition: The ship was captured and beached on Saint Croix, Virgin Islands before 11 November. She was on a voyage from Tobago and Grenada to London.
Jolly Tar	Great Britain	The ship was driven ashore on the coast of Florida. She was on a voyage from Jamaica to Norfolk, Virginia, United States.
Jonge Bonefacius	Batavian Republic	The ship, a prize, was driven ashore in Simon's Bay, near the Cape of Good Hope.
Juliana	United States	The ship was lost at Nantucket, Massachusetts. She was on a voyage from Charleston to Boston, Massachusetts.
Juliana Maria	Danish Asiatic Company	The ship was destroyed by fire in the Indian Ocean. She was on a voyage from Bengal, India to Copenhagen.
Little Brymer	Great Britain	The ship foundered in the Atlantic Ocean. She was on a voyage from Halifax, Nova Scotia, British America to Jamaica.
Lively	Great Britain	The ship was lost off Antigua.
London	Great Britain	The ship was wrecked in Rapparee Cove, Devon.
Mackarel	Great Britain	The transport ship foundered in the Atlantic Ocean.
Maria	Great Britain	The transport ship was wrecked on the Ludberry Reef, in the Gulf of Florida.
Maria	Great Britain	The ship was lost at Port Royal, Jamaica. She was on a voyage from Port Royal to Exeter, Devon.
Milford	Great Britain	The ship foundered. Her crew were rescued. She was on a voyage from Newfoundland to Waterford, Ireland.
Minerva	Great Britain	The ship was lost near the mouth of the Delaware River with the loss of seven of her crew. She was on a voyage from Lisbon, Portugal to Philadelphia.
Mur	Great Britain	The ship was sunk by ice off Cape Race, Newfoundland, British America with the loss of two of her crew.
Nancy	United States	The ship was lost at Bermuda. she was on a voyage from Philadelphia to Jamaica.
Neptune	Great Britain	The ship was destroyed by an explosion at the Cape of Good Hope.
Old Dick	Great Britain	The ship was lost on Rocky Point, Jamaica. Her crew were rescued. She was on a voyage from Africa to Jamaica.
Othello	Great Britain	The ship was destroyed by fire in the Bonny River.
Parnassus	Great Britain	The transport was lost at Corsica in late 1796.
Peggy	Great Britain	The ship was lost on the American coast.
Polly	United States	The schooner was lost off Bermuda.
Ranger	Great Britain	The ship foundered in the Mediterranean Sea off Sicily while on a voyage from Naples, Kingdom of Sicily to London.
Ranger	Great Britain	The ship foundered in the Gulf of Finland. Her crew were rescued.
Regulator	Great Britain	War of the First Coalition: The ship was captured and destroyed by the French at Table Bay, Labrador, British America.
Sovereign	Great Britain	The ship foundered in the Atlantic Ocean. Her crew were rescued by Hebe (Great Britain). Sovereign was on a voyage from Quebec to London.
Thomas	Great Britain	The ship was lost in Morant Bay, Jamaica. She was on a voyage from Jamaica to Bristol.
Three Friends	Great Britain	War of the First Coalition: The ship was captured by the French at Newfoundland and was scuttled.
Trisviatitalia	Russia	The vessel was lost at Kamishak in Russian Alaska. After an attempt to repair her failed, she was burned in 1798 to retrieve her iron fittings.
Tryphena	Great Britain	War of the First Coalition: The ship was captured and sunk by a squadron under the command of Admiral Joseph de Richery. She was on a voyage from Newfoundland to Porto.
Two Brothers	Great Britain	The ship was wrecked on Hunting Island, South Carolina, United States. She was on a voyage from Liverpool to Savannah, Georgia, United States.
Yarico	Great Britain	War of the First Coalition: The ship was captured and sunk by the French. She was on a voyage from London to Quebec.
