= HMS Trompeuse =

Three ships of Britain's Royal Navy have borne the name HMS Trompeuse, after the French word for "deceptive":

- HMS Trompeuse (1794) was a former French 16-gun brig-sloop, launched in July 1793, that HMS Sphinx captured on 12 January 1794 near Cape Clear Island and that grounded off Kinsale on 15 July 1796. At the time of her loss all her crew were saved.
- HMS Trompeuse (1799) was a former French 18-gun privateer originally called Mercure, captured in 1799. She was commissioned in September 1799 and foundered on 17 May 1800 in the English Channel. All her crew were lost.
- HMS Trompeuse (1800) was the French privateer Coureur captured on 4 March 1800 and broken up in 1811.

== See also ==
- Trompeuse (ship)
