= Rapparee (disambiguation) =

A rapparee was Irish guerrilla fighters in the 1690s, and a name given to bandits and highwaymen in Ireland.

Rapparee may also refer to:

- Rapparee Cove, a cove near the town of Ilfracombe, north Devon, England
- FastCat Ryde, a high speed catamaran ferry renamed Rapparee
- The Rapparee, an 1870 play presented at Niblo's Garden
