= Trompeuse (ship) =

During the French Revolutionary War Trompeuse, meaning “misleading” or “deceptive”, was a popular name for French naval vessels, privateers, and even merchant vessels. Warships of the Royal Navy captured or destroyed at least four vessels under that name.

- On 12 January 1794, the post ship HMS Sphynx captured the 18-gun French Navy brig Trompeuse, which the Royal Navy took into service under her own name.
- In May 1797 HMS Spitfire, under the command of Captain Michael Seymour, captured the French schooner Trompeuse of six guns and 40 men. Trompeuse, of Morlaix, had been out five days and had taken two Prussian vessels, one sailing to Liverpool and the other to Oporto.
- On 17 September 1797, on the Jamaica station, HMS Pelican, with HMS Drake in sight, engaged and destroyed the French privateer Trompeuse, of 12 guns and 78 men.
- On 9 June 1801 the schooner HMS Gozo (misspelled as Gogo), captured the chasse maree Trompeuse, which was sailing to Ancona.

== See also ==
- HMS Trompeuse
