= Table Bay (disambiguation) =

Table Bay usually refers to Table Bay, a natural bay on the Atlantic Ocean overlooked by Cape Town, South Africa.

It may also refer to:

- Table Bay, Newfoundland and Labrador, a natural bay and former community on the coast of Labrador.
- Table Bay, Antarctica, a bay on Beardmore Glacier in the Queen Elizabeth Range or Antarctica
