= London (1764 ship) =

History

Great Britain
- Name: Polly
- Owner: John Mather
- Launched: 1764 at Shoreham
- Renamed: Irwin, Weir, and London (1784)
- Fate: Wrecked, 9 October 1796

General characteristics
- Tons burthen: 300 (bm)
- Armament: 1779: 16 × 4-pounder + 4 × 3-pounder guns; 1781: 6 × 4-pounder guns

London was a British merchant ship, built in 1764 in Sussex, England, as Polly, and later Irwin, Weir and London. She was wrecked near Ilfracombe on 9 October 1796 on a voyage from Saint Lucia bringing French prisoners of war as well as gold treasure. There is continuing international debate over the origin of bones found in a mass grave at the wreck site and, if determined, where they should be interred.

== Description ==
The ship was a wooden full-rigged British merchant vessel launched in 1764 at Shoreham, Sussex, as Polly. She was measured at 300 tons burthen (bm).

== Career ==
Polly was first listed in Lloyd's Register (LR) in 1764.

Year	Master	Owner	Trade	Source & notes
1764	Simon Lee	Smith	London–Barbados	LR
1768	Simon Lee	Rd.Smith	Barbados–London	LR

Between 1768 and 1776 Polly was renamed Irwin (or Irvine)

Year	Master	Owner	Trade	Source & notes
1776	Js.Smith	Muir & Co.	London–Boston	LR

In 1777 Irwin was renamed Weir. In 1779 she was armed with 16 × 4-pounder + 4 × 3-pounder guns but by 1781 reduced to 6 × 3-pdrs.

Year	Master	Owner	Trade	Source & notes
1778	S.Williams	Js.Mather	London–Hallifax	LR;repair 1777
1779	S.Williams; R.Moulton	J.Mather	Honduras–London; London transport	LR; repair 1777
1783	J.Robertson	Mather	Barbados–London; London–Halifax	LR; repair 1777
1784	J.Robertson	J.Mather	Cork transport	LR; repair 1777

In 1784 Weir was renamed London and by then registered at London.

Year	Master	Owner	Trade	Source & notes
1784	W.Reid	Js.Mather	London–Jamaica	LR
1789	Robertson	Mather	London	LR; thorough repair 1786
1795	Robertson	Mather	London–Honduras	LR; thorough repair 1786 & good repair 1789; Chartered to the Admiralty

== Wreck and controversy ==
London, Robertson, master, was driven onto the rocks at Rapparee Cove, near Ilfracombe, Devon, on 9 October 1796 in stormy weather while returning from Saint Kitts, carrying a number of black French prisoners from Saint Lucia. About 50 prisoners were reported drowned, but others reached shore. Four of five chests of gold and silver coins were recovered.

In the 1790s African slaves in the French West Indies colonies were freed, and many were enlisted into the army to serve alongside mixed-race and European troops in the war with Britain for control of the islands. On Saint Lucia the garrison at Fort Charlotte, Castries, surrendered in May 1796 and over 2000 mostly Black and mixed race French soldiers, and some women and children, were transported as prisoners of war, in over 100 ships, to Portsmouth, arriving in October. London was part of that fleet, but bad weather pushed her off course.

In 1997 a mass grave was discovered at Rapparee Cove, including bones still bearing manacles. Some bones were analysed at Exeter University by archeologist Mark Horton but that was inconclusive and was not published. Dr Horton said in 2007 that he did not believe that those bones came from black slaves, but more likely from soldiers from France, or even Devon locals; adding that it was possible to re-examine them in the light of developments in DNA analysis. The debate has continued over whether there should be further analysis and, if the origins can be confirmed, what should happen to the remains.
