= HMS Spitfire (1782) =

Brig of the Royal Navy

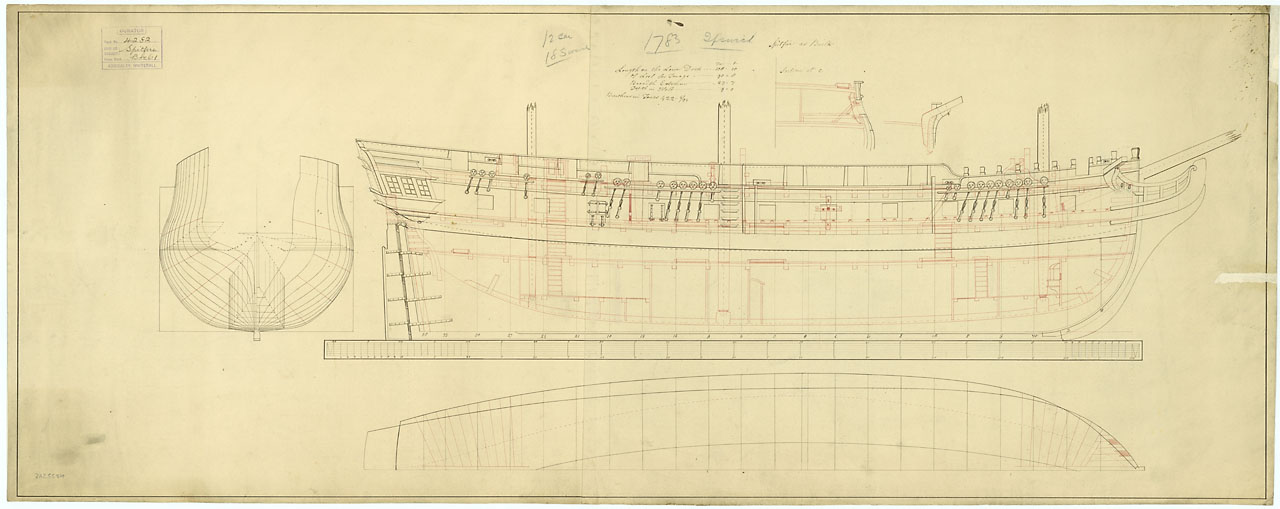
- Spitfire

History

Great Britain
- Name: HMS Spitfire
- Ordered: 28 November 1780
- Builder: Stephen Teague, Ipswich
- Laid down: December 1780
- Launched: 19 March 1782
- Completed: By 18 July 1782
- Fate: Sold for breaking up on 30 July 1825

General characteristics
- Class & type: Tisiphone-class fireship
- Tons burthen: 4226/94 (bm)
- Length: 108 ft 10 in (33.2 m) (overall); 90 ft 8 in (27.6 m) (keel)
- Beam: 29 ft 7 in (9.0 m)
- Depth of hold: 9 ft (2.7 m)
- Propulsion: Sails
- Sail plan: Brig
- Complement: 55 (as fireship); 121 (as sloop)
- Armament: As fireship: 8 × 12-pounder guns; As sloop: 14 × 18-pounder carronades; 2 × 6-pounder guns; 4 × swivel guns

HMS Spitfire was a Tisiphone-class fireship of the Royal Navy. She served during the years of peace following the end of the American War of Independence, and by the outbreak of the French Revolutionary Wars, had been reclassified as a 14-gun sloop-of-war. Spitfire went on to serve under a number of notable commanders during a successful career that saw her capture a considerable number of French privateers and small naval vessels. She spent most of her career in Home waters, though during the later part of her life she sailed further afield, to the British stations in North America and West Africa. She survived the Napoleonic Wars and was eventually sold in 1825 after a period spent laid up.

== Early career ==
Spitfire was built at the yards of Stephen Teague, of Ipswich, and was launched on 19 March 1782. (Note: J. J. Colledge in the 2006 edition of Ships of the Royal Navy lists a launch date of 19 March 1783. This appears to be a typographical error, as other works show a launch date of 19 March 1782, and officers commissioned as commanders throughout 1782.) She had been completed at Sheerness by 18 July 1782, having been first commissioned in March that year under Commander Robert Mostyn, for service in the English Channel. He was succeeded by Commander Thomas Byard in November, and he by Commander Charles Bartholomew in January 1783. Spitfire was paid off in April that year and spent a period laid up in ordinary at Sheerness, briefly being refitted for a period of service in 1790 under the command of Commander Robert Watson. Spitfire was then paid off again. More extensive work was carried out the following year, and she recommissioned in March 1791 under Commander Thomas Fremantle. Fremantle commanded her until her paying off in September that year, upon which she was almost immediately recommissioned as a sloop under Commander John Woodley. She served under Woodley in the Irish Sea and the English Channel until Commander Philip Charles Durham succeeded him on 12 February 1793.

== French Revolutionary Wars ==
Durham went on to enjoy considerable success during his brief stint in command during the early months of the French Revolutionary Wars. On 13 February 1793, he captured the privateer cutter Affrique (or Afrique), of Le Havre. Affrique was a small vessel of only 22 tons (bm). She carried six swivel guns, twelve stand of small arms, fifty pistols, and 25 swords, all for a crew of 21 men. The capture of Affrique was the first capture of a vessel flying La tricolore. For this feat Lloyd's of London gave him a piece of plate worth 100 guineas, or £300 pounds, their first such award of the war.

On 19 February 1793, Durham sent off his boats against a privateer sloop and two other sloops near Treeport, about a dozen miles north-east of Dieppe. The fire from some 2,000 troops ashore with field pieces made it impossible to bring the prizes off but the British managed to knock the privateer to pieces and stove in and set fire to the other two vessels, one of which was carrying a cargo of fine brandy.

In the following month Spitfire captured the privateer St Jean and burnt the merchant vessel Marguerite. On 27 April, Spitfire fell in with two French armed brigs, one of 16 guns and the other of 12. Spitfire and the brigs exchanged fire for half an hour under the fort at Cherbourg, which contributed her fire to the encounter. The brigs fled into the harbour and Spitfire let them go rather than risk grounding. Despite the cannonading that she had been subject to, Spitfire suffered no damage or casualties.

Spitfire recaptured the galiot Two Brothers in May.

Durham was promoted to post captain on the frigate Narcissus on 24 June, and Commander James Cook replaced him on Spitfire. Cook's death by drowning in January 1794 necessitated the assigning of Commander John Clements to command Spitfire. (Note: Cook was eldest and only surviving son of the celebrated navigator Captain James Cook. James Cook, the younger, was in a boat at Poole with eight crewmen. The boat and Cook's body were found close together near the Isle of Wight but there was no trace of the other eight men.)

Commander Amherst Morris succeeded Clements in October. In 1796 Commander Michael Seymour replaced Morris.

=== Commander Michael Seymour ===
Seymour would spend the next four years as Spitfire's commander and, like Durham before him, enjoyed considerable success in actions against small French raiders. He captured at least nine privateers and small vessels of the French Navy.

In September and October Spitfire captured a number of merchant vessels, one being particularly valuable. On 2 September, she captured the Danish ship Sobestern. On 15 September Spitfire captured Concordia. (Note: In December 1798 the prize agents reported that the prize money for the vessel amounted to £4,000. Seymour's share of at least one-fourth would have amounted to £1,000, an amount equal to more than six years' salary. Then in February 1799, Spitfire received a second payment of prize money, this one of £2,000. There was a third and final payment in May 1800.) Thirteen days later, Spitfire captured the Danish brig Apollo. Then on 4 October Spitfire captured Argos, and two days later Jacoba.

Spitfire was active off the English and Irish coasts during the French attempt to invade Ireland in early 1797 and on 12 January 1797, about 30 leagues west of Ushant, she captured Allègre (or Allegrer), one of the expedition's storeships. Allègre was a brig of 200 tons (bm), and was carrying ammunition and entrenching tools.

Seymour followed this success by capturing the privateer cutter Bons Amis, of six guns and 32 men, off the Eddystone on 2 April 1797, and after a five-hour chase. She had been out three days and had not made any captures. Bons Amis was the former Friends Endeavour, of Fowey.

Next, Seymour captured the privateer brig Aimable Manette in the Channel on 1 May 1797, after an eight-hour chase. She was armed with 14 guns and had a crew of 69 men. She was a new vessel, half coppered, and beautiful. She had been out 13 days, and not only had she not taken anything, the evening before she had encountered an outward-bound English yellow-sided ship armed with sixteen 9-pounder guns. The engagement had cost Aimable Manette 15 men killed and wounded and forced her to sheer-off.

Then Spitfire captured the privateer schooner Trompeuse, of Morlaix, later that month. Trompeuse was armed with six guns and had a crew of 40 men. Trompeuse had been out five days and had taken two Prussian vessels from Embden, one sailing to Liverpool and the other to Oporto. Spitfire had also been in sight when HMS Unite recaptured a brig. Spitfire also recaptured the Rodney and Hannah.

In July, Spitfire captured the ship Sally.

Seymour and Spitfire took the French privateer schooner Incroyable 13 leagues SW off the Lizard on 15 September. She was armed with three 6-pounder guns and had a crew of 31 men. She was 14 days out of Saint Malo but had captured nothing.

During the first half of 1798 Spitfire also captured the smuggling lugger Argus.

At the end of 1798, on 27 December, Spitfire recaptured Sybille, of Dartmouth, while in the Channel. The French privateer schooner Vigilant had captured Sybille on 25 December while Sybille was carrying bullocks and sheep to Guernsey for the troops there. She then had a narrow escape from Vigilant off Start Point while returning to Plymouth.

One week later Spitfire captured the 14-gun transport Wilding, of 400 tons (bm), in the Bay of Biscay. Wilding's crew consisted of seamen from three French ships of the line and she had been taking firewood for the French Navy from Aber Wrac'h to Brest under the escort of Levrette, a gun vessel from which she had parted company. Wilding had been a British ship in the West Indies trade before the French had captured her.

On 15 March 1799, the prize agent, J. Hawker esq., paid Spitfire's foremast men nearly £40 each. One man not only spent it in two days but ended up owing his landlady 15 guineas. (This money may have been prize money for Concordia.)

On 31 March 1799, Spitfire took the privateer brig Résolue of St. Malo, 14 leagues off Scilly during a violent gale. She was armed with fourteen 6 and 8-pounder guns, and had a crew of 65 men. She was a new vessel, out two days from Saint Malo on her first cruise, and had made no captures. Her owners also owned Hirondelle, which the ill-fated Telegraph had captured in a notable fight.

On 12 April, orders arrived at Plymouth for Seagull to take on board 183 French prisoners from Ethalion and Spitfire for onward conveyance to Portsmouth.

On 9 May Spitfire brought a smuggling lugger called Providence into Plymouth. The lugger had a cargo of 90 ankers of spirits and 26 bales of tobacco.

Later that month Arethusa came upon seven enemy vessels which made to engage her, but then turned away when she sailed towards them in "a spirited style". Arethusa captured one, an armed ship, which was carrying sundries from Saint-Domingue. Spitfire took the prize into Plymouth on the 23rd while Arethusa sailed off in search of the other six.

On 28 June Jupiter, Monk, master, arrived at Plymouth. She had been sailing from Surinam to Copenhagen with sugar and coffee, supposedly Dutch property, when Spitfire detained her.

In September, Spitfire convoyed the linen fleet from Belfast to The Downs. On 3 November, she brought into Plymouth the Guernsey smuggling lugger Endeavour, with her cargo of 299 ankers of spirits and 23 bales of tobacco.

Spitfire and the cutter Sprightly captured the brig Gute Hoffnung. In December 1799 Spitfire captured the Danish ship Twilling Riget.

On 22 January 1800 Spitfire came in from Kinsale to Plymouth with a Danish vessel, Havel Rerli, with a cargo of spices and the like, from Batavia. The cargo was worth £150,000 and supposed to be Dutch property. Five more vessels were reported to be following.

On 16 April 1800, a French privateer in the Channel plundered the American vessel A. B. C. two hours before Spitfire boarded her. When A.B.C. reported the privateer, Seymour left A.B.C. to make her own way into Plymouth and set off in pursuit. A.B.C. arrived at Plymouth on 19 April.

Early in the morning of 17 April 1800, Spitfire was nine leagues south of the Bolt Head when she sighted a brig. She gave chase, a chase that a Guernsey privateer and Diamond joined until by noon Spitfire had left them behind and out of sight. Then Telegraph, from under Alderney, came up and fired a broadside at the quarry, but then too fell behind. At 2p.m. Spitfire finally captured the privateer about four leagues from Cape Levy on the French coast. The privateer was Heureuse Societé of Pleinpont, of 14 guns and 64 men. She was a new vessel that had been out only three days and had made no captures. Spitfire later shared the prize money with Telegraph. Spitfire brought Heureuse Societé into Plymouth on 20 April.

Spitfire captured a French privateer brig Heureux Courier, of Granville on 19 June, ten leagues SSE of Scilly. The privateer was armed with sixteen brass French 6-pounders and had a crew of 54 men, others being away on the three captures she had made. She was on her way home from her first cruise. Her three captures were two Newfoundland brigs and a Portuguese schooner, Nostra Senora del Carno, De Casta Pinto, master. The privateer had cut out the schooner at St. Michael's (probably St Michael's Mount), where the schooner was loading. The British privateer Tartar, of Guernsey, recaptured the schooner.

In May Spitfire sailed through a severe gale on the 16th to arrive safely in Guernsey. The gale had set several vessels, including Telegraph on their sides, but none were lost.

Spitfire returned to Plymouth on 14 July from a cruise off the Île de Batz. She then sailed to cruise against smugglers and captured the lugger Three Friends, with 150 ankers of spirits. Three Friends had landed part of her cargo at Polperro. Spitfire took several boats that were endeavouring to escape, in the process killing one smuggler. She brought Three Friends into Plymouth on 4 August.

On 11 August Seymour received a promotion to post-captain.

=== Commander Robert Keen ===
Seymour's replacement on Spitfire was Commander Robert Keen, who spent the next four years on the Irish station.

On 13 December 1800 Spitfire, Suffisante (1793), Renard, and cutter Swift (2) shared in the recapture of Defiance.

On 25 December, Spitfire and Renard captured the Danish galiot Palmboom. That month Spitfire also captured Vrouw Elizabeth.

Suffisante and Spitfire shared the proceeds of the recapture of the brig Honduras Packet. Honduras Packet (or Honduras Planter), of eight guns and 16 men under the command of Captain J. Goodwin, had been sailing from London to New Providence. A French privateer, of fourteen guns and 125 men, captured her after an action of one hour and a quarter. Spitfire recaptured her on 18 February 1801, off Abervrac and she arrived at Plymouth four days later. Spitfire arrived the next day.

During 20 to 21 March, a hurricane blew in the Channel. Even so, Spitfire, Suffisante, and Renard arrived safely in Jersey.

Spitfire and Renard shared in the proceeds of the capture on 25 April, of Prince Frederick van Prussia. On 26 May, Spitfire and Rambler captured a French brig of unknown name carrying a cargo of rye.

In July, a court martial on board HMS Cambridge in the Hamoaze tried Spitfire's purser, Mr. Banfield, for disobeying Keen's orders. The charge was fully proven, however several naval officers testified to Banfield's excellent character; the board reinstated him as purser but ordered him mulcted of a year's pay.

On 11 July, Spitfire captured Commerce. Then in August Spitfire captured St. Esprit and a sloop of unknown name, as well as a chasse maree carrying "310 Burr Stones". Lastly, on 2 September, she captured Betsey.

Towards the end of September Spitfire detained the American merchantman Robust, on passage from Baltimore to Amsterdam, off the Eddystone. Kean put a mate and six men on board as a prize crew and sent her to Plymouth. On the way, while three men were aloft trimming the sails, two in the hold stowing the cable tier, one at the helm, and the prize-master having breakfast, the Americans, armed with pistols, seized the steersman and the prize master. The Americans threatened to shoot the men aloft and below if the prize crew did not give up the ship. The Americans put the prize crew into a boat, and after a long pull the seven men reached Salcombe. Robust resumed her voyage, reaching Amsterdam.

On 3 October, Spitfire brought Anna, Gildea, master, bound for Philadelphia from Amsterdam, into Plymouth. Anna, was carrying supposed Dutch property.

Then on 12 November, Spitfire arrived at Plymouth where an order was in effect that as vessels came in their crews were to be paid off and their sails furled. Spitfire, however, remained in service on the Milford and Irish stations. After Keen arrived, he reported that he had encountered a French convoy of 30 vessels off Havre, under the escort of a gun-brig. Spitfire did not engage as hostilities had ended two days earlier.

On 17 January 1802 Spitfire and Weasel were ordered to fit-out and victual for foreign service, Spitfire for the West Indies and Weazel for the Mediterranean. It was assumed that they would carry with them copies of the definitive peace treaty.

On 21 January a messenger came by express from the Admiralty to Plymouth with orders for a fast sloop to be ready to sail at a moment's notice with dispatches for the Straits. Weazle and Spitfire went out into the Sound, still very rough from a gale the previous night, to await orders. The dispatches arrived in the morning three days later and Weazle sailed immediately. Spitfire's orders, however, did not come.

Spitfire had to wait for orders until 6 February. The next morning she, Hunter, and two gun-brigs sailed for the St. Georges Channel to intercept smugglers.

In early 1802, Spitfire recaptured the brig Lowestoffe.

On 19 March 1803 Admiral Lord Keith hoisted his pennant aboard Culloden as commander in chief of the fleet. Admiral Dacres, second in command of the fleet and port admiral, shifted his flag to Spitfire.

On 9 April Keen again recommissioned Spitfire in the Hamoaze. Before she could sail, however, she had to have her bottom examined. By 4 May she was completely rigged and fitted for sea, but lacked a full crew. War with France resumed on 22 May.

On 2 March Spitfire escorted a convoy that was leaving Waterford for Newfoundland. That same night two vessels from the convoy, Ranger and Mary Ann, separated in the night in a heavy squall. Four days later the French privateer General Aujereau, of Bayonne, and of 16 guns and 120 men, captured them about 120 miles west of Cape Clear. The privateer plundered Ranger and then released her; she returned to Waterford on the 10th. The privateer sent Mary Ann into France or Spain.

Spitfire was paid off and laid up in ordinary at Sheerness on 30 August 1804, and she remained out of commission through 1805.

== Napoleonic Wars ==
Spitfire underwent a repair and refit at Sheerness between April 1805 and April 1806, returning to active service under Captain William Green.

While in the Channel under the command of Lieutenant R. Parry (acting), on 28 December she recaptured the English trading brig Friendship, from Mogadore that the French privateer luggers Deux Freres and Espoir had captured, and sent her in to the Downs. The next day Spitfire captured Deux Frères, which had only four of her 14 guns mounted, the rest being stored in her hold. She nevertheless put up a fight and did not surrender till she had lost her captain, H. Trebon, and her third officer killed, and four men wounded out of her crew of 55. (Spitfire's surgeon had to amputate the arm of one of the wounded men.) Spitfire was unable to rescue Friendship's master and crew as they were on Espoir, which escaped. Spitfire was then paid off.

Commander Henry Samuel Butt recommissioned her again in February 1807, in her original role as a fireship. She served in the Downs, at first under Butt, and then from mid-1807 under Commander John Ellis. Ellis would eventually spend six years with Spitfire, serving at a number of British ports and spending some time in North American waters, including the Greenland station in 1813.

In 1814, Spitfire received a grant from His Royal Highness, the Prince Regent, for what should have been her share of Danish ships detained at Sheerness between 26 and 29 August and on 1 September 1807 on the outbreak of war with Denmark. Ellis and Spitfire had been omitted from the original grant. (Note: A first-class share, i.e., Ellis's share, was worth £152 17s 1¼d; a fifth-class share, that of a seaman, was worth 11s 1½d.)

On 4 June, Spitfire 1808 captured Alexis, Rebecca Angel, and Duen.

On 22 October 1808, Spitfire and Basilisk (1801) sailed to the assistance of the sloop Cygnet, which the Dowlaw signal station, near Dunbar, reported had cut away her masts and bowsprit and thrown some of her guns overboard. Basilisk and Spitfire brought Cygnet back to Leith Roads.

On 29 June 1809, Spitfire captured Wilhelmina Fredericka.

Ellis sailed Spitfire from Leith on 23 May 1810, escorting a convoy to Quebec.

On 11 January 1811, Ellis and Spitfire towed into port Economy, which had fought off or out-sailed several privateers, lost her rudder in a gale, and was trying to steer by sails.

Spitfire, Surveillante, and Sybille (Sybelle), shared in the capture on 28 January 1812, of the American vessel Zone.

Lastly, when news of the outbreak of the War of 1812 reached Britain, the Royal Navy seized all American vessels then in British ports. Spitfire was among the Royal Navy vessels then lying at Spithead or Portsmouth and so entitled to share in the grant for the American ships Belleville, Janus, Aeos, Ganges, and Leonidas seized there on 31 July 1812. (Note: A first-class share was worth £20 19s 0d; a sixth-class share, that of an ordinary seaman, was worth 4s 1d; the Commander in Chief received £230 10s 8d.)

Spitfire was in company with Galatea on 18 April 1813, when they recaptured the brig Fermina.

Spitfire was cruising with the 32-gun frigate Alexandria on 19 July 1813, off North Cape. There they chased the 44-gun American frigate USS President and her consort, the privateer schooner Scourge, away from a British convoy out of Archangel. Captain John Rodgers of President excused his fleeing the British by claiming that he had fled from a ship of the line and a frigate.

On 14 June 1814 Spitfire recaptured Hugh Jones. (Note: A first-class share was worth £180 10s 1d; a sixth-class share was worth £2 10s 4d.) Hugh Jones, Thomas, master, had been sailing from Belfast to Guadeloupe when a privateer had captured her. Hugh Jones arrived at Plymouth on 7 July.

== Post-war ==
Commander James Dalton took over in 1814. Spitfire arrived on the West African coast in January, under the command of Commander John Ellis, to join the West Africa Squadron. When she arrived, Captain John Maxwell, captain of the sloop HMS Favorite and governor of the Sierra Leone station, sent Spitfire to the Gallinas River where an English slave trader called Crawford was working with a Spanish schooner carrying slaves that Crawford had gathered. The schooner had captured the British privateer Kitty and murdered John Roach, her master. The Spaniards plundered Kitty before scuttling her. The schooner also enslaved the black crew on Kitty, including two freed Negroes from Sierra Leone, and sold them into slavery at Havana. On 22 February Spitfire's boats narrowly missed capturing Crawford, though they were able to seize his trade goods and free Kitty's crew.

In April, Spitfire engaged in an unsuccessful chase of an American privateer sailing under British colours.

== Fate ==
Spitfire returned to Britain in 1815, where she was paid off for the final time and laid up at Portsmouth in May. She remained at Portsmouth in ordinary for the next ten years. Some records report that she served as a prison hulk at Portsmouth between 1818 and 1820.

Finally, the "Principal Officers and Commissioners of His Majesty's Navy" offered the "Spitfire sloop, of 422 tons", "lying at Portsmouth", for sale on 11 July 1825. She was sold for breaking up to a Mr Ranwell for the sum of £1,205 on 30 July.
