= Rapparee Cove =

Cove near the town of Ilfracombe, north Devon, England

Coordinates: 51.2102°N 4.1085°W

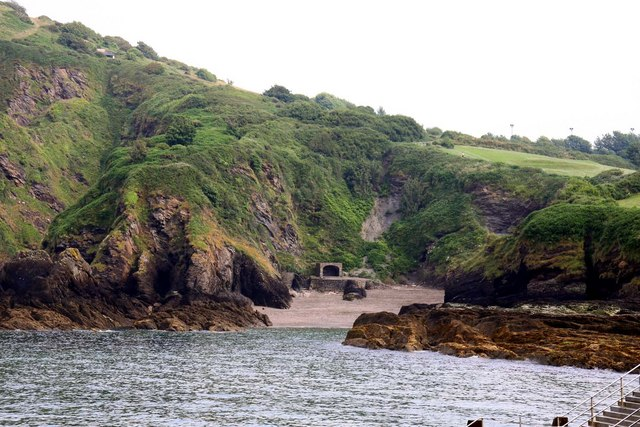

Rapparee is a cove in the North Devon town of Ilfracombe.

== Shipwreck ==
The cove is the site of the shipwreck of the transport London, which sank on 9 October 1796 in stormy weather. The ship's cargo reportedly contained gold and several African slaves who perished.

There is debate over whether the human remains from the shipwreck are those of French soldiers or enslaved Africans from St Lucia.
