= Table Bay, Newfoundland and Labrador =

Sea bay and former settlement in Newfoundland and Labrador, Canada

Coordinates: 53.693°N 56.705°W

Location of Table Bay in Newfoundland and Labrador

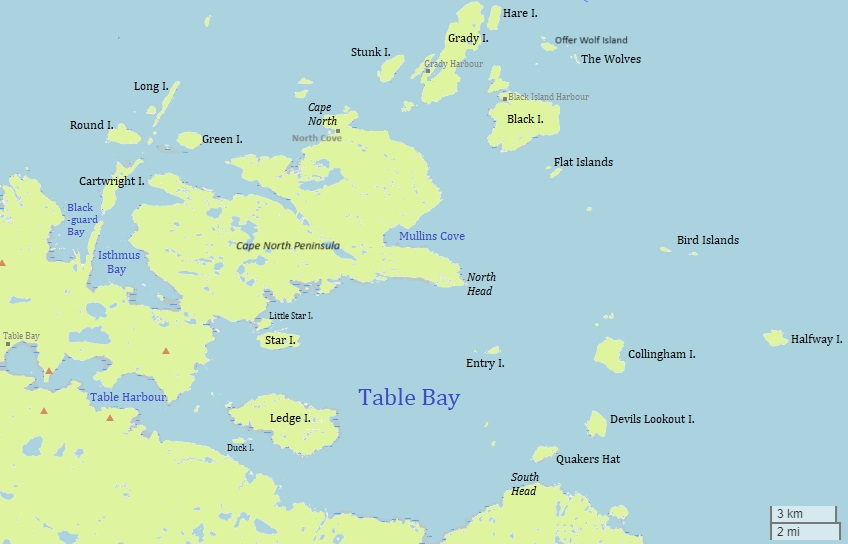
Map of Table Bay and vicinity

Table Bay is a natural bay and former community on the coast of Labrador in the province of Newfoundland and Labrador, Canada. It drains into the Labrador Sea to the east.

== History ==
Table Bay is also the name of a former settlement on the coast of the bay.

In October 1796, Table Bay was the site of the sinking of the British ship Regulator by the French Navy.
