= HMS Trompeuse (1794) =

Brig of the Royal Navy

History

France
- Name: Trompeuse
- Builder: Jean Fouache, Le Havre
- Launched: 17 July 1793
- Captured: 12 January 1794

Great Britain
- Name: HMS Trompeuse
- Acquired: 12 January 1794 by capture
- Fate: Wrecked 15 July 1796

General characteristics
- Tons burthen: 342 (bm)
- Length: Overall:91 ft 9 in (28.0 m); Keel:73 ft 0 3/4 in (22.3 m)
- Beam: 29 ft 7 1/2 in (9.0 m)
- Depth of hold: 11 ft 7 in (3.5 m)
- Complement: At capture:110; Royal Navy:110
- Armament: At capture:18 × 6-pounder guns; Royal Navy: April 1794:16 × 18-pounder carronades; July 1794:16 × 6-pounder guns

HMS Trompeuse was a former French 16-gun brig-sloop, launched in July 1793, that HMS Sphinx captured on 12 January 1794 near Cape Clear Island. The British Royal Navy took her into service. As HMS Trompeuse she captured a small privateer and then grounded off Kinsale in 1796.

== French brig ==
Trompeuse was being built as a privateer at Le Havre when the French Navy requisitioned her on the stocks and took her into service.

HMS Sphinx captured Trompeuse on 12 January 1794 near Cape Clear Island after a chase of about two hours and an engagement of 10 minutes or so. She was under the command of lieutenant de vaisseau Biller, who had been promoted from enseigne de vaisseau non entretenu while in command of Trompeuse.

== Royal Navy ==
The Royal Navy commissioned Trompeuse in May 1794 under John Erskine Douglas, who was promoted Commander into her. He was promoted to Post captain on 19 June 1795.

In August Commander Lucius Dawson took command of Trompeuse.

In 1796 Commander Joshua Rowley Watson took command of Trompeuse.

Vice-admiral Sir Robert Kingsmill, commander in chief of the Cork station, on 11 June 1796 sent Trompeuse from Cork to assist HMS Unicorn and her prize Tribune after the action of 8 June 1796. On the way Trompeuse sighted two brigs. The nearest was a collier that the farther away brig had captured. Trompeuse recaptured the collier and then set off in chase of the collier's captor. At 10p.m., 12 June, Trompeuse caught up with her quarry, which struck. The quarry was the privateer Eveille, of six guns (four of which she had thrown overboard during the chase), and 100 men. She was 10 days out of Brest, and had early in the morning taken a Newfoundland-bound brig. Trompeuse brought Eville into Cork. (Note: French records describe Éveillé as carrying 10 guns and 100 men. They attribute the capture to Kingsmill's flagship, HMS Engageante.)

Before she was captured, Eville had captured Sisters, Pugh, master, which had been sailing from Ross to Newfoundland. The collier Trompeuse had recaptured was Renown. (Note: Lloyd's Register (LR) shows Renown, of 196 tons (bm), with Cameron, master, Hunter, owner, and trade Greenock–Newfoundland.)

== Fate ==
Trompeuse grounded at Dudley Point off Kinsale on 15 July 1796. At the time of her loss all her crew were saved.
