= List of ship launches in 1781 =

The list of ship launches in 1781 includes a chronological list of some ships launched in 1781.

Date	Ship	Class	Builder	Location	Country	Notes							
5 January	Alexander	Privateer	James Hackett	Portsmouth, New Hampshire	United States	For Massachusetts State Navy.							
5 January	Blonde	Coquette-class corvette	Joseph-Marie-Blaise Coulomb	Toulon	Kingdom of France	For French Navy.							
20 January	Brune	Coquette-class corvette		Havre de Grâce	Kingdom of France	For French Navy.							
23 February	Illustre	Magnamine-class ship of the line		Rochefort	Kingdom of France	For French Navy.							
26 February	Santo Domingo	Fourth rate		Ferrol	Spain	For Spanish Navy.							
5 March	Belette	Coquette-class Corvette		Toulon	Kingdom of France	For French Navy.							
7 March	King George	Merchantman	Randall & Brent	River Thames	Great Britain	For Hudson's Bay Company.							
10 March	Dolphin	Roebuck-class ship	Nicholas Phillips	Chatham Dockyard	Great Britain	For Royal Navy.							
10 March	Lézard	Cerf-class cutter	Daniel & Jacques Denys	Dunkirk	Kingdom of France	For French Navy.							
12 March	Assistance	Portland-class ship of the line	Peter Baker	Liverpool	Great Britain	For Royal Navy.							
12 March	Malin	Cert-class cutter		Dunkirk	Kingdom of France	For French Navy.							
13 March	Earl of Chesterfield	East Indiaman	John Perry	Blackwall	Great Britain	For British East India Company.							
13 March	Earl of Hertford	East Indiaman	John Perry	Blackwall	Great Britain	For British East India Company.							
13 March	Latona	Fifth rate	Edward Greaves	Limehouse	Great Britain	For Royal Navy.							
22 March	Poulette	Coquette-class corvette		Toulon	Kingdom of France	For French Navy.							
26 March	Deptford	East Indiaman	John Wells	Deptford	Great Britain	For British East India Company.							
26 March	Eurydice	Porcupine-class post ship	Nicholas Phillips & George White	Portsmouth Dockyard	Great Britain	For Royal Navy.							
10 April	Agamemnon	Ardent-class ship of the line	Henry Adams	Bucklers Hard	Great Britain	For Royal Navy.							
10 April	Arethusa	Minerva-class frigate	Hilhouse	Bristol	Great Britain	For Royal Navy.							
10 April	Perseverance	Fifth rate	John Randall & Co.	Rotherhithe	Great Britain	For Royal Navy.							
10 April	Success	Amazon-class frigate	John Sutton	Liverpool	Great Britain	For Royal Navy.							
11 April	Africa	Inflexible-class ship of the line	Adams & Barnard	Deptford	Great Britain	For Royal Navy.							
12 April	Hercules	Third rate	Jacob Spaan	Dordrecht	Dutch Republic	For Dutch Navy.							
24 April	Crocodile	Porcupine-class post ship	George White	Portsmouth Dockyard	Great Britain	For Royal Navy.							
1 May	Pallas	Frigate	P. Glavimans	Harlingen	Dutch Republic	For Dutch Navy.							
1 May	Santa Sabina	Fifth rate		Ferrol	Spain	For Spanish Navy.							
8 May	Sampson	Intrepid-class ship of the line	John Jenner	Woolwich Dockyard	Great Britain	For Royal Navy.							
9 May	Narcissus	Sphinx-class post ship		Plymouth Dockyard	Great Britain	For Royal Navy.							
9 May	Tisiphone	Tisiphone-class fireship	Henry Ladd	Dover	Great Britain	For Royal Navy.							
22 May	Nadezhda	Modified Pavel-class frigate	M. D. Portnov	Arkhangelsk	Russia	For Imperial Russian Navy.							
22 May	Podrazhislav	Modified Pavel-class frigate	M. D. Portnov	Arkhangelsk	Russia	For Imperial Russian Navy.							
22 May	Slava	Modified Pavel-class frigate	M. D. Portnov	Arkhangelsk	Russia	For Imperial Russian Navy.							
22 May	Sviatoslav	Aziia-class ship of the line	M. D. Portnov	Arkhangelsk	Russia	For Imperial Russian Navy.							
22 May	Trekh Sviatitelei	Aziia-class ship of the line	M. D. Portnov	Arkhangelsk	Russia	For Imperial Russian Navy.	24 May	Quebec	Active-class frigate	George Parsons	Bursledon	Great Britain	For Royal Navy.
26 May	Alecto	Tisiphone-class fireship	Thomas King	Dover	Great Britain	For Royal Navy.							
May	Pigmy	Unrated Alert-class Cutter (boat)	Thomas King	Dover	Great Britain	For Royal Navy.							
5 June	Argonaute	Argonaute-class ship of the line	Jean-Denis Chevilard	Rochefort	Kingdom of France	For French Navy.							
6 June	Brave	Argonaute-class ship of the line	Jean-Denis Chevillard	Rochefort	Kingdom of France	For French Navy.							
7 June	Argo	Roebuck-class ship	John Baker & Co.	Newcastle upon Tyne	Great Britain	For Royal Navy.							
8 June	Chameau	Dromadaire-class Flûte (ship)		Havre de Grâce	Kingdom of France	For French Navy.							
8 June	Sceptre	Inflexible-class ship of the line	John Randall	Rotherhithe	Great Britain	For Royal Navy.							
9 June	Myrmidon	Sixth rate	Adam Hayes	Deptford Dockyard	Great Britain	For Royal Navy.							
22 June	Espion	Levrette-class cutter	Daniel & Jacques Denys	Dunkirk	Kingdom of France	For French Navy.							
22 June	San Felipe Apóstol	Fourth rate		Ferrol	Spain	For Spanish Navy.							
23 June	Fanfaron	Cerf-class Cutter (boat)		Dunkirk	Kingdom of France	For French Navy.							
3 July	Cockatrice	Alert-class cutter	Thomas King	Dover	Great Britain	For Royal Navy.							
8 July	Kortenaer	Third rate		Rotterdam	Dutch Republic	For Dutch Navy.							
13 July	Dutton	East Indiaman	John Barnard	Deptford	Great Britain	For British East India Company.							
24 July	Astraea	Active-class frigate	Robert Fabian	East Cowes	Great Britain	For Royal Navy.							
14 August	Durance	Rhône-class flûte (ship)		Toulon	Kingdom of France	For French Navy.							
19 August	Cléopâtre	Vénus-class frigate	Benjamin Dubois	Saint-Malo	Kingdom of France	For French Navy.							
22 August	Warren Hastings	East Indiaman	Barnard	Deptford	Great Britain	For British East India Company.							
August	Couronne	Saint-Esprit-class ship of the line		Brest	Kingdom of France	For French Navy.							
4 September	Anson	Intrepid-class ship of the line	John Henslow	Plymouth Dockyard	Great Britain	For Royal Navy.							
19 September	Ceres	Active-class frigate	Webb Fearon	Liverpool	Great Britain	For Royal Navy.							
15 October	Pégase	Pégase-class ship of the line		Brest	Kingdom of France	For French Navy.							
18 October	Ariel	Zebra-class sloop	Peter Baker	Liverpool	Great Britain	For Royal Navy.							
18 October	Diomede	Roebuck-class ship	Hilhouse	Bristol	Great Britain	For Royal Navy.							
18 October	Warrior	Alfred-class ship of the line	George White	Portsmouth Dockyard	Great Britain	For Royal Navy.							
19 October	Goliath	Arrogant-class ship of the line	Adam Hayes	Deptford Dockyard	Great Britain	For Royal Navy.							
29 October	Iris	Magicienne-class frigate	Joseph-Marie-Blaise Coulomb	Toulon	Kingdom of France	For French Navy.							
October	Racehorse	Sloop of war	John Fisher	Liverpool	Great Britain	For Royal Navy.							
October	Swallow	Cutter	Robert Fabian	East Cowes	Great Britain	For Royal Navy.							
4 November	Gektor	Sixth rate	I. V. James	Saint Petersburg	Russia	For Imperial Russian Navy.							
4 November	Provornyi	Evangelist Mark-class frigate	I. V. James	Saint Petersburg	Russia	For Imperial Russian Navy.							
17 November	Andromache	Amazon-class frigate	William Barnard	Deptford	Great Britain	For Royal Navy.							
16 December	Harlingen	Fifth rate	J. Swerus	Harlingen	Dutch Republic	For Dutch Navy.							
December	Autruche	Dromadaire-class Flûte (ship)		Havre de Grâce	Kingdom of France	For French Navy.							
December	Lourde	Dromadaire-class Flûte (ship)		Havre de Grâce	Kingdom of France	For French Navy.							
Unknown date	Achilles	Merchantman		Sunderland	Great Britain	For Michael Humble and Stephen Todd.							
Unknown date	Ann and Amelia	Merchantman	Fishburn & Brodrick	Whitby	Great Britain	For John Julius Angerstein.							
Unknown date	Belisarius	Privateer	Paul	Boston, Massachusetts	United States	For Massachusetts State Navy.							
Unknown date	Boddington	West Indiaman		River Thames	Great Britain	For Mr. Boddington.							
Unknown date	Braak	Cutter	P. van Zwijndregt	Rotterdam	Dutch Republic	For Dutch Navy.							
Unknown date	Brooks	Slave ship			Great Britain	For J. Brook.							
Unknown date	Centaurus	Fourth rate		Rotterdam	Dutch Republic	For Dutch Navy.							
Unknown date	Chambers	Merchantman			United States	For private owner.							
Unknown date	Duke of Atholl	East Indiaman	John Wells	Deptford	Great Britain	For British East India Company.							
Unknown date	Europa	East Indiaman	John Perry	Blackwall	Great Britain	For British East India Company.							
Unknown date	Expeditie	Frigate			Dutch Republic	For Dutch Navy.							
Unknown date	Faam	Uitlegger			Dutch Republic	For Dutch Navy.							
Unknown date	Fairford	East Indiaman	John Barnard	Rotherhithe	Great Britain	For British East India Company.							
Unknown date	Flying Fish	Ketch	Nicholas Bools	Bridport	Great Britain	For J. O'Neal.							
Unknown date	Gelderland	Third rate		Amsterdam	Dutch Republic	For Dutch Navy.							
Unknown date	General Coote	East Indiaman	Barnard		Great Britain	For British East India Company.							
Unknown date	Goes	Fourth rate		Vlissingen	Dutch Republic	For Dutch Navy.							
Unknown date	Grand Turk	Privateer	Thomas Barstow	Hanover, Massachusetts	United States	For Massachusetts State Navy.							
Unknown date	Grand Turk	Privateer			United States	For Virginia State Navy.							
Unknown date	Hector	West Indiaman		Bristol	Great Britain	For John Maxse.							
Unknown date	Hercules	Privateer		Amsterdam	Dutch Republic	For private owner.							
Unknown date	Hercules	Sloop	Nicholas Bools	Bridport	Great Britain	For Mr. Bidgood.							
Unknown date	Inayet-i Hakk	Fourth rate		Constantinople	Ottoman Empire	For Ottoman Navy.							
Unknown date	Kemphaan	Aviso	P. van Zwijndrecht	Rotterdam	Dutch Republic	For Dutch Navy.							
Unknown date	Kent	East Indiaman	Wells	Deptford	Kingdom of Great Britain	For William Moffatt.							
Unknown date	La Marquise de St. Pern	Privateer		Saint-Malo	Kingdom of France	For private owner.							
Unknown date	La Royale	Privateer		Dunkirk	Kingdom of France	For private owner.							
Unknown date	Mars	Privateer			Dutch Republic	For private owner.							
Unknown date	Meeuw	Uitlegger			Dutch Republic	For Dutch Navy.							
Unknown date	Mercuur	Cutter			Dutch Republic	For Dutch Navy.							
Unknown date	Mentor	Merchantman		New England	United States	For private owner.							
Unknown date	Musette	Merchantman		Nantes	Kingdom of France	For private owner.							
Unknown date	Nimble	Merchantman		Folkestone	Great Britain	For private owner.							
Unknown date	Nimble	Cutter	Philemon Jacobs	Folkestone	Great Britain	For Royal Navy.							
Unknown date	Nonsuch	Merchantman		Calcutta	India	For John Canning & Henry Watson.							
Unknown date	Orange Valley	West Indiaman		Bristol	Great Britain	For private owner.							
Unknown date	Pollux	Fourth rate		Rotterdam	Dutch Republic	For Dutch Navy.							
Unknown date	Snelheid	Cutter		Rotterdam	Dutch Republic	For Dutch Navy.							
Unknown date	Snelheid	Cutter		Medemblik	Dutch Republic	For Dutch Navy.							
Unknown date	Unie	Third rate		Amsterdam	Dutch Republic	For Dutch Navy.							
Unknown date	Utrecht	Third rate		Amsterdam	Dutch Republic	For Dutch Navy.							
Unknown date	Virginia	Privateer			Great Britain	For private owner.							
Unknown date	Waakzaamheid	Uitlegger			Dutch Republic	For Dutch Navy.							
Unknown date	Wassenaar	Third rate	Zwindrecht	Rotterdam	Dutch Republic	For Dutch Navy.							
Unknown date	William and Ann	Merchantman		Whitby	Great Britain	For private owner.							
Unknown date	Windhond	Sixth rate			Dutch Republic	For Dutch Navy.							
Unknown date	Zeebaars	Unrated			Dutch Republic	For Dutch Navy.							
Unknown date	Zeemeeuw	Unrated			Dutch Republic	For Dutch Navy.							
Unknown date	Zephier	Cutter		Rotterdam	Dutch Republic	For Dutch Navy.							
Unknown date	Name unknown	Merchantman		Amsterdam	Dutch Republic	For private owner.							
Unknown date	Name unknown	West Indiaman			Kingdom of France	For private owner.							
Unknown date	Name unknown				Kingdom of France	For unknown owner.							
Unknown date	Name unknown	Merchantman			Kingdom of France	For private owner.							
Unknown date	Name unknown	Merchantman			United States	For private owner.							
Unknown date	Name unknown	Merchantman			United States	For private owner.							
Unknown date	Name unknown	Merchantman			United States	For private owner.							
Unknown date	Name unknown	Merchantman			Unknown	For private owner.							
