= List of ship launches in 1778 =

The list of ship launches in 1778 includes a chronological list of some ships launched in 1778.

Date	Ship	Class	Builder	Location	Country	Notes
28 February	Courageuse	Concorde-class frigate		Rochefort	Kingdom of France	For French Navy.
2 March	Hyaena	Porcupine-class post ship	John Fisher	Liverpool	Great Britain	For Royal Navy.
16 March	Résolue	Iphigénie-class frigate	Lemarchand	Saint-Malo	Kingdom of France	For French Navy.
26 March	Surveillante	Iphigénie-class frigate	Gilles Cambry	Lorient	Kingdom of France	For French Navy.
March	Junon	Charmante-class frigate		Rochefort	Kingdom of France	For French Navy.
Unknown date	Prudente	Iphigénie-class frigate	Marion Brillantais	Saint-Malo	Kingdom of France	For French Navy.
11 April	Angelica	Privateer			United States	For Massachusetts State Navy.
25 April	Vosmoi	Vosmoi-class frigate	S. I. Afanaseyev	Novokhoperskaya	Russia	For Imperial Russian Navy.
28 April	Hancock	Frigate	William & James K. Hackett	Amesbury, Massachusetts	United States	For Continental Navy.
28 April	Medea	Enterprise-class frigate	James Martin Hillhouse	Bristol	Great Britain	For Royal Navy.
28 April	Savage	Swan-class sloop	John Barnard	Ipswich	Great Britain	For Royal Navy.
11 May	Amazone	Iphigénie-class frigate	Fromy Dupuy	Saint-Malo	Kingdom of France	For French Navy.
13 May	Jupiter	Portland-class ship of the line	John Randall & Co.	Rotherhithe	Great Britain	For Royal Navy.
14 May	Janus	Roebuck-class ship	Robert Batson	Limehouse	Great Britain	For Royal Navy.
15 May	Alexander	Modified Pavel-class frigate	M. D. Portnov	Arkhangelsk	Russia	For Imperial Russian Navy.
15 May	Brilliante	Fifth rate	Giovanni Domenico Giacomazzi	Venice	Republic of Venice	For Venetian Navy.
15 May	Voin	Modified Pavel-class frigate	M. D. Portnov	Arkhangelsk	Russia	For Imperial Russian Navy.
21 May	Mariia	Pavel-class frigate	V.Gunion	Arkhangelsk	Russia	For Imperial Russian Navy.
26 May	Sirena	Fourth rate	Giovanni Domenico Giacomazzi	Venice	Republic of Venice	For Venetian Navy.
27 May	Nymph	Swan-class sloop	Israel Pownoll	Chatham Dockyard	Great Britain	For Royal Navy.
28 May	Amphitrite	Porcupine-class post ship	Adam Hayes	Deptford Dockyard	Great Britain	For Royal Navy.
May	Deane	Fifth rate		Nantes	Kingdom of France	For Continental Navy.
May	Santa Matilda	Fifth rate		Havana	(Spain) Cuba	For Spanish Navy.
18 June	Gentille	Iphigénie-class frigate	Beaurgard de Segray	Saint-Malo	Kingdom of France	For French Navy.
25 June	Penelope	Porcupine-class post ship	Peter Baker	Liverpool	Great Britain	For Royal Navy.
9 July	Gloire	Iphigénie-class frigate	Fromy Dupuy	Saint Malo	Kingdom of France	For French Navy.
28 July	Fortune	Swan-class sloop	Nicholas Phillips	Woolwich Dockyard	Great Britain	For Royal Navy.
1 August	Magicienne	Magicienne-class frigate		Toulon	Kingdom of France	For French Navy.
3 August	Expedition	Sprightly-class Cutter (boat)	Henry Ladd	Dover	Great Britain	For Royal Navy.
4 August	Sprightly	Sprightly-class Cutter (boat)	Thomas King	Dover	Great Britain	For Royal Navy.
10 August	Earl Talbot	East Indiaman	Perry	Blackwall	Great Britain	For British East India Company.
10 August	Resource	Enterprise-class frigate	John Randall & Co.	Rotherhithe	Great Britain	For Royal Navy.
20 August	Neptune	Third rate	Pierre-Augustin Lamothe Kercaradec	Brest	Kingdom of France	For French Navy.
22 August	Bellone	Iphigénie-class frigate		Saint-Malo	Kingdom of France	For French Navy.
22 August	Précieuse	Magicienne-class frigate	Joseph-Marie-Blaise Coulomb	Toulon	Kingdom of France	For French Navy.
24 August	Atlas	East Indiaman	John Perry	Blackwall Yard	Great Britain	For British East India Company.
27 August	Minorca	Xebec		Port Mahon	(Kingdom of Great Britain) Balearic Islands	For Royal Navy.
7 September	Childers	Childers-class brig-sloop	James Mentone & Son	Limehouse	Great Britain	For Royal Navy.
9 September	Fame	Privateer	King's Yard	Dublin	Ireland	For private owner.
18 September	Auguste	Ship of the line	Leon-Michel Guignace	Brest	Kingdom of France	For French Navy.
19 September	Scipion	Scipion-class ship of the line	François-Guillaume Clairain des Lauriers	Rochefort	Kingdom of France	For French Navy.
20 September	Médée	Iphigénie-class frigate	Leon-Michel Guignace	Saint-Malo	Kingdom of France	For French Navy.
22 September	Pomona	Enterprise-class frigate	Thomas Raymond	Southampton	Great Britain	For Royal Navy.
5 October	Annibal	Annibal-class ship of the line	Jacques-Noël Sané	Brest	Kingdom of France	For Royal Navy.
5 October	Hercule	Scipion-class ship of the line	François-Guillaume Clairain des Lauriers	Rochefort	Kingdom of France	For French Navy.
8 October	Alexander	Alfred-class ship of the line	Adam Hayes	Deptford Dockyard	Great Britain	For Royal Navy.
8 October	Charon	Fifth rate	John Barnard	Harwich	Great Britain	For Royal Navy.
22 October	Alfred	Alfred-class ship of the line	Joseph Harris, William Gray, & Israel Pownoll	Chatham Dockyard	Great Britain	For Royal Navy.
22 October	Ganges	East Indiaman	John Wells	Deptford	Great Britain	For British East India Company.
24 October	Fairy	Swan-class sloop	John Jenner	Sheerness Dockyard	Great Britain	For Royal Navy.
5 November	Pluton	Scipion-class ship of the line	François-Guillaume Clairain des Lauriers	Rochefort	Kingdom of France	For French Navy.
7 November	Delight	Swan-class sloop	Edward Greaves	Limehouse	Great Britain	For Royal Navy.
8 November	Confederacy	Frigate	Jedidiah Willetts	Norwich, Connecticut	United States	For Continental Navy.
13 November	Admiraal de Ruiter	Third rate	John May	Amsterdam	Dutch Republic	For Dutch Navy.
November	Mutin	Mutin-class Cutter (boat)		Dunkirk	Kingdom of France	For French Navy.
November	Pilote	Mutin-class Cutter (boat)	Jacques & Danie Denys	Dunkirk	Kingdom of France	For French Navy.
18 December	Bellona	Frigate	Mr. Pye	Stockton-on-Tees	Great Britain	For Royal Navy.
30 December	Héros	Third rate	Joseph-Marie-Blaise Coulomb	Toulon	Kingdom of France	For French Navy.
December	Tapageur	Mutin-class Cutter (boat)		Dunkirk	Kingdom of France	For French Navy.
Unknown date	Achille	Xebec			Republic of Venice	For Venetian Navy.
Unknown date	Américaine	Privateer			Kingdom of France	For Bretel, Ernouf & La Houssaye.
Unknown date	Amphion	Turuma	Djurgårdsvarvet	Stockholm	Sweden	For Gustav III.
Unknown date	Amphitrite	East Indiaman		Bombay	India	For British East India Company.
Unknown date	Astrée	Privateer		Nantes	Kingdom of France	For Guilliaume et fils.
Unknown date	Bencoolen	East Indiaman		Bombay	India	For British East India Company.
Unknown date	Britannia	East Indiaman		Bombay	India	For British East India Company.
Unknown date	Bunker Hill	Privateer		Massachusetts	United States	For Bartholomew Putnam & Jacob Ashton.
Unknown date	Busy	Cutter		Folkestone	Great Britain	For Royal Navy.
Unknown date	Burc-i Zafer	Fourth rate	Kalas		Ottoman Empire	For Ottoman Navy.
Unknown date	Ejder Başlı	Fourth rate	Kalas		Ottoman Empire	For Ottoman Navy.
Unknown date	General Barker	East Indiaman	Henry Adams	Bucklers Hard	Great Britain	For British East India Company.
Unknown date	Halsewell	East Indiaman	Wells		Great Britain	For British East India Company.
Unknown date	Hydra	Sixth rate	Adams & Barnard	Deptford Dockyard	Great Britain	For Royal Navy.
Unknown date	Incendiary	Fireship	Peter Everett Mestaer	Rotherhithe	Great Britain	For Royal Navy.
Unknown date	Infernal	Fireship	John Perry	Blackwall Yard	Great Britain	For Royal Navy.
Unknown date	La Comtesse de Provence	Privateer	Jacques Denys	Dunkirk	Kingdom of France	For private owner.
Unknown date	La Princesa	Corvette or frigate		San Blas	Viceroyalty of New Spain	For Spanish Navy.
Unknown date	La Princesse de Robecq	Frigate		Boulogne	Kingdom of France	For private owner.
Unknown date	Valeur	Corvette	François-Guillaume Clairain des Lauriers	Saint-Malo	Kingdom of France	For French Navy.
Unknown date	Lawriston	Corvette		Rangoon	Konbaung dynasty	For French East India Company.
Unknown date	Le Duc de Mortemart	Privateer		Saint-Malo	Kingdom of France	For Claude Dubois Le Jaune.
Unknown date	Le Monsieur	Privateer		Havre de Grâce	Kingdom of France	For private owners.
Unknown date	Lucifer	Fireship	John Randall	Rotherhithe	Great Britain	For Royal Navy.
Unknown date	Melikü'l Bahr	Third rate		Constantinople	Ottoman Empire	For Ottoman Navy.
Unknown date	Mermaid	Pilot boat		Bombay	India	For British East India Company.
Unknown date	Nasır-ı Bahri	Fourth rate		Constantinople	Ottoman Empire	For Ottoman Navy.
Unknown date	Nettuno	Xebec			Republic of Venice	For Venetian Navy.
Unknown date	Panther	Sloop-of-war		Bombay	India	For Royal Navy.
Unknown date	Parel	East Indiaman		Amsterdam	Dutch Republic	For Dutch East India Company.
Unknown date	Patna	Sloop		Java	Dutch East Indies	For Bombay Pilot Service.
Unknown date	Princess Royal	Sloop			Great Britain	For private owner.
Unknown date	Raad-ı Bahri	Sixth rate		Constantinople	Ottoman Empire	For Ottoman Navy.
Unknown date	Seahorse	Pilot boat		Bombay	India	For British East India Company.
Unknown date	Shaftesbury	Cutter	Nicholas Bools	Bridport	Great Britain	For Carter Bros.
Unknown date	Temível Portuguesa	Fifth rate		Daman	(Portugal) Portuguese India	For Portuguese Navy.
Unknown date	Name unknown	Merchantman			United States	For private owner.
Unknown date	Name unknown	Brigantine			Kingdom of France	For private owner.
Unknown date	Name unknown	Merchantman			Kingdom of France	For private owner.
