= Chesterfield (1791 ship) =

British whaler and merchantman 1791–1805

History

Great Britain
- Name: Chesterfield
- Namesake: Chesterfield
- Builder: America
- Launched: 1781
- Captured: 1805

General characteristics
- Tons burthen: 180, or 187 (bm)
- Complement: 1799:15; 1803:20
- Armament: 1799:10 × 6-pounder guns + 2 swivel guns; 1803:10 × 6-pounder guns; 1805:12 × 6-pounder guns + 2 × 9-pounder carronades

Chesterfield was built in America in 1781, but it is not clear where and under what name. She arrived in England in 1791. Between 1792 and 1798 Chesterfield made three voyages to the southern whale fishery. On the first of these her crew was involved in a sanguinary encounter with the local inhabitants of an island in Torres Strait. Also in 1793, on the first voyage, her captain named the Chesterfield Islands after his vessel, or her namesake. After her whaling voyages new owners sailed her to trade with the Mediterranean. A Spanish privateer captured her in 1805.

== Career ==
Chesterfield, of 180 tons (bm), first appeared in Lloyd's Register in 1791 with P. Oke, master, Thomas York, owner, and trade Halifax, Nova Scotia–Portsmouth. This data continued unchanged into the 1795 volume. However, from 1793 Lloyd's Register also showed Chesterfield, of 180 tons burthen, built in America. Her master was M.B.Alt, her owner, Duncan, and her trade London–Southern Fishery. She had in 1791 undergone coppering and a good repair.

1st whaling voyage (1792–1794): Captain Matthew Bowles Alt sailed from England on 21 July 1792. In October Chesterfield was at the Kerguelen Islands.

Chesterfield arrived at Port Jackson on 18 November 1792 from the Cape of Good Hope to refit. She sailed on 19 April 1793 for Bengal.

In April 1793 Lieutenant Governor Francis Grose chartered Chesterfield for £120 to take provisions and personnel to Norfolk Island.

Chesterfield sailed in company with Indiaman Shah Hormuzier, William Bampton, master.

Between June and mid-July, the two vessels sailed in the Torres Strait for some months, looking for a way to the East Indies. During this period, Captain Alt named a group of islands the Chesterfield Islands.

At some point, the two vessels anchored off Darnley Island (then known as Tate Island) in the Torres Strait. The islanders attacked a party of seven men in two boats from the ships, killing four men, including Captain Hill, of the New South Wales Corps, and three lascars, when the sailors were discovered polluting Darnley Island's only supply of fresh water. Alt and Bampton, finding some remains and believing all their men dead, ordered the destruction of huts, canoes, and gardens on Darnley Island; the reprisals also resulted in the deaths of several islanders. Captains Alt and Bampton next travelled to Stephens Island in search of a boat that had gone missing during the attack. The islanders shot arrows at the sailors when they landed on the island; the sailors fired on the islanders and set fire to a village on Stephen Island. The missing boat, containing the three survivors from the original party having drifted away from the ships, Mr. Shaw, Chesterfield's mate, sailed it towards Timor. After 14 days, the boat and its three men arrived at the island of Sarrett. There they were met with hospitality. On 10 April 1794 they were able to take a boat to Banda, and on 10 October they were able to sail to Batavia.

Lloyd's List reported on 28 February 1794 that Chesterfield, Alt, master, had arrived on 10 December 1793 at the Cape from Botany Bay. She sailed on 15 December for Thompson Island to complete her cargo. Captain Alt returned to England on 29 October 1794 with 54 tuns whale oil, 40 Cwt bone, and 300 seal skins.

Lloyd's Register for 1796 showed Chesterfield's master changing from M.B. Alt to J. Nichols, and her owner from Duncan to J.Jarrett.

2nd whaling voyage (1796–1797): Although Captain William McClane was listed as Chesterfield's master prior to her sailing, Captain J. Nicols sailed from England on 3 June 1796. In 1797 Chesterfield, Nicols, master, was at Delgoa Bay, having come from the South Seas. She was there at the same time as Fonthill, and so probably there when Hope captured Haasje. Chesterfield and Nichols were back at London on 28 November 1797.

3rd whaling voyage (1797–1798): Captain Nicols sailed from England in 1797. He and Chesterfield returned on 24 June 1798.

Lloyd's Register for 1799 showed Chesterfield's master changing from J. Nichol to N.Brooks, her owner from Jarret Jr to Williams, and her trade from London–South Seas to London–Cape of Good Hope. Captain Nicholas Brooks acquired a letter of marque on 31 March 1799. He sailed from Gravesend on 13 June, bound for the Cape. She sailed via Madeira and in March 1800 was reported to have reached the Cape.

Captain Thomas Brame acquired a letter of marque on 25 July 1803.

Year	Master	Owner	Trade	Source
1804	J. Bream	Williams	London–Mediterranean	LR
1805	J. Bream	Williams	London–Mediterranean	LR;good repair 1791 & damages repaired in 1802

== Fate ==
On 4 March 1805 Carpenter observed Chesterfield west of Gibraltar, heading east, and passed close by. From the number of men on Chesterfield's deck and her lack of response to Carpenter's signals, Captain Meyer, of Carpenter, surmised that Chesterfield had been captured. The Spanish privateer Fuerte, of Cádiz, brought Chesterfield and Hannah, Horn, master, into Málaga in Spain on 6 March. (Note: Hannah, of 140 tons burthen, had been launched in 1793 at Whitby. Her entry too is annotated "captured".)

Lloyd's Register for 1806 had the annotation "captured" beneath her name.
