= French ship Argonaute =

A large number of ships of the French Navy have borne the name Argonaute in honour of the mythological navigators argonauts. Among them:

- Argonaute (1708), a 50-gun ship of the line, personal ship of Emmanuel-Auguste de Cahideuc, Comte Dubois de la Motte
- Argonaute (1723), a 46-gun ship of the line, lead ship of her class
- Argonaute (1781), a 74-gun ship of the line, razéed to a 42-gun ship in 1794 and renamed Flibustier, out of service in 1795
- Argonaute (1798), a 74-gun ship of the line that took part in the Battle of Trafalgar
- Argonaute (1806), formerly the Spanish Vencedor of 78 guns
- Argonaute (1840), a ship of the line launched in 1840 but never commissioned
- Argonaute (1893), a torpedo boat
- Argonaute (1905), a prototype submarine
- Argonaute (NN6), a submarine, lead ship of her class, sunk by HMS Achates and/or HMS Westcott on 8 November 1942
- Argonaute (S636), a submarine of the Aréthuse type (1958), now a museum
- Argonaute (2004), a ship specialised in rescue and decontamination

== Sources and references ==
- Les bâtiments ayant porté le nom d'Argonaute, netmarine.net
