= HMS Espion =

Three ships of the Royal Navy have been named HMS Espion, meaning "spy". A fourth vessel was going to bear the name but was given another name instead:

- HMS Espion was a 16-gun French Levrette-class cutter launched in 1781, captured in 1782 and sold in 1784.
- HMS Espion was the 16-gun French privateer corvette Robert launched in 1793 at Nantes. The British captured her in 1793 and named her HMS Espion. The French recaptured her in 1794 and took her into service as Espion. The British recaptured her in 1795, but there being another Espion in service by then, the British renamed their capture HMS Spy. She served under that name until the Navy sold her in 1801. Spy then became a slave ship, a merchantman to South America, and privateer again. The French captured her in mid-1805 and sent her into Guadeloupe.
- HMS Espion was the French frigate Atalante, which the British captured in 1794 and later converted to a store or troopship. She was wrecked, with no loss of life, in 1799.
- Espion was the name initially chosen for Little Belt.
