= Haasje (ship) =

Several ships have been named Haasje after the Dutch word for hare:

- Haasje was a Dutch naval brig that the Royal Navy captured in 1803 and took into service in 1804 as the fireship HMS Phosphorus. She took part in a notable single-ship action in 1806. The Navy sold her in 1810. She then became a merchantman trading with the Mediterranean. She was lost c.1813.
- Haasje (1788 ship) (or Haas) was built at Amsterdam as a packet for the Dutch East India Company (VOC). She made three or probably four voyages between Texel and Batavia. A British whaler captured her in August 1797 as Haasje was on a secret mission from Batavia to arm Dutch farmers in the Cape Colony to stir up difficulties for the British. She sailed to Britain and a French privateer captured her shortly before she arrived. She was quickly recaptured. She became a merchantman sailing between London and Dartmouth, and then London and Africa. She was last listed in 1806.
