= Joseph Léon de La Marthonie =

French Navy officer

- Born: 27 March 1727; Saint-Germain-du-Seudre
- Died: 6 August 1789 (aged 62) Saintes, Charente-Maritime
- Branch: French Navy
- Rank: brigadier des armées navales
- Conflicts: Battle of Martinique

Joseph Léon de La Marthonie (Saint-Germain-du-Seudre, 27 March 1727 — Saintes, Charente-Maritime, 6 August 1789) was a French Navy officer. He served during the War of American Independence.

== Biography ==
La Marthonie was born to the family of Suzanne Galateau and Léon Raymond de La Marthonie de Gaignon. La Marthonie joined the Navy as a Garde-Marine on 28 November 1743.

In 1767, La Marthonie captained the 4-gun corvette Lunette.

In 1770, La Marthonie captained 64-gun Bizarre, at Rochefort.

On 4 May 1779, La Marthonie was promoted to Brigadier des Armées navales. He was given command of the 64-gun Jason, based at Toulon. The year after, he took command of the 74-gun Pluton. He captained her at the Battle of Martinique on 17 April 1780.

== Sources and references ==
Notes

Citations

References

- Troude, Onésime-Joachim (1867). Batailles navales de la France (in French). Vol. 2. Challamel ainé.
