= William and Ann =

Several sailing ships have been named William and Ann:

- William and Ann, a 20-gun hired vessel of the Royal Navy mentioned in 1757.
- William and Ann (1759) was a former vessel of the British Royal Navy that first appeared under that name in 1786. She was a 370-ton merchantman, convict transport, and whaler. She was last listed in 1857.
- William and Ann, an armed ship mentioned in 1759.
- William and Ann, a brig that HMS Amazon recaptured in 1777.
- William and Ann (1781 ship) was launched in 1781 at Whitby. From her launch until 1805 she alternated between being a transport and trading with the Baltic. In 1805 she became a whaler in the British northern whale fishery. She wrecked in ice in 1830 in the Greenland Fisheries on her 24th whaling voyage.
- William and Ann, a gun boat mentioned in 1795.
- William and Ann, a 77-ton sloop mentioned in 1814.
- William and Ann (1818 Bermuda ship) was launched in Bermuda. In 1824 the Hudson's Bay Company purchased William and Ann. She made three voyages to Fort George on the Columbia River, and was lost on 10 March 1829 on her fourth as she was arriving there.
- William and Ann, a 38-ton merchant ship mentioned in 1875.
