= Ça Ira (disambiguation) =

Ça Ira is a French song. The name may also refer to:

- Ça Ira (opera)
- French ship Ça Ira (several ships)
- Ca Ira, Virginia
- Ça Ira!, Dadaistic monthly magazine, Antwerp, 1920-1923
