= HMS Pelican (1777) =

- Pelican

History

Great Britain
- Name: HMS Pelican
- Ordered: 24 July 1776
- Awarded: 6 August 1776
- Builder: Adams & Barnard, Grove Street Shipyard, Deptford
- Laid down: August 1776
- Launched: 24 April 1777
- Commissioned: May 1777
- Fate: Wrecked off Jamaica in August 1781

General characteristics
- Class & type: 24-gun Porcupine-class sixth-rate post ship
- Tons burthen: 520 (bm)
- Length: 114 ft 5 in (34.87 m) (overall); 94 ft 6 in (28.80 m) (keel)
- Beam: 32 ft 2 in (9.80 m)
- Draught: 7 ft 9 in (2.36 m); 11 ft (3.4 m)
- Depth of hold: 10 ft 3 1/2 in (3.137 m)
- Sail plan: Full-rigged ship
- Complement: 160
- Armament: As built: Upper deck: 22 × 9-pounder guns; Quarterdeck: 2 × 6-pounder guns

HMS Pelican was a 24-gun Porcupine-class sixth-rate post ship of the Royal Navy built in 1777 and wrecked in 1781.

== Construction and commissioning ==
Pelican cost £5,623.11.0d to build, plus £3,545.0.7d for fitting . She was commissioned under her first commanding officer, Captain Henry Lloyd, in May 1777.

== Service ==
Pelican was first stationed under Lloyd in the North Sea; by 1778 she was stationed off Cape Finisterre and a year later she had transferred to the coast of Portugal. She returned to England for a refit at Sheerness Dockyard between August and September 1779 and was recommissioned in November with Captain William Lockhart in command. Lockhart only stayed with Pelican briefly and by January 1780 Captain Thomas Haynes had assumed command of the post ship. Under him she sailed for the Jamaica Station on 13 April, where she captured the French privateer La Marquise de Saint-Pern on 9 December. In June 1781 Captain Cuthbert Collingwood took command from Haynes. Pelican captured the French 16-gun ship Le Cerf on 22 July.

== Fate ==
On 2 August Pelican, while under the command of Cuthbert Collingwood was caught up in a hurricane and wrecked on the Morant Keys. The crew were shipwrecked but managed to get ashore in rafts where they remained for ten days until rescued. The subsequent court-martial, mandatory for any Captain who loses his ship declared Collingwood and his crew not at fault for the loss of the ship, given the tremendous extent of the hurricane that had caused much damage across the region.
