= Razee =

Ship type

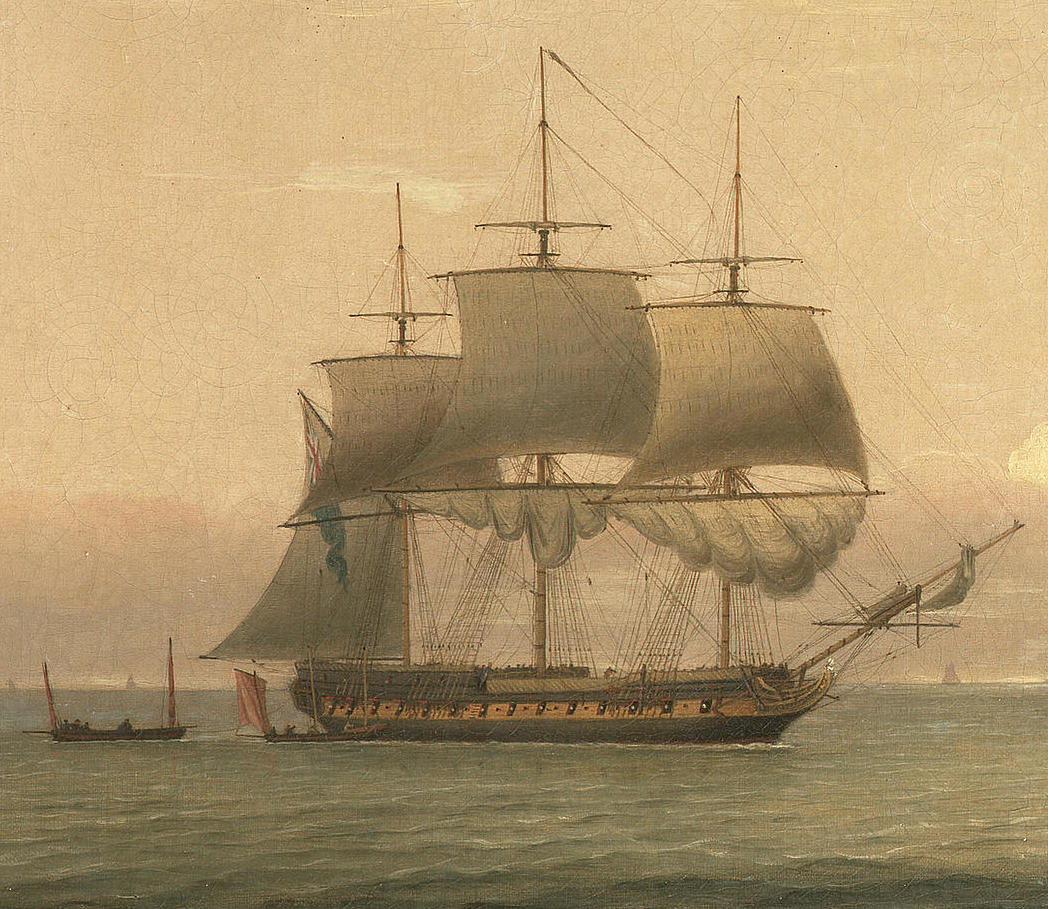
1807 painting of HMS Anson as a razee

A razee or razée /rəˈziː/ is a sailing ship that has been cut down (razeed) to reduce the number of decks. The word is derived from the French vaisseau rasé, meaning a razed (in the sense of shaved down) ship.

== Seventeenth century ==
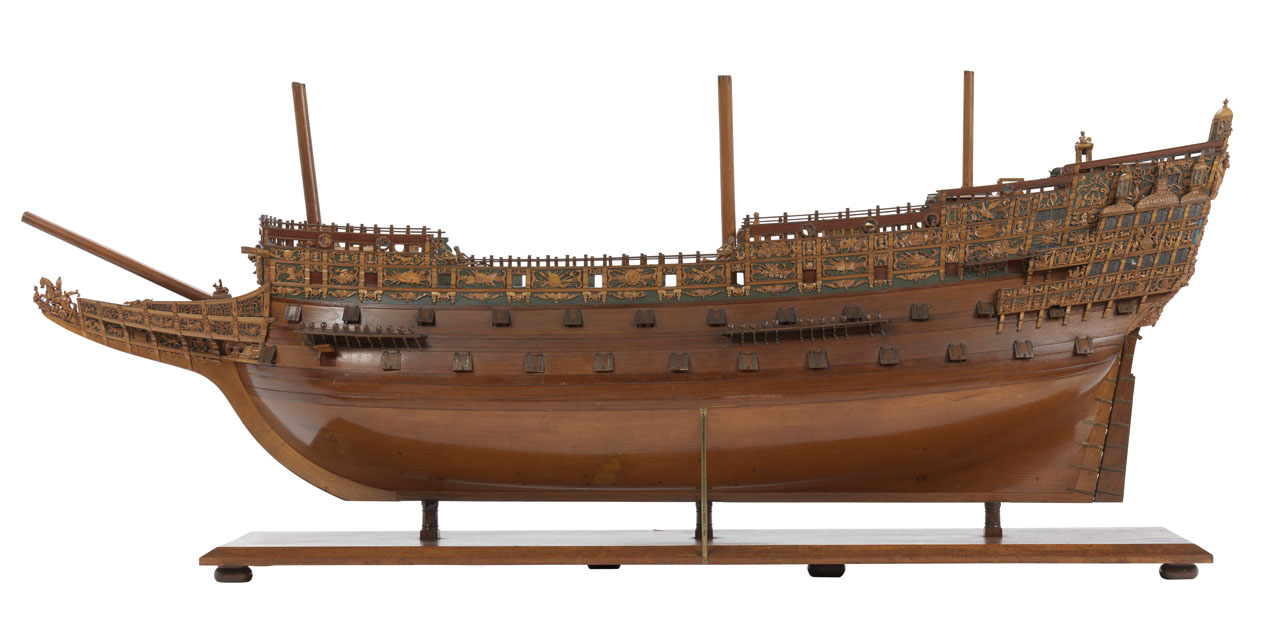
Ship model of Sovereign of the Seas

During the transition from galleons to more frigate-like warships (1600 – 1650) there was a general awareness that the reduction in topweight afforded by the removal of upperworks made ships better sailers; Rear Admiral Sir William Symonds noted after the launch of Sovereign of the Seas that she was "cut down" and made a safe and fast ship. In 1651 Sovereign of the Seas was again made more manoeuvrable by reducing the number of cannon. Ships were razeed not only by navies but also by pirates – Captain Charles Johnson's A General History of the Pyrates describes George Lowther refitting Gambia Castle in 1721:

They one and all came into measures, knocked down the cabins, made the ship flush fore and aft, prepared black colours, new named her the Delivery, having about 50 hands and 16 guns.

This did not reduce the number of gun decks, but had the effect of making the razee ship much handier, since the forecastle and aftcastle no longer created windage, top weight was reduced, and the ship was made lighter overall.

== Eighteenth and early nineteenth centuries ==
=== Royal Navy ===
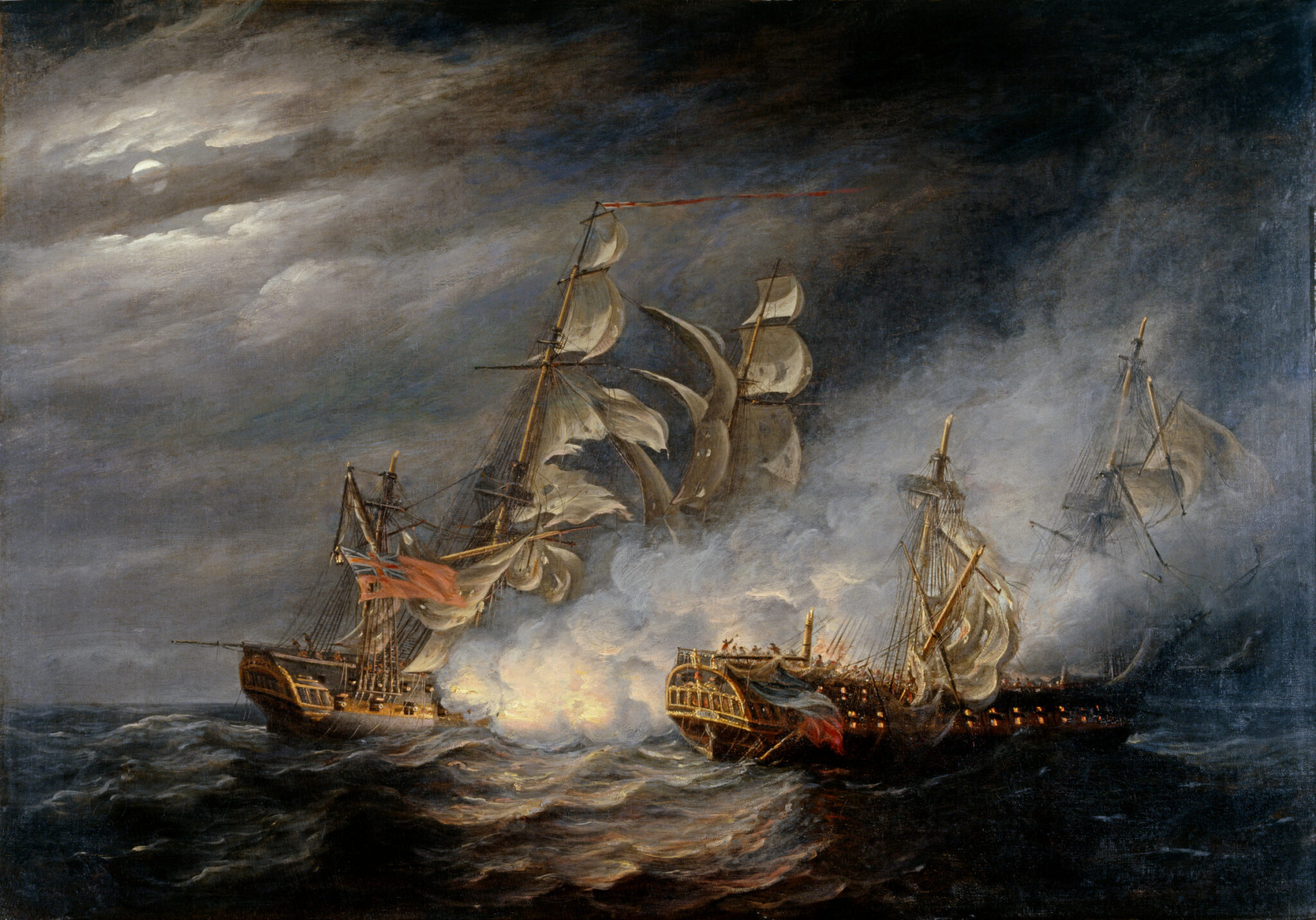
The razee HMS Indefatigable (left) fighting Virginie on 21 April 1796

In the Royal Navy, the razee operation was typically performed on a smaller two-deck ship of the line, resulting in a large frigate. The rationale for this apparent reduction in gun power was that the smaller ships-of-the-line could no longer be used safely in fleet actions as the overall size and armament of opposing ships increased. The resulting razeed ship was classed as a frigate; it was stronger than the usual run of purpose-built frigates.

In similar fashion, three-decked ships of the line were sometimes razeed, either to become flush-decked (with the quarterdeck and forecastle removed) or cut down to become two-deckers.

HMS Namur (1756) was a 90-gun second rate launched in 1756. She was razeed as a 74-gun third rate in 1805.

Three 64-gun ships were cut down (razeed) in 1794 into 44-gun frigates. The most successful was HMS Indefatigable which was commanded by Sir Edward Pellew.

- HMS Magnanime of 1780
- HMS Anson of 1781
- HMS Indefatigable of 1784

Towards the close of the Napoleonic Wars, three elderly 74-gun ships were razeed into 58-gun fourth rates (not losing a complete deck, so remaining a two-decker, but having the quarterdeck removed). Two more followed immediately post-war, although the second never completed conversion.

- HMS Goliath of 1781 (razeed 1813)
- HMS Majestic of 1785 (razeed 1813)
- HMS Saturn of 1786 (razeed 1813)
- HMS Elephant of 1786 (razeed 1817-18)
- HMS Excellent of 1787 (began razee 1825)

Another eleven more-recent 74s were razeed in 1826-1845, in this case being fully reduced to 50-gun heavy frigates; three others were scheduled for similar conversion, but this was never completed.

- HMS Barham of 1811 (razeed 1826)
- HMS Dublin of 1812 (razeed 1826)
- HMS Asia of 1811 (renamed HMS Alfred 1819 and razeed 1826-28)
- HMS Cornwall of 1812 (razeed 1827-30)
- HMS America of 1810 (razeed 1827-28)
- HMS Conquestador of 1810 (razeed 1827-31)
- HMS Rodney of 1809 (renamed HMS Greenwich 1826 and began razee conversion 1827, but never completed it)
- HMS Clarence of 1812 (renamed HMS Centurion 1826 and began razee conversion 1827, but never completed it)
- HMS Cressy of 1810 (began razee conversion 1827, but never completed it)
- HMS Vindictive of 1813 (razeed 1828-32)
- HMS Eagle of 1804 (razeed 1830-31)
- HMS Gloucester of 1812 (razeed 1831)
- HMS Warspite of 1807 (razeed 1837-40)
- HMS Tremendous of 1784 (renamed HMS Grampus 1845 on completing razee conversion)

=== French razée warships (Revolutionary War conversions) ===
In the French navy, a number of 74-gun two-deckers were similarly razeed into 54-gun ships:

- Diadème (renamed Brutus in September 1792 and razeed between December 1793 and May 1794)
- Hercule of 1778 (razeed between February and June 1794, then renamed Hydre in May 1795)
- Argonaute of 1781 (razeed between December 1793 and March 1794, then renamed Flibustier in June 1794)
- Illustre of 1781 (razeed between August 1793 and February 1794, renamed Mucius Scevola in January 1794, name shortened to Scevola in February 1794)
- Brave of 1781 (razeed between April 1793 and January 1794, without change of name)
- Borée of 1785 (renamed Ça Ira in April 1794, then again Agricola in June 1794 and razeed between April and July 1794)
- Agamemnon of 1812

=== United States razee warship ===
- USS Independence of 1814

== Late nineteenth century ==
USS Cumberland

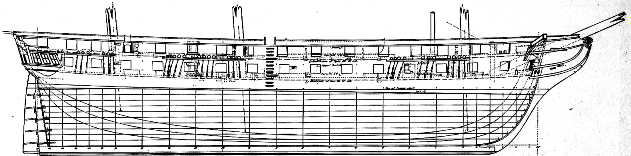
Before conversion as a frigate...

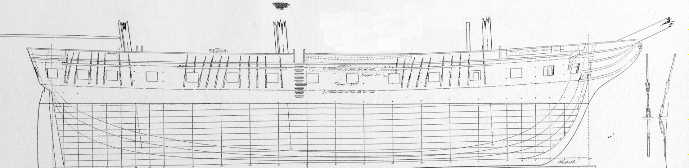
...and after razeed to a sloop of war.

In the United States Navy, several of the final generation of sailing frigates launched in the 1840s were cut down to become large sloops-of-war. Advances in metallurgy and artillery in the 1850s allowed the casting of guns that fired substantially heavier shot than had previously been in use, as well as exploding shells. Thus, when the decision was made to rearm these frigates with heavier but fewer guns, the reduction in crew size allowed the ships to be razeed. Their sail plan and size made them superb sailers. Although these ships carried a heavier broadside as 20 gun sloops-of-war than they did as 40 gun frigates, they were rerated as nominally smaller sloops-of-war because they mounted fewer guns. Such ships include USS Macedonian and USS Cumberland.
