= French ship Ça Ira =

Four ships of the French Navy have borne the name Ça Ira ("It will be fine") in honour of the revolutionary anthem Ça Ira.

== French ships named Ça Ira ==
- Couronne (1781), an 80-gun ship of the line, was renamed Ça Ira in 1792
- A gunship (1794)
- Borée (1785), a Téméraire-class ship of the line, was renamed Ça Ira in 1794
- A gunship (1795-1796)
Ships of the French Navy named Ça Ira
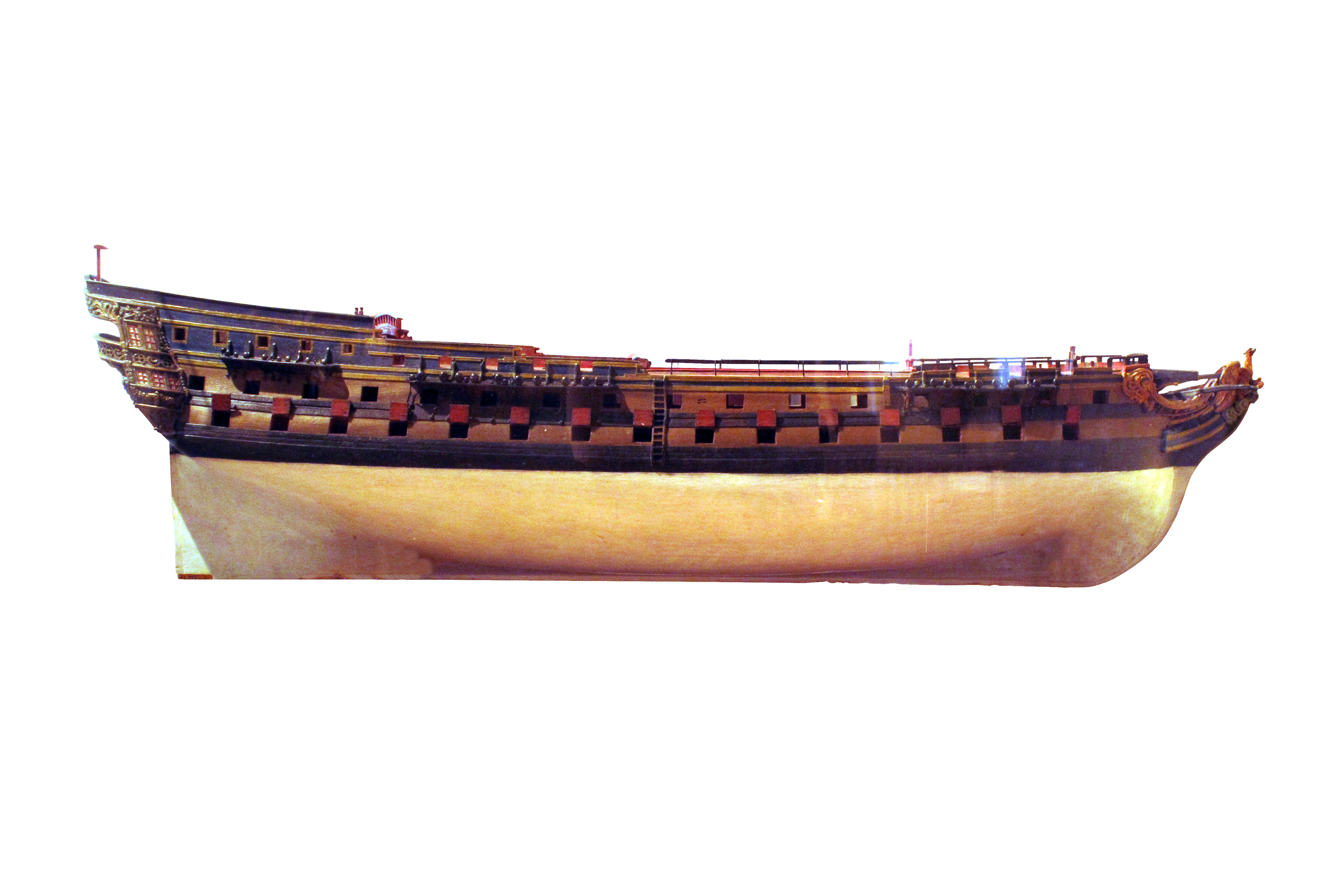
Couronne (1781)

== Bibliography ==
- Roche, Jean-Michel (2005). Dictionnaire des bâtiments de la flotte de guerre française de Colbert à nos jours. Vol. 1. Group Retozel-Maury Millau. p. 90. ISBN 978-2-9525917-0-6. OCLC 165892922.
