= Caldicot Castle (1794 ship) =

History

Great Britain
- Name: Caldicot Castle
- Namesake: Caldicot Castle
- Owner: 1794:H. Wife; 1796:M'Iver; 1797:Timperon; 1798:Litt & Co.; 1799:Timperon; 1803:Jones & Co.; 1806:Dowson; 1820:Hart; 1823:Laings; 1829:S. Keene; 1830:Isabella Skee
- Launched: 1794, (Note: Lloyd's Register for 1794 gives a launch year of 1792. However, she does not appear in either 1792 or 1793, and subsequent entries say 1794.) Caldicot
- Fate: Wrecked October 1828; last listed in 1832

General characteristics
- Tons burthen: 262, or 266, or 268, or 270, or 292 (bm)
- Propulsion: Sail
- Complement: 1796:30; 1799:30; 1800:25
- Armament: 1796:16 × 6&4-pounder guns; 1799:16 × 6&4-pounder guns; 1800:16 × 6-pounder guns

Caldicot Castle (or Caldecot Castle, or Caldecott Castle) was built in 1794 at Caldicot, Monmouthshire. The French captured her twice; the second time she engaged her captor in a single ship action. She also survived the perils of the sea in 1803, 1807, and 1819. She was wrecked in October 1828, and was last listed in 1832.

== Career ==
Caldicot Castle appears in the 1794 volume of Lloyd's Register with P. Driscoll, master, and trade Bristol—Quebec.

On 18 March 1795, as Caldecot Castle, Driscol, master, was sailing from Barcelona to Guernsey, a French squadron of six ships-of-the-line, two frigates, and a corvette captured her off Cape St. Vincent. However, on 30 March, Robust, of Admiral Colpoy's squadron, recaptured her and took her into Falmouth. Ten British warships, Astraea, London, Colossus, Robust, Hannibal, Valiant, Thalia, Cerberus, and Santa Margarita, shared in the proceeds of Caldicot Castle's recapture on 28 March.

In January 1803, Caldicot Castle was returning to Liverpool from Quebec when she had to put in at Crookhaven. She had lost her mizzen mast and rudder, and sustained other damage.

Lloyd's List reported on 4 May 1804, that privateers had captured Sarah, Cannell, master, Caldicot Castle, Skerrett, master, and Hector, Williams, master, and taken them into Guadeloupe. (Note: Sarah and Hector were slave ships. Hector had disembarked her captives and was returning to Liverpool when she was captured. Sarah was captured on her way from Africa to Demerara.) Captain Richard Sherrat wrote a letter from Barbados on 14 April, in which he described the attack. He had sailed Caldicot Castle from Demerara on 27 February, and by 8 March was about 200 miles east of Guadeloupe when at 8 pm two privateers, a schooner and a ship, came up and opened fire. After about 15 minutes, the schooner had sustained damages and had sheered off. By 9:20 the ship also sheared off but remained in sight. Next morning at 6am the ship recommenced the engagement. After about 15 minutes Sherrat had to strike. Caldicot Castle's rigging had been cut to pieces and he and two other men had been wounded, one mortally. The privateer was Grand Decide, which was armed with twenty 9-pounder and two 12-pounder brass guns, and had a crew of 160 men. (Note: Grand Décidé was a privateer under Mathieu Goy, commissioned in Guadeloupe in January 1804. She had a crew of 220 men and was armed with twenty-two 8-pounder guns.)

Year	Master	Owner	Trade	Notes
1796	Thompson	M'Iver	Bristol—London; London—Jamaica	10 × 4-pounder guns
1797	Thompson; Oxton	M'Iver; Timperon	London—Jamaica	Captain Thomas Oxton acquired a letter of marque on 24 April 1797
1798	Oxton	Litt & Co.	Liverpool—Jamaica	8 × 6-pounder guns + 8 × 4-pounder guns
1799	T. Oxton; John Williams	Timperon	Liverpool—Jamaica	Captain John Williams acquired a letter of marque on 25 February 1799
1800	Williams	Timperon	Liverpool—Jamaica	
1801	Williams; Smith	Timperon	Liverpool—Jamaica	Captain William Smith acquired a letter of marque on 18 October 1800
1802	W. Smith	Timperon	Liverpool—Jamaica	
1803	W. Smith; Sherret	Timperon; Jones & Co.	Liverpool—Jamaica	
1804	R. Skerrett	Jones & Co.	Liverpool—Barbados	

Caldicott Castle returned to British hands, though how is not clear. Her entry in Lloyd's Register for 1805 is marked "captured", but also shows a change of master.

Year	Master	Owner	Trade	Notes
1805	R. Sherrad; D. M'Neil	Jones & Co.	Liverpool—Barbados	Six guns
1806	A. M'Neil	Dowson & Co.	London transport	

On 18 November 1817, Lloyd's List reported that Caldicot Castle had arrived at Portsmouth, having sailed from Malta via Gibraltar in company with several other transports until heavy weather had separated them.

Year	Master	Owner	Trade	Notes
1816	Carr	Dowson	London transport	
1817				Lloyd's Register unavailable/not published
1818	Carr	Dowson & Co.	London transport	
1819	Carr; J. Hait	Dowson & Co.	London transport Hull—"Klnda"	

On 4 December 1819, Caldicott Castle ran aground and was severely damaged at Sunderland, County Durham.

Year	Master	Owner	Trade	Notes
1820	J. Hart	Capt. & Co.	Hull-"Kanda"	Large repair 1820
1821	J. Hart	Capt. & Co.	Hull-"Kinda"	
1822	J. Hart; Charlton	Captain & Co.	Hull—"Kinda"; Plymouth-Quebec	
1823	Charlton	Laings	Plymouth-Quebec	
1824	Charlton	Laings	Plymouth-Quebec	
1825	Charlton	Laings	Plymouth-Quebec	
1826	Charlton	Laings	Plymouth-Quebec	
1827	Charlton	Laings	Plymouth-Quebec	
1828	Charlton	Laings	Plymouth-Quebec	
1829	Hicks	S. Keene	Dublin—Dantzig	
1830	Hicks	S. Keene	Dublin—Dantzig	

== Fate ==
It was reported on 20 October 1828, that Caldicot Castle had struck a rock and sunk at Milford but by 15 October, had been raised and pulled up on Laurenny Beach. Caldicot Castle was last listed in 1832.
