= French ship Hercule (1778) =

Ship of the line of the French Navy

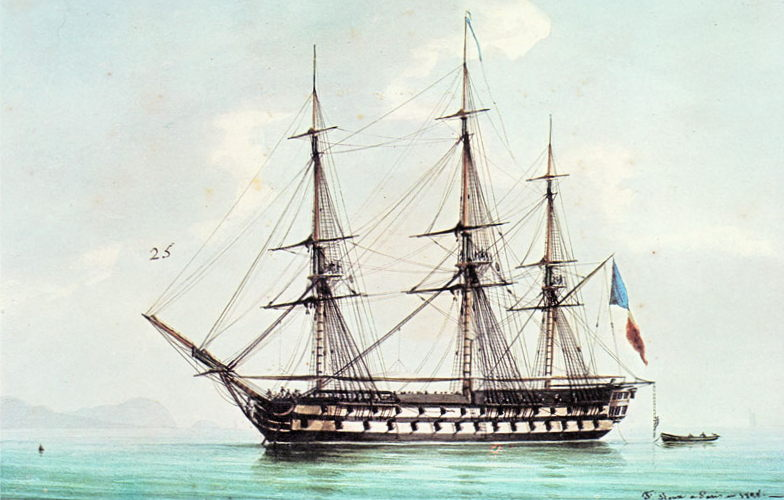
- Pluton, Hercule's sister ship

History

France
- Name: Hercule
- Launched: 5 October 1778
- Honours and awards: Participated in: Battle of the Chesapeake; Battle of the Saintes
- Fate: Broken up 1799

General characteristics
- Class & type: Scipion class
- Displacement: 2,943 tonneaux
- Tons burthen: 1,424 port tonneaux
- Length: 53.8 m (176 ft 6 in)
- Beam: 14.1 m (46 ft 3 in)
- Draught: 7.3 m (24 ft)
- Propulsion: Sails
- Armament: 74 to 78 guns of various weights of shot

Hercule was a 74-gun Scipion-class ship of the line of the French Navy built at Rochefort. In 1781, under Captain Jean-Baptiste Turpin du Breuil, Hercule was in the Blue squadron of the fleet under François Joseph Paul de Grasse. She took part in the Battle of the Chesapeake on 5 September 1781, and in the subsequent siege of Yorktown. Hercule was commanded by Captain Jean Isaac Chadeau de la Clocheterie in the Battle of the Saintes. Hercule was razeed in 1794. In May 1795, she was renamed Hydre, and was eventually broken up in 1799.
