= Sarah (1797 ship) =

British slave ship

History

Great Britain
- Name: Sarah
- Builder: Liverpool
- Launched: 1797
- Fate: Captured 1804

General characteristics
- Tons burthen: 386 (bm)
- Propulsion: Sail
- Complement: 1797:30; 1799:40; 1803:50
- Armament: 1797:20 × 9-pounder + 4 × 12-pounder guns; 1799:20 × 9-pounder + 4 × 12-pounder guns; 1803:2 × 12-pounder + 18 × 9-pounder guns

Sarah was launched at Liverpool in 1797. She then made six voyages as a Liverpool-based slave ship in the triangular trade carrying enslaved people from West Africa to the West Indies. A French privateer captured Sarah in 1804 in a single-ship action on her seventh voyage after Sarah had gathered her slaves but before she could deliver them to the West Indies.

== Career ==
Sarah entered Lloyd's Register in 1797 with T. Reeves, master, Dickson, owner, and trade Liverpool–Africa.

The Slave Trade Act 1788 (Dolben's Act) was the first British legislation passed to regulate the shipping of enslaved people. The Act limited the number of enslaved people that British slave ships could transport without penalty, the cap being based on the ships' tons burthen. At a burthen of 386 tons, the limit for Sarah was 524 captives.

1st enslaving voyage (1797–1798): Captain Thomas Rives acquired a letter of marque on 17 July 1797. Captain Rives sailed from Liverpool on 9 August and started gathering slaves at Bonny on 4 October. Sarah sailed from Africa 21 November, and arrived at Montego Bay on 22 January 1798. She had embarked 520 captives and she landed 510, for a mortality rate of 2%. She left Jamaica on 6 March and arrived back at Liverpool on 24 April. She had left with 55 crewmen, three of whom died on the voyage.

One of the provisions of Dolben's Act was bonuses for the master (£100) and surgeon (£50) if the mortality among the captives was under 2%; a mortality rate of under 3% resulted in a bonus of half that. (Note: At the time the monthly wage for a captain of an enslaving ship out of Bristol was £5 per month. That said, masters and surgeons received most of their income in the form of "coast commissions", based on the total number of captives they delivered, plus the income of the sale of two (or more) privilege captives.) Dolben's Act apparently resulted in some reduction in the numbers of captives carried per vessel, and possibly in mortality, though the evidence is ambiguous.

2nd enslaving voyage (1798–1799): Captain Rives sailed from Liverpool on 8 September 1799. Sarah arrived at Falmouth, Jamaica, on 26 February 1799, where she landed 511 captives. She left on 1 May, and arrived back at Liverpool on 29 July. She had left with 62 crew men and she suffered five crew deaths on the voyage.

Captain John Bralsford acquired a letter of marque on 20 September 1799. New regulations in 1799 on the slave trade further reduced the number of captives a vessel was allowed to carry, this time based on square footage below decks allocated to each captive.

3rd enslaving voyage (1799–1800): Captain John Brelsford (or Brailsford) sailed from Liverpool on 11 October 1799. Sarah acquired captives at Bonny and arrived at Kingston, Jamaica, on 21 March 1800 with 315 captives. She sailed from Kingston on 25 April and arrived back at Liverpool 25 June. She had left Liverpool with 55 crew members and she suffered eight crew deaths on the voyage.

4th enslaving voyage (1800–1801): Captain Brelsford sailed from Liverpool on 19 October 1800. Sarah acquired captives at Bonny and arrived at Kingston on 6 March 1801, where she landed 317 captives . She sailed from Kingston on 1 April and arrived at Liverpool on 7 June,. She had left with 55 crew members but had only 40 at Kingston, presumably having lost some to desertion at Bonny as she had only four crew deaths on the voyage.

5th enslaving voyage (1801–1802): Captain Brelsford sailed from Liverpool on 3 August 1801. Sarah acquired captives at Bonny and arrived at Kingston on 4 January 1802. There she landed 330 captives. She sailed from Kingston on 7 February and arrived back at Liverpool on 10 April. She had left Liverpool with 47 crew members and she suffered four crew deaths on the voyage.

6th enslaving voyage (1802–1803): Captain Thomas Cannell sailed from Liverpool on 21 August 1802. (Note: Captain Thomas Cannell was the leading (in terms of the number of enslaving voyages), captain in the 1785–1807 period. He made 17 voyages in eight vessels for seven owners. Before becoming a captain in enslaving ships in the 1780s, he sailed between the Dutch and British Leeward Islands.) Sarah acquired captives at Bonny and arrived at Kingston on 1 February 1803, where she landed 327 captives. She arrived back at Liverpool on 18 June. She had left Liverpool with 47 crew members and she had suffered four crew deaths on the voyage.

Captain Thomas Cannell acquired a letter of marque on 2 August 1803. He left Liverpool on 13 September with 55 crew members on Sarah's 7th enslaving voyage. She was one of 99 British vessels that left British ports that year, bound on enslaving voyages; 83 of the vessels came from Liverpool.

== Fate ==
Lloyd's Register for 1805 showed Sarah with T. Connell, master, changing to J. Salisbury, Penny & Co., owner, and trade Liverpool–Africa, changing to Liverpool–Lisbon. The entry is annotated with the word "captured".

Lloyd's List reported on 4 May 1804 that Sarah, Cannell, master, had been captured and carried into Guadeloupe. She, together with Hector, Williams, master, and Caldicot Castle, Skerrett, master, were reportedly sailing from Demerara to Liverpool.

The French privateer was armed with ten 6-pounder guns and had a crew of 100. When Sarah's captain and first mate were carried below because of their wounds, the crew fled below too. The second mate attempted unsuccessfully to rally them. As Sarah's resistance slackened, the privateer carried her by boarding. British casualties were two killed and 12 wounded. French casualties were three killed and 20 wounded.

In 1805, 30 British slave ships were lost. Reportedly only one was lost on the homeward-bound leg of her voyage. However, absent detailed vessel-by-vessel histories, it is not always clear whether a homeward-bound vessel was a Guineaman or not. War, not maritime hazards nor slave resistance, was the greatest cause of vessel losses among British slave vessels.
