= HMS Hyaena (1778) =

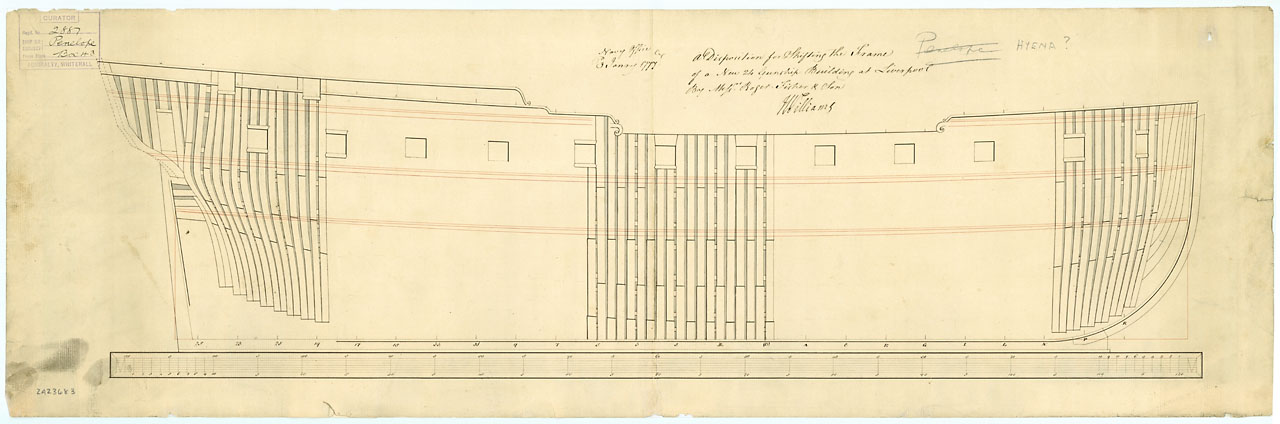
- Hyaena

History

Great Britain
- Name: HMS Hyaena
- Ordered: 9 October 1776
- Builder: John Fisher, Liverpool
- Laid down: May 1777
- Launched: 2 March 1778
- Completed: By January 1779 at Portsmouth
- Commissioned: January 1779
- Captured: 25 May 1793

France
- Name: Hyène
- Owner: 1793-1796: French Navy; 1796-1797:Private owners
- Acquired: 25 May 1793 by capture
- Captured: 25 October 1797

Great Britain
- Name: HMS Hyaena
- Acquired: 25 October 1797 by capture
- Fate: Sold out of service, Deptford 1802

United Kingdom
- Name: Recovery
- Owner: Daniel Bennett
- Acquired: 1802 by purchase
- Fate: Broken up 1813

General characteristics
- Class & type: 24-gun Porcupine-class post ship
- Displacement: 800 tons (French)
- Tons burthen: 52139/94, or 522, or 526 (bm)
- Length: 114 ft 4 in (34.8 m) (gundeck), or 119 ft 9 in (36.5 m)
- Beam: 32 ft 3 in (9.83 m), or 29 ft 5 in (9.0 m)
- Depth of hold: 10 ft 3 1/4 in (3.1 m)
- Propulsion: Sails
- Sail plan: ship-rigged
- Complement: Originally:160; Privateer:230; Royal Navy:160; Whaler:50
- Armament: Originally: Upper deck: 22 × 9-pounder guns; QD: 2 × 6-pounder guns; Privateer: 20 × 9-pounder guns; Royal Navy:20 × 32-pounder carronades; Whaler:6 × 9-pounder + 10 × 6-pounder guns

HMS Hyaena (HMS Hyæna) was a 24-gun Porcupine-class post-ship of the Royal Navy launched in 1778. The French captured her in 1793, took her into service as Hyène, and then sold her. She became a privateer that the British captured in 1797. The Royal Navy took her back into service as Hyaena and she continued to serve until the Navy sold her in 1802. The ship's new owner, Daniel Bennett, renamed her Recovery. Between 1802 and 1813, she made seven voyages as a whaler in the British southern whale fishery. She was broken up later in 1813.

== Early service ==
Launched in March 1778, she was commissioned in January 1779 for service in British home waters and the Caribbean, under the command of Captain Edward Thompson. She saw active service in the blockade and capture of French-controlled Gorée in April 1779, and eight months later was part of Admiral George Rodney's fleet which sailed to the naval relief of Gibraltar in January 1780.

Hyaena then returned to England, bearing reports of the battle and the disposition of Admiral Rodney's fleet. In August 1780, still under Thompson's command, Hyaena escorted a merchant convoy to New York and then turned south to the Caribbean. Thompson's orders were to use his ship and any other forces at his disposal to secure British control of Dutch settlements of Demerara and Essequibo. This was achieved despite a lack of resources, with Hyaena subsequently escorting merchant convoys between these new British possessions and the larger port of Barbados, and thence to England. Convoy in tow, Hyaena reached England in January 1782. Eighteen months in tropical waters had left her in poor condition, and she was promptly decommissioned and sailed to Woolwich dockyards for repair. The works were extensive and were completed at a final expense of £5,561, more than half the cost of Hyaena's original construction four years earlier.

While Hyaena was out of service her captain, Edward Thompson, had been assigned to the newly built HMS Grampus, a 50-gun ship of the line. Command of Hyaena passed to Captain Patrick Sinclair, whose orders were to protect shipping in the seas immediately surrounding the British Isles. Recommissioned in January 1783, Hyaena took up this new role in April and remained at this station for the next five years. In 1784, she was briefly under the command of the Honourable M.De Courcy (Acting), until Sinclair resumed command. In 1787 De Courcy took command of Hyaena on the Irish station. May saw Hyaena serving as the initial escort for the convoy of ships that would become the First Fleet to Australia, sailing alongside the fleet to a point two hundred miles west of the Scilly Isles. While undertaking this escort it was discovered that the convict storeship Fishburn was five crew members short. This was addressed by requiring five of Hyaena's crew to transfer to Fishburn for the eight-month voyage to Australia.

In 1788 Hyaena was again decommissioned to allow a four-month refit at Plymouth Dockyard for a cost of £4,439. After a brief period of service in the Irish Sea under the command of Captain John Aylmer, she returned to the English Channel where she remained throughout 1790 and early 1791. In mid-1791 she was under the command of Captain James Kineer, as the Navy relegated her to the status of an impressment vessel at Bristol, holding press-ganged sailors aboard until they could be transferred to Navy vessels departing for foreign service.

== Capture and recapture ==
Finally, after a further refit, Hyaena returned to overseas service under Captain William Hargood, sailing for Jamaica in October 1791. Disaster struck on 25 May 1793 when Hyaena encountered the brand-new 40-gun French frigate Concorde in open waters off Hispaniola. Outgunned by Concorde and unable to escape, Hyaena had to strike her colours after having fired only a few guns during the three hours that Concorde chased her. She then become a French prize. (Note: There was some subsequent condemnation of Hargood in naval histories in the early 1800s, but it is clear from his acquittal, and that of his officers and men, in the subsequent court martial on 11 October 1793, that Hargood had acted correctly. His subsequent career supports the view that the Navy did not believe that he had failed to do his duty.)

The French removed Hyaena's quarterdeck and forecastle to create a flush-deck, and renamed the modified vessel Hyène. She was sold at Bayonne in December 1796, and her new owners used her as a privateer in pursuit of British and neutral shipping in the Caribbean.

A year later, on 25 October 1797, Hyène encountered HMS Indefatigable, a 44-gun frigate commanded by Sir Edward Pellew, which captured Hyène after a chase of eight hours. At the time Hyène carried twenty-four 9-pounder guns and had a crew of 230 men. She was two weeks out of Bayonne but had not captured anything. Hyène had apparently mistaken Indefatigable for a vessel from Portuguese India. Pellew judged that had Hyène not lost her foretopmast in the chase, she might well have escaped.

== HMS Hyaena again ==
Hyene returned to Plymouth dockyards where her nine-pounder guns were removed and replaced with twenty 32-pounder carronades. The Royal Navy recommissioned her on 26 March 1798 as Hyaena, under the command of Captain Courtnay Boyle. Hyaena then served off Cherbourg, Saint-Malo, and the Île de Batz. On 19 September Hyaena was anchored in Graveling Bay. On setting out to sea she struck a rock and was gotten off only with some difficulty. On 2 February 1799 Boyle was appointed to escort a convoy from Plymouth to Lisbon and Gibraltar. However, Boyle was compelled to resign his appointment as a result of injuries that he sustained in March when he was thrown from a carriage before he could sail for Lisbon.

In March 1799 Captain David Lloyd replaced Boyle, and sailed Hyaena for the Mediterranean on 4 March. In January 1801, Captain William Granger replaced Lloyd, with Hyaena serving in the Baltic. She did participate in the expedition to the Baltic, but is not listed among the vessels whose crews qualified for the Naval General Service Medal that the Admiralty awarded in 1847 for participation in the battle of Copenhagen.

Disposal: The "Principal Officers and Commissioners of His Majesty's Navy" advised that on 24 February 1802, "Hyæna, 522 Tons, Copper-bottomed and Copper fastened, lying at Deptford", would be put up for sale. Hyaena was sold out of naval service at Deptford Dockyard that month.

== Whaler Recovery ==
Daniel Bennett purchased Hyaena and renamed her Recovery. She first entered Lloyd's Register in 1804 with Wm. Bacon, master, D. Bennett, owner, and trade London–Southern Fishery. Recovery was valued at £9,000 in 1802. She appeared on the Protection Lists in 1803, 1804, 1805, 1809, and 1810.

Captain William Beacon received a letter of marque on 25 May 1803.

=== 1st whaling voyage (1803) ===
Captain William Beacon sailed on 21 June 1803. On 28 June 1803 Lloyd's List reported that the whaler Recovery had sent into Portsmouth the Swedish brig Ceres, which had been sailing from Lubeck to Marseilles. However, the authorities restored (released) Ceres, Manlaws, master.

=== 2nd whaling voyage (1804–1805) ===
Captain William Beacon sailed from England on 17 June 1804, bound for the Isle of Desolation. Recovery was reported to have been there in February–March 1805. She returned to England on 10 September 1805.

=== 3rd whaling voyage (1805–1807) ===
Captain Beacon sailed from England on 2 December 1805. He returned on 2 July 1807.

=== 4th whaling voyage (1807–1810) ===
Captain Bacon (Beacon) sailed from England on 11 September 1807. Recovery, "Robertson", master, arrived at Port Jackson on 23 July 1808 with troops from England. She left on 25 October, bound for New Georgia. She returned to England on 9 February 1810.

=== 5th whaling voyage (1810–1811) ===
Captain Mark Munro sailed from England on 5 April 1810. He returned on 17 May 1811.

=== 6th whaling voyage (1811–1812) ===
Captain John Clark Spencer sailed from England on 2 July 1811. He returned on 29 May 1812.

=== 7th whaling voyage (1812–1813) ===
Captain Cannel sailed from England in 1812. (Note: The master's name is also recorded as Thomas Bennett, and Bennet.) Recovery returned on 18 April 1813.

== Fate ==
Recovery was broken up in 1813.

Daniel Bennett purchased HMS Lynx, named her Recovery, and sent her whaling. Her captain on her next five voyages was Captain William Beacon. The duplication of vessel names and masters between the two Recovery whalers has led to some conflation of the vessels. (Note: Clayton both conflates an separates the two vessels.)
