= Hector (1781 ship) =

British merchant and slave ship 1781–1804

History

Great Britain
- Name: Hector
- Owner: 1781:John Maxse; 1802:Thomas Parr
- Launched: 1781, Bristol
- Captured: 1804

General characteristics
- Tons burthen: 338, or 361, or 400 (bm)
- Complement: 1794:25; 1803:35
- Armament: 1795:10 × 4&6-pounder guns; 1801:4 × 6-pounder + 2 × 4-pounder guns; 1803:18 × 9-pounder guns

Hector was launched at Bristol in 1781 as a West Indiaman. A new owner in 1802 sailed Hector as a slave ship in the triangular trade in enslaved people. She made one complete voyage transporting enslaved people before a French privateer captured her on her second such voyage after Hector had disembarked her captives.

== Career ==
Hector entered Lloyd's Register (LR) in 1783. Between 1781 and 1783, LR conflated her with the Bristol-built Orange Valley. (Note: Unfortunately, Farr has no mention of Orange Valley, probably because Orange Valley was captured and burnt in 1796.) The following data is for Orange Valley.

Year	Master	Owner	Trade	Source
1781	C.Watson	Meyler & Co.	Bristol–Jamaica	LR
1782	C.Watson	Meyler & Co.	Bristol–Jamaica	LR; "Now the Hector, Ronaldson"
1783	C.Watson	Gordon & Co.	Bristol–Jamaica	LR

The following data is for Hector, with the data for 1783 still reflecting the confusion.

Year	Master	Owner	Trade	Source
1783	Ronaldson	Meyler & Co.	Bristol–Jamaica	LR; former "Orange Valley"
1786	Ronaldson	Maxse & Co.	Bristol–Jamaica	LR

Captain Thomas Harvey acquired a letter of marque on 30 January 1795.

Year	Master	Owner	Trade	Source & notes
1795	Ronaldson; T.Harvey	Maxse & Co.	Bristol–Jamaica	LR; good repair 175
1799	T.Harvey; A. Ball	Maxse & Co.	Bristol–Jamaica	LR; damages repaired 1785, & repairs 1796 & 1798
1802	A.Ball; J.Williams	Maxse & Co. T. Parr	Bristol–Jamaica; Liverpool–Africa	LR; damages repaired 1785, repairs 1796 & 1798, & large repair 1802

1st voyage transporting enslaved people (1802–1803): Captain Joseph Williams sailed from Liverpool on 3 June 1802. In 1802, 155 vessels sailed from English ports on voyages to acquire and transport enslaved people; 122 sailed from Liverpool.

Hector acquired captives at Calabar and arrived at Trinidad on 9 January 1803 with 339 captives. She sailed for Liverpool on 20 February and arrived there on 8 April. She had left Liverpool with 37 crew members and had suffered seven crew deaths on the voyage.

2nd voyage transporting enslaved people (1803–loss): War with France had resumed shortly before Hector had returned to Liverpool from her first voyage transporting enslaved people. Before Captain Williams sailed again he acquired a letter of marque on 23 May 1803. Hector sailed from Liverpool on 8 June. In 1803, 99 vessels sailed from English ports on voyages to acquire and transport enslaved people; 83 sailed from Liverpool.

Hector acquired captives at Calabar and arrived at Demerara on 14 January 1804 with 300 captives. She sailed for Liverpool on 27 February. She had left Liverpool with 37 crew members and she had suffered seven crew deaths on her voyage. Parr sold Hector while she was on her way to Demerara.

== Fate ==
Lloyd's List reported on 4 May 1804 that privateers had captured Sarah, Cannell, master, Caldicot Castle, Skerrett, master, and Hector, Williams, master, and taken them into Guadeloupe. Lloyd's List reported that the three were sailing to Liverpool from Demerara. However, Sarah was not. She was coming into Demerara with captives from Africa. Her captor took her to Guadeloupe.

Caldicot Castle's captor was the privateer Grand Decide, which had brought two prizes into Guadeloupe, suggesting that she may also have been the captor of Hector. (Note: Grand Décidé was a privateer under Mathieu Goy, commissioned in Guadeloupe in January 1804. She had a crew of 220 men and was armed with twenty-two 8-pounder guns.)

In 1804, 30 British ships in the triangular trade in enslaved were lost. Only one was lost homeward-bound after having disembarked slaves.
