= Scipion-class ship of the line =

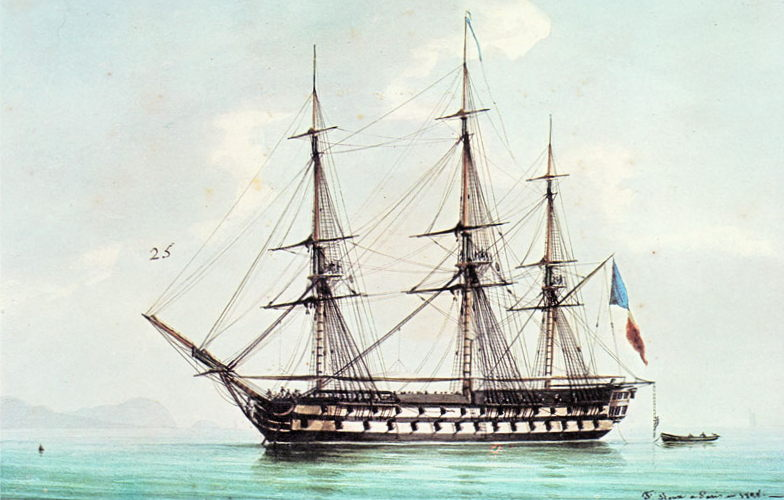
- Illustration of Pluton

Class overview
- Name: Scipion
- Operators: French Navy
- Succeeded by: Argonaute class
- Completed: 3
- Lost: 1
- Scrapped: 2

General characteristics
- Type: Ship of the line
- Displacement: 2,943 tonneaux
- Tons burthen: 1,424 port tonneaux
- Length: 53.8 m (176 ft 6 in)
- Beam: 14.1 m (46 ft 3 in)
- Draught: 7.3 m (23 ft 11 in)
- Propulsion: Sails
- Armament: 74 to 78 guns of various weights of shot

The Scipion class was a class of three 74-gun ships of the line built to a design by François-Guillaume Clairin-Deslauriers, the ingénieur-constructeur en chef at Rochefort Dockyard. These were the shortest 74-gun ships built by France since the 1750s, and they were found to lack stability as a consequence. The third ship - originally the Pluton - was 'girdled' (sheathed) with 32 cm of pine at Rochefort in 1799 to overcome her instability, and the design of two further ships ordered at the same dockyard in 1779 were lengthened.

- Scipion

Builder: Rochefort Dockyard
Ordered: early 1778
Begun: 10 April 1778
Launched: 19 September 1778
Completed: February 1779
Fate: Wrecked in Samana Bay, off San Domingo on 19 October 1782.

- Hercule

Builder: Rochefort Dockyard
Ordered: early 1778
Begun: 1 April 1778
Launched: 5 October 1778
Completed: February 1779
Fate: Razéed to 50-gun frigate in February to June 1794, and renamed Hydre in May 1795; discarded 1797.

- Pluton

Builder: Rochefort Dockyard
Ordered: early 1778
Begun: 10 April 1778
Launched: 5 November 1778
Completed: February 1779
Fate: Renamed Dugommier on 17 December 1797. Taken to pieces at Brest in 1805.
