= HMS Alfred (1778) =

Ship of the line of the Royal Navy

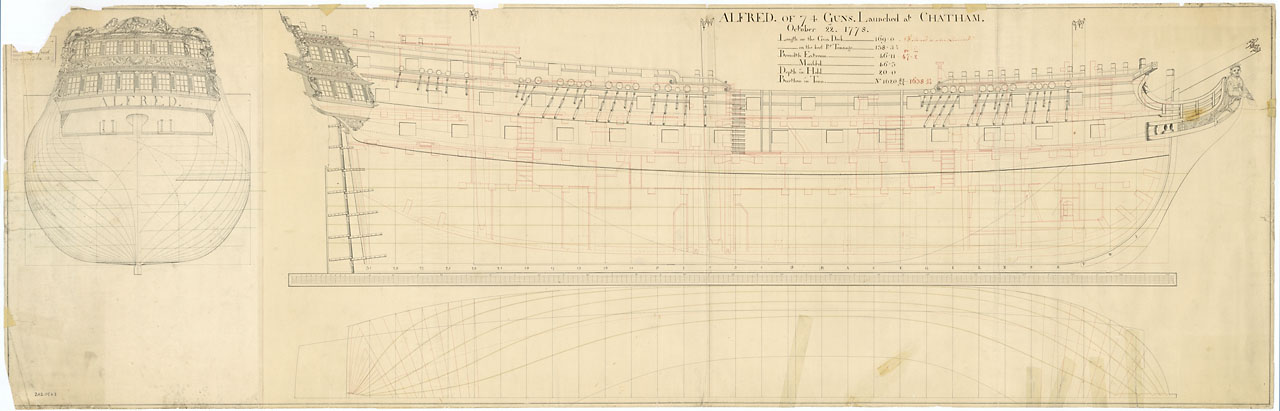
- Alfred

History

Great Britain
- Name: HMS Alfred
- Ordered: 13 August 1772
- Builder: Joseph Harris (August 1772 - March 1773); William Gray (March 1773 - February 1774); Israel Pownoll (February 1774 - October 1778)
- Laid down: November 1772 at Chatham Dockyard
- Launched: 22 October 1778
- Fate: Broken up, 1814
- Notes: Participated in: Battle of Cape St Vincent

General characteristics
- Class & type: Alfred-class ship of the line
- Tons burthen: 1638 37/94 (bm)
- Length: 169 ft (52 m) (gundeck)
- Beam: 47 ft 2 in (14.38 m)
- Depth of hold: 20 ft (6.1 m)
- Propulsion: Sails
- Sail plan: Full-rigged ship
- Armament: Gundeck: 28 × 32-pounder guns; Upper gundeck: 28 × 18-pounder guns; QD: 14 × 9-pounder guns; Fc: 4 × 9-pounder guns

HMS Alfred was a 74-gun third rate ship of the line of the Royal Navy, launched on 22 October 1778 at Chatham Dockyard.

== Career ==
She fought at the Battle of Cape St Vincent in 1780.

Alfred (middle left) at the Battle of Saint Kitts

She was at the Battle of Saint Kitts, also known as the Battle of Frigate Bay, that took place on 25 and 26 January 1782 during the American Revolutionary War between a British fleet under Rear-Admiral Sir Samuel Hood and a larger French fleet under the Comte de Grasse. In the Battle of the Saintes on 9 April 1782 she led Hood's van squadron at the head of the fleet, under the command of Captain John Bligh.

Lloyd's List reported on 17 May 1795 that Alfred had captured a French 22-gun corvette off Cape Finisterre. The corvette had been sailing to the West Indies and Alfred took her into Barbados. In December 1795 she was caught in a storm off Devonport resulting in drowning of seven crew members and the loss of her main mizzen and fore topmasts.

== Fate ==
Alfred was broken up in 1814.
