= French ship Brave (1781) =

Ship of the line of the French Navy

History

France
- Name: Brave
- Namesake: Brave
- Builder: Rochefort
- Laid down: October 1779
- Launched: 6 June 1781
- In service: November 1781
- Out of service: 1801
- Fate: Hulked 1799

General characteristics
- Class & type: Argonaute-class ship of the line
- Displacement: 2,943 tonneaux
- Tons burthen: 1,424 port tonneaux
- Length: 55.2 m (181 ft 1 in)
- Beam: 14.3 m (46 ft 11 in)
- Draught: 7.4 m (24 ft 3 in)
- Propulsion: Sail
- Armament: 74 guns: 28 × 36-pounders; 30 × 18-pounders; 16 × 8-pounders; Later razéed to 52

Brave was a 74-gun Argonaute-class ship of the line of the French Navy.

Commissioned in 1781, she was put in the reserve in 1788, but reactivated in March 1791. Two years later, she was decommissioned again, and razeed to a 52-gun frigate. She took part in the Biscay campaign of June 1795 under Captain Antoine René Thévenard.

She later served under Captain Rolland, and was used as a hulk in Toulon from 1798.
