= French ship Borée (1785) =

Ship of the line of the French Navy

- Scale model of Achille, sister ship of French ship Borée (1785), on display at the Musée national de la Marine in Paris.

History

France
- Name: Borée
- Namesake: Boreas
- Builder: Lorient
- Laid down: January 1783
- Launched: 17 November 1785
- Commissioned: August 1787
- Decommissioned: 1803
- Fate: Broken up, 1803

General characteristics
- Displacement: 3,069 tonneaux
- Tons burthen: 1,537 port tonneaux
- Length: 55.87 m (183 ft 4 in)
- Beam: 14.46 m (47 ft 5 in)
- Draught: 7.15 m (23.5 ft)
- Depth of hold: 7.15 m (23 ft 5 in)
- Sail plan: Full-rigged ship
- Crew: 705
- Armament: 74 guns: Lower gun deck: 28 × 36-pounder long guns; Upper gun deck: 30 × 18-pounder long guns; Forecastle and Quarterdeck: 12 × 8-pounder long guns, 10 × 36-pounder carronades

Borée was a 74-gun Téméraire-class ship of the line built for the French Navy during the 1780s. Completed in 1787, she played a minor role in the French Revolutionary Wars.

== Description ==
The Téméraire-class ships had a length of 55.87 metres (183 ft 4 in), a beam of 14.46 metres (47 ft 5 in) and a depth of hold of 7.15 metres (23 ft 5 in). The ships displaced 3,069 tonneaux and had a mean draught of 7.15 metres (23 ft 5 in). They had a tonnage of 1,537 port tonneaux. Their crew numbered 705 officers and ratings during wartime. They were fitted with three masts and ship rigged.

The muzzle-loading, smoothbore armament of the Téméraire class consisted of twenty-eight 36-pounder long guns on the lower gun deck, thirty 18-pounder long guns and thirty 18-pounder long guns on the upper gun deck. On the quarterdeck and forecastle were a total of a dozen 8-pounder long guns and ten 36-pounder carronades.

== Construction and career ==
Borée was laid down at the Arsenal de Lorient in November 1784 and launched on 17 November 1785. She was completed in August 1787. In 1790, she joined the Brest squadron. Between May 1792 and January 1793, under Captain de Grimouard, she escorted a convoy from Saint Domingue to Rochefort, before being decommissioned in February 1793. On 12 April 1794, she was ordered razeed into a 50-gun frigate and renamed Ça Ira on 1 June and then Agricola two months later. Recommissioned on 24 June, she served for two years before being hulked in Rochefort and used as a hospital ship. She was eventually broken up in 1803.
