= Dutch cutter Kemphaan =

History

Dutch Republic
- Name: de Kemphaan
- Builder: Cutter: P. v. Zwinjndregt, Rotterdam; Brig-sloop conversion: P. v. Zwinjndregt, Rotterdam
- Launched: 1781
- Captured: 22 August 1799

Great Britain
- Name: HMS Camphaan
- Acquired: 22 August 1799 by capture
- Fate: Broken up April 1802 (Note: Van Maanen states that Kemphaan was broken up in 1797, but this appears completely incorrect.)

General characteristics
- Type: brig-sloop
- Tons burthen: 262 (bm)
- Length: Cutter: 70' (Amsterdam foot) (Note: All linear measurements are in Amsterdam feet (voet) of 11 Amsterdam inches (duim) (see Dutch units of measurement). The Amsterdam foot is about 8% shorter than an English foot. The data is from the Rotterdams jaarboekje.); Brig-sloop:87'
- Beam: Cutter: 28'; Brig-sloop: 28' 4/11
- Depth of hold: Cutter: 12' 1/11 (Note: Van Maanen gives the hold depth as 12'9/11.); Brig-sloop:13'
- Propulsion: Sails
- Complement: 70 (1792)
- Armament: Cutter: 12 guns; Brig-sloop:18 guns; British service: 16 × 6-pounder guns

The Dutch cutter Kemphaan, meaning "game cock", was launched in 1781 as a 12-gun advice boat, with a mission of carrying dispatches between the Netherlands and its colonies. The Dutch increased her length by almost a quarter in 1787, gave her six more guns, and made a brig-sloop out of her. The British captured her in 1799 when they captured Suriname. She then served briefly in the Royal Navy as HMS Camphaan before she was broken up in early 1802.

== Dutch service and capture ==
There are accounts of Kemphaan's service in the 1780s (in Dutch). In August 1781 she was at the battle of Dogger Bank.

In 1782 she was under the command of Lieutenant Johannes Janse Eye (Jean Jantzen Eye). In 1787 the Dutch extended Kemphaan and converted her to a brig-sloop. Between October 1793 and 31 August 1794, Captain Frans Smeer escorted a convoy of merchantmen to the West Indies.

On 20 August 1799, a British force under the command of Lieutenant-General Thomas Trigge and Vice Admiral the Right Honourable Lord Hugh Seymour captured the Dutch colony of Suriname. Among the various items of booty was the Dutch brig-sloop Kemphaan and the French corvette Hussard. Kemphaan was under the command of Kaptain P. Smeer, and was described as having an armament of sixteen 6-pounder guns. Seymour appointed Lieutenant Richard Thwaite, of Prince of Wales to command Camphaan.

== Fate ==
Camphaan was sold in April 1802 for breaking up.
