= Orange Valley (1781 ship) =

British merchant ship 1781–1796

History

Great Britain
- Name: Orange Valley
- Launched: 1781, Bristol
- Captured: Captured and burnt 21 July 1796

General characteristics
- Tons burthen: 400 (bm)
- Armament: 20 × 12-pounder guns

Orange Valley was launched at Bristol in 1781 as a West Indiaman. A French squadron captured and burnt her on 21 July 1796.

== Career ==
Orange Valley entered Lloyd's Register (LR) in 1781. Between 1781 and 1783, LR conflated her with the Bristol-built Hector.

Year	Master	Owner	Trade	Source & notes
1781	C.Watson	Meyler & Co.	Bristol–Jamaica	LR
1782	C.Watson	Meyler & Co.	Bristol–Jamaica	LR; "Now the Hector, Ronaldson"
1783	C.Watson	Gordon & Co.	Bristol–Jamaica	LR
1790	C.Watson; J.Thompson	Gordon & Co.	Bristol–Jamaica	LR
1792	J.Thompson; P.Wade	Gordon & Co. J.Rodgers	Bristol–Jamaica; Bristol–Honduras	LR; good repair 1791
1796	P.Wade	Captain	Bristol–Jamaica	LR; good repair 1791

== Fate ==
A French squadron captured Orange Valley, Wade, master, in the Atlantic Ocean and burnt her. She was on a voyage from Jamaica to Bristol.
