= Fonthill (1783 ship) =

History

France
- Launched: 1781
- Captured: 1782

Great Britain
- Name: Fonthill
- Owner: 1783:Wildman & Co.; 1791:Shodbread & Co., or Schoolbred; 1796:W. Sims, or Simms
- Acquired: c.1782 (by purchase?)
- Fate: Last listed in 1810

General characteristics
- Tons burthen: 266, or 300, or 313 (bm)
- Armament: 6 × 6-pounder guns

Fonthill was a ship built in France in 1781 and was probably taken in prize in 1782. Fonthill sailed as a West Indiaman between 1783 and 1791, then became a whaler southern whale fishery and made four whaling voyages between 1791 and 1799. On her third voyage she took back from Cape Town a Dutch captain whose vessel had been captured bringing in arms and ammunition from Batavia to stir up unrest against the British at the Cape. After refitting, in 1800, Fonthill became a whaler in the northern whale fishery. Fonthill was last listed, with stale data, in 1810, but whose last reported whaling voyage took place in 1806.

== West Indiaman ==
Fonthill entered Lloyd's Register in 1783 with P. Seward, master, Wildman & Co., owner, and trade London–Jamaica.

== Southern whaler ==
Lloyd's Register for 1791 showed Fonthill with P. Seward, master, changing to Pinkham, Wildman, owner, changing to Shodbread, and trade London–Jamaica, changing to London–South Seas.

1st southern whaling voyage (1791-1793): Captain Elisha Pinkham sailed from London on 4 December 1791, bound for the Pacific. (Note: Pinkham was a Nantucket Quaker.) In 1792 Fonthill sailed in company in the Pacific with the American whaler Rebecca, Seth Folger, master. Fonthill returned to London on 4 July 1793 with 86 tuns of sperm oil, six tuns of whale oil, and 11,476 seal skins.

2nd southern whaling voyage (1793-1795): Captain Jethro Daggett sailed from London in 1793, bound for Peru. Fonthill returned on 19 December 1795 with 105 tuns of sperm oil, 104 tuns of whale oil, and 78 Cwt. of whale bone.

3rd southern whaling voyage (1796-1797): Captain William Allen Day sailed from London on 30 November 1796. Fonthill arrived at the Cape of Good Hope on 12 October 1797 from Delagoa Bay. She sailed two days later with a prisoner, Jacob de Freyn (or Joh. de Frein). Governor Macartney, of the Cape Colony, was sending him back to be detained in England for as long as possible. (Note: de Freyn had been captain of a brig, a packet, belonging to the Dutch East India Company: (Haasje; Hare) that had been fitted out at Batavia by the Dutch to sail to Delagoa Bay to land arms and ammunition to be transferred to Graaff-Reinet to raise unrest there against the British. The Portuguese had seized the brig at Delagoa and put de Freyn on Fonthill, which carried him to the Cape. Macartney wrote to War Secretary Henry Dundas, advising that the British government should delay releasing or exchanging de Freyn as he was a "very shrewd and dangerous fellow". Actually, the British whaler Hope had seized Hare and a prize crew had brought her into the Cape.) Fonthill arrived back at London on 19 December 1797.

4th southern whaling voyage (1798-1799): Captain Day sailed from London in 1798, bound for the east coast of Africa. Fonthill returned on 12 November 1799.

== Northern whaler ==
Fonthill left the Register of Shipping in 1801, but re-entered in 1802 with Peacock, master, W. Sims, owner, and trade London–Greenland. She had been almost rebuilt in 1800 with new top and sides, and some repair of damages.

The Register of Shipping for 1806 showed Fonthill with Robinson, master, W. Sims, owner, and trade London–Greenland. She had undergone damage repairs in 1802, 1803, and 1804.

In July 1804, Fonthill, Kitchen, master, returned to London from the northern fisheries having taken four "fish" (whales).

In July 1805, Fonthill, "of and for London", was reported to have returned from the whaling grounds at Davis Strait as a "full ship", having taken ten fish.

In early July 1806, Fonthill, of London, Peacock, master, was reported to have returned with four fish.

== Fate ==
Fonthill was last listed in the Register of Shipping in 1806, and in Lloyd's Register in 1810, with stale data.
