= Saint-Germain-du-Seudre =

- Commune
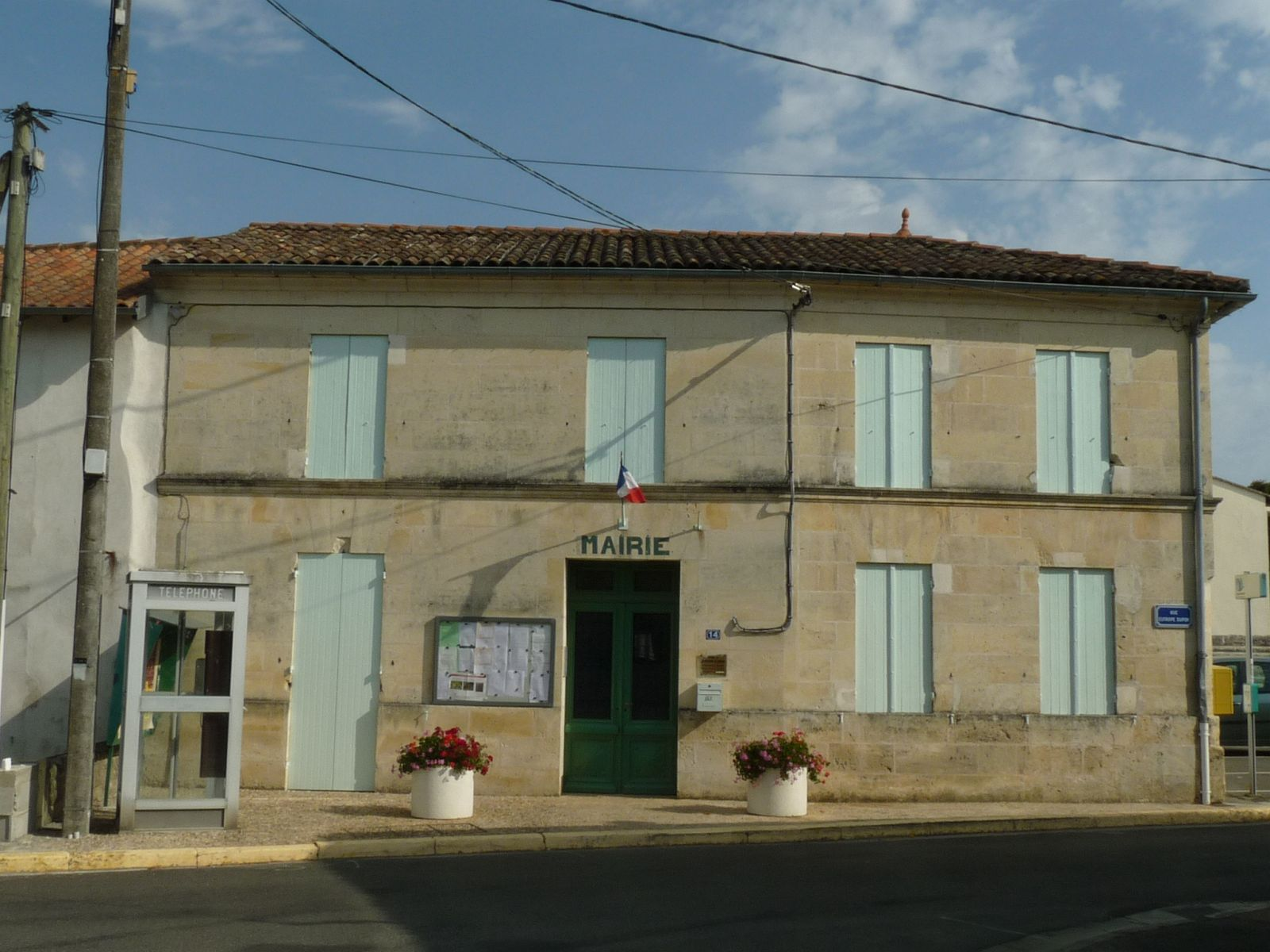
- Town hall
- Location of Saint-Germain-du-Seudre
- Location within France Location within Nouvelle-Aquitaine
- Coordinates: 45°30′43″N 0°40′02″W
- Country: France
- Region: Nouvelle-Aquitaine
- Department: Charente-Maritime
- Arrondissement: Jonzac
- Canton: Pons
- Intercommunality: Haute-Saintonge

Government
  - Mayor (2020–2026): Marie-Hélène Conte
- Area^{1}: 16.09 km^{2} (6.21 sq mi)
- Elevation: 30 m (98 ft)
- Highest elevation: 54 m (177 ft)
- Lowest elevation: 22 m (72 ft)
- Population (2023): 407
  - Density: 25.3/km^{2} (65.5/sq mi)
- Time zone: UTC+01:00 (CET)
  - Summer (DST): UTC+02:00 (CEST)
- INSEE/Postal code: 17342 /17240
- ^{1} French Land Register data, which excludes lakes, ponds, glaciers > 1 km^{2} (0.386 sq mi or 247 acres) and river estuaries.

Saint-Germain-du-Seudre (French pronunciation: [sɛ̃ ʒɛʁmɛ̃ dy sødʁ], literally Saint Germain of the Seudre) is a small historic town on the Gironde estuary. It is a commune in the Charente-Maritime department in southwestern France.

The nearest market town is Gémozac. It is noted for its numerous vineyards, sunflower fields and the former wheat mill located in 'Moulin De La Barre'. Eutrope Dupon (1823-1897), born in Saint-Germain-du-Seudre, was a deputy (congressman) in the French National Assembly from 1893 to 1897. There is a bust of him in St-Germain.

== Population ==
Historical population
Year	Pop.	±% p.a.
1968	399	—
1975	378	−0.77%
1982	363	−0.58%
1990	346	−0.60%
1999	330	−0.52%
2007	368	+1.37%
2012	385	+0.91%
2017	433	+2.38%
2023	407	−1.03%
Source: INSEE

== See also ==
- Communes of the Charente-Maritime department
