= Iphigénie-class frigate =

Group of nine 32-gun/12-pounder frigates of the French Navy

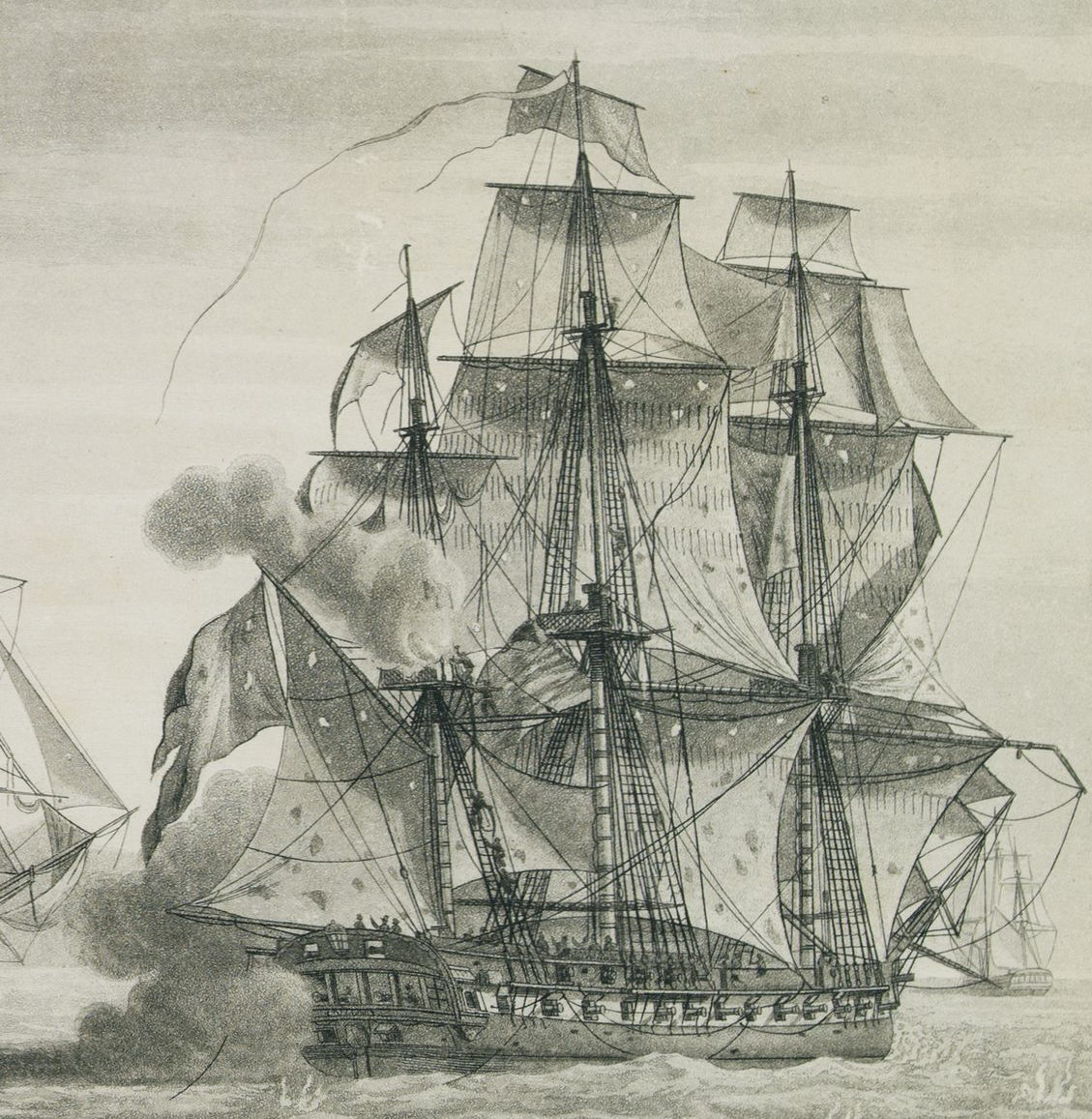
- Bellone at the Battle of Tory Island

Class overview
- Name: Iphigénie class
- Builders: Lorient and Saint-Malo
- Operators: French Navy; Royal Navy
- Completed: 9

General characteristics
- Type: frigate
- Displacement: 1,150 tonneaux
- Tons burthen: 620 port tonneaux
- Length: 43.53 m (142 ft 10 in) (overall); 38.98 m (127 ft 11 in) (keel)
- Beam: 11.21 m (36 ft 9 in)
- Depth of hold: 5.68 m (18 ft 8 in)
- Propulsion: Sail
- Armament: 32 guns: 26 × 12-pounder long guns; 6 × 6-pounder long guns; Several had 2 or 4 x 36-pounder obusiers added
- Armour: Timber

The Iphigénie class was a ship class of nine 32-gun frigates built for the French Navy during the late 1770s at Lorient (2 ships) and Saint-Malo (7 ships). They were designed by the French shipwright Léon Guignace. The seven built at Saint-Malo were initially numbered Nos. 1 – 7 respectively, and not given names until October 1777 (for Nos 1 – 4) and the start of 1778 (Nos. 5 – 7); all seven were captured by the British Navy between 1779 and the end of 1800. Of the two built at Lorient, the Spanish captured one, and a storm wrecked the other.

- Iphigénie

Builder: Gilles Cambry at Lorient Dockyard
Ordered:
Laid down: February 1777
Launched: 16 October 1777
Completed: March 1778
Fate: Captured by the Spanish in February 1795, becoming Spanish Ifigenia.

- Surveillante

Builder: Gilles Cambry at Lorient Dockyard
Ordered:
Laid down: August 1777
Launched: 26 March 1778
Completed: May 1778
Fate: Wrecked in a storm in Bantry Bay, January 1797

- Résolue (ex No.1)

Builder: Saint-Malo Dockyard
Ordered:
Laid down: July 1777
Launched: 16 March 1778
Completed: April 1778
Fate: Captured by the British 14 October 1798, becoming HMS Resolue.

- Gentille (ex No.2)

Builder: Saint-Malo Dockyard
Ordered:
Laid down: July 1777
Launched: 18 June 1778
Completed: August 1778
Fate: Captured by the British 11 April 1795, becoming HMS Gentille.

- Amazone (ex No.3)

Builder: Saint-Malo Dockyard
Ordered:
Laid down: August 1777
Launched: 11 May 1778
Completed: July 1778
Fate: Captured by the British 29 July 1782, but retaken by a French squadron the following day; wrecked off the Penmarch Islands January 1797.

- Prudente (ex No.4)

Builder: Saint-Malo Dockyard
Ordered:
Laid down: August 1777
Launched: late March 1778
Completed: July 1778
Fate: Captured by the British 2 June 1779, becoming HMS Prudente.

- Gloire (ex No.5)

Builder: Saint-Malo Dockyard
Ordered:
Laid down: January 1778
Launched: 9 July 1778
Completed: October 1778
Fate: Captured by the British 10 April 1795, becoming HMS Gloire.

- Bellone (ex No.6)

Builder: Saint-Malo Dockyard
Ordered:
Laid down: January 1778
Launched: 2 August 1778
Completed: February 1779
Fate: Captured by the British 12 October 1798, becoming HMS Proserpine.

- Médée (ex No.7)

Builder: Saint-Malo Dockyard
Ordered:
Laid down: January 1778
Launched: 23 September 1778
Completed: February 1779
Fate: Captured by the British 5 August 1800, becoming HMS Medee.
