= HMS Warrior (1781) =

Ship of the line of the Royal Navy

- Warrior (centre) off Reefness in September 1807

History

Great Britain
- Name: HMS Warrior
- Ordered: 13 July 1773
- Builder: Portsmouth Dockyard
- Laid down: November 1773
- Launched: 18 October 1781
- Commissioned: October 1781
- Fate: Broken up, 1857
- Notes: Participated in: Battle of the Saintes; Battle of the Mona Passage; Battle of Copenhagen; Battle of Cape Finisterre

General characteristics
- Class & type: Alfred-class ship of the line
- Tons burthen: 1,642 (bm)
- Length: 169 ft (52 m) (gundeck)
- Beam: 47 ft 2 in (14.38 m)
- Depth of hold: 20 ft (6.1 m)
- Propulsion: Sails
- Sail plan: Full-rigged ship
- Armament: Gundeck: 28 × 32-pounder guns; Upper gundeck: 28 × 18-pounder guns; QD: 14 × 9-pounder guns; Fc: 4 × 9-pounder guns

HMS Warrior was a 74-gun Alfred-class third-rate ship of the line of the Royal Navy, launched on 18 October 1781 at Portsmouth.

== Service history ==
A year after her launch she took part in the Battle of the Saintes captained by Sir James Wallace. She fought in the van of Admiral Sir George Rodney's fleet, taking twenty-six total casualties. Through this action Warrior lost her main topmast two days later. In July she transported Lieutenant-General Sir Robert Pigot to America. Warrior was laid up at Portsmouth between 1784 and 1795.

In 1801, she was part of Admiral Sir Hyde Parker's reserve squadron at the Battle of Copenhagen. Warrior then joined the Channel fleet off Brest to assist in deterring French invasion.

In 1805, she was part of Admiral Robert Calder's fleet at the Battle of Cape Finisterre under Samuel Hood Linzee. Later in December of that year she was involved in towing HMS Victory to Spithead. By 1806 she was assisting HMS Renown and HMS Minerva in attacking coastal trade around Ferrol and Vigo. In December Warrior became flagship in the Channel.

From 1809 to 1811 Warrior was based in the Mediterranean. In October 1809 she assisted in capturing the islands of Zante and Cephalonia to stop the French from using them as outposts, with her guns covering the advance of the invasion force.

While under the command of Captain the Viscount Torrington in 1813, Warrior was the ship chosen to convey Prince Frederick of the Netherlands to his homeland for the first time.

On 10 August 1815, Warrior collided with the British merchant ship George in the Atlantic Ocean. George foundered with the loss of four lives. Warrior rescued her survivors. In the same year Warrior served as the flagship of John Erskine Douglas on the Jamaica Station.

== Fate ==
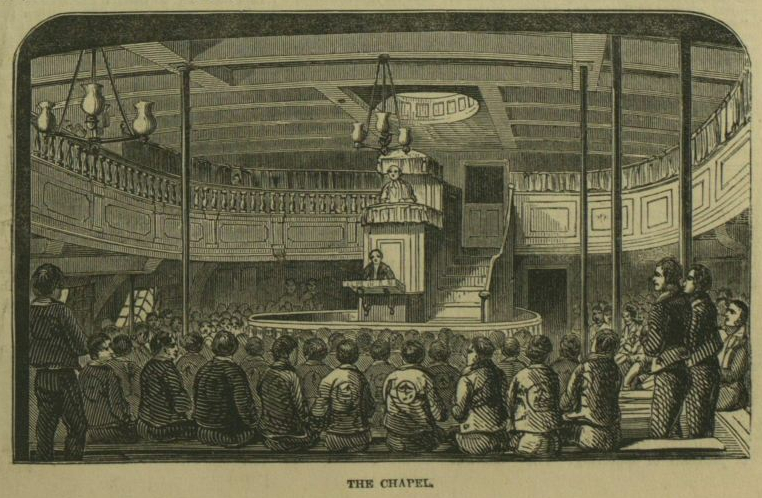
The chapel on the Warrior prison ship in 1846

Warrior was laid up in September 1815 at Chatham. She became a receiving ship in August 1819 and was a temporary quarantine ship in 1831. She was fitted as a prison ship after 1840, and was eventually broken up in December 1857 at Woolwich.
