= Hope (1770 ship) =

History

Great Britain
- Name: Hope
- Owner: W. Wilton
- Builder: Liverpool
- Launched: 1770
- Fate: Last listed in 1798

General characteristics
- Tons burthen: 245, or 300 (bm)

Hope was built at Liverpool in 1770, though it is not clear under what name. She first appeared in Lloyd's Register (LR) in 1786 as a Greenlandman, a whaler in the British northern whale fishery. From 1789 on she was a whaler in the British southern whale fishery. She then made five whaling voyages to Africa or the South Pacific. On the fifth she captured Haasje; this resulted in a court case over the distribution of prize money. Hope was last listed in 1798.

== Origins ==
Hope's early years are obscure. She first appeared in LR in 1786 with J. Beddy, master, replaced by J. Iseman, W. Wilton, owner, and trade London–Greenland. The entry gave her origin as Liverpool, and her launch year as 1770. It also reported that she underwent a good repair in 1785. Missing volumes, and missing pages in extant volumes, have made it impossible to identify her earlier history. Searches for vessels launched at Liverpool in 1770 have turned up no candidates. A compendium of vessels on the Liverpool Registry in 1786–88 yielded nothing. The report that she underwent a good repair in 1785 suggests that she may have been a naval vessel, though they were rarely built in Liverpool, or possibly a government transport, perhaps sailing under another name, but prepared for sale. The 1785 volume of Lloyd's Register is among the many from the earlier years that are not available online.

== Southern whale fishery ==
Hope appeared in Lloyd's Register for 1790 with W. Bunker, master, W. Wilton, owner, and trade London–Southern Fishery. She had undergone good repairs in 1785, 1787, and 1789.

Southern whaling voyage #1: Captain William Bunker sailed from London on 12 November 1789. Hope may have returned around May 1791.

Southern whaling voyage #2: Captain Bunker sailed from England on 28 July 1791, bound for Peru. Hope returned to England on 18 December 1792. Her captain on the return may have been Zachariah Bunker.

Southern whaling voyage #3: Captain William Bunker may have sailed in February 1793. It is not clear when Hope returned.

Southern whaling voyage #4: Captain William Bunker sailed in 1794, bound for Delagoa Bay. Hope returned on 20 February 1796 with 13 tuns of sperm oil, 118 tuns of whale oil, and 100 Cwt. of whale bone.

Lloyd's Register for 1797 showed Hope with Z. Bunker, master, Wilton, owner, and trade London–Southern Fishery. She had undergone good repairs in 1785, 1787, 1789, 1791, and 1796.

Southern whaling voyage #5: Hope sailed from London on 15 October 1796, bound for Delagoa Bay. Hope was at Delagoa in April 1797 when the Dutch brig Haasje (a.k.a. Haas, or Hare) arrived from Batavia with arms for Dutch settlers seeking to resist the British occupation of the Cape Colony. Hope succeeded in capturing Haasje on 22 May and sending her into the Cape. Hope returned to the Cape on 23 October 1797. She then disappears from online records.

Hope did not possess a letter of marque, and so the capture of Haase was by a non-commissioned vessel. Hence the prize became a Droits of Admiralty. The High Court of Admiralty ruled on 4 April 1799 that as Hope had faced resistance and that the capture had cost her the chief part of her voyage, the captors could retain the entire value of the prize (£2,900), with one-third to go to the owners and two-thirds to the master and crew. The money to captain and crew was to be divided according to the usual practices for private ships of war.

Hope was last listed in the 1798 volume of Lloyd's Register, but with stale data.
