= Alfred-class ship of the line =

- HMS Warrior (centre) off Reefness in September 1807

Class overview
- Name: Alfred class
- Operators: Royal Navy; French Navy
- Preceded by: Culloden class
- Succeeded by: Ganges class
- In service: 8 October 1778 – 1857
- Completed: 4

General characteristics
- Type: Ship of the line
- Length: 169 ft (52 m) (gundeck); 138 ft 5¼ in (42.3 m) (keel)
- Beam: 47 ft 2 in (14.38 m)
- Propulsion: Sails
- Armament: 74 guns: Gundeck: 28 × 32-pounders; Upper gundeck: 28 × 18-pounders; Quarterdeck: 14 × 9-pounders; Forecastle: 4 × 9-pounders
- Notes: Ships in class include: Alexander, Alfred, Warrior, Montague

The Alfred-class ships of the line were a class of four 74-gun third rates for the Royal Navy by Sir John Williams. They were an enlarged version of the Royal Oak class.

== Ships ==
- HMS Alexander

Builder: Deptford Dockyard
Ordered: 21 July 1773
Launched: 8 October 1778
Fate: Broken up, 1819

- HMS Alfred

Builder: Chatham Dockyard
Ordered: 13 August 1772
Launched: 22 October 1778
Fate: Broken up, 1814

- HMS Warrior

Builder: Portsmouth Dockyard
Ordered: 13 July 1773
Launched: 18 October 1781
Fate: Broken up, 1857

- HMS Montague

Builder: Chatham Dockyard
Ordered: 16 July 1774
Laid Down: 30 January 1775
Launched: 28 August 1779
Completed for Sea: 23 September 1779
Fate: Broken up, 1818

- A fifth ship Edgar was also ordered (16 July 1774) to this design, but on 25 August 1774 was altered to the modified Arrogant design.
