= French cutter Espion =

The French cutter Espion was a cutter launched in 1781. The British captured her and took her in 1782 into the Royal Navy as HMS Espion. The Royal Navy sold her in 1783.

== French service ==
Espion was one of the last of the Levrette-class cutters of Royal French Navy, built by Jacques and Daniel Denys at Dunkirk, and launched on 22 June 1781. On 7 December she and Sagittaire sailed as escorts to a convoy of ten transports taking supplies to the fleet of Admiral de Grasse at Martinique. The convoy arrived safely in January and from there sailed to bring shells to the forces under François Claude Amour, marquis de Bouillé, which were Basseterre, the chief port and capital of St Kitts.

On 24 January 1782 she encountered a British fleet under Admiral Sir Samuel Hood, which was sailing to try to relieve St Kitts. The sixth-rate frigate Lizard captured Espion near Nevis. Her captain was the Knight of Malta Lieutenant de Vaiseau Chevalier de Montluc de la Bourdonnaye. Hood described her as a large cutter, seven months old, and armed with sixteen 6-pounder guns.

Hood sailed on to Basseterre but the delay occasioned in capturing Espion gave de Grasse time to get out to sea. Although Hood was unable to relieve the siege, he was able to goad de Grasse into three futile attacks on the British fleet on 25 and 26 January. These attacks cost the British 172 men killed and 244 wounded; the French evacuated some 1000 wounded to Sint Eustatius. Hood then sailed away to Barbados. The Brimstone Hill redoubt at St Kitts surrendered on 13 February. Hood and Admiral George Rodney then met and defeated de Grasse at the Battle of the Saintes in early-April.

== Fate ==
The British took Espion into service under her existing name and commissioned her on 24 January under the command of Lieutenant Thomas Sevell Shivers. (Note: Shivers may already have been a Commander. He received his promotion from Lieutenant around 1782.) She then sailed for Britain in September 1782. The Admiralty sold Espion in April 1783.
