= French ship Argonaute (1781) =

Ship of the line of the French Navy

History

France
- Name: Argonaute
- Namesake: Argonaut
- Builder: Rochefort
- Laid down: August 1779
- Launched: 5 June 1781
- In service: December 1781
- Out of service: 1795
- Fate: Broken up

General characteristics
- Class & type: Argonaute-class ship of the line
- Displacement: 2,943 tonneaux
- Tons burthen: 1,424 port tonneaux
- Length: 55.2 m (181 ft 1 in)
- Beam: 14.3 m (46 ft 11 in)
- Draught: 7.4 m (24 ft 3 in)
- Propulsion: Sail
- Armament: 74 guns: 28 × 36-pounders; 30 × 18-pounders; 16 × 8-pounders; Later razéed to 52

Argonaute was a 74-gun ship of the line of the French Navy, lead ship of her class.

== Career ==
Argonaute served in Suffren's campaign in the Indian Ocean, taking part in the Battle of Cuddalore under Chevalier de Clavières.

In 1794, she was razéed and renamed to Flibustier, recommissioned as a 42-gun frigate.

She was decommissioned in December 1795.
