= Porcupine-class post ship =

Class overview
- Name: Porcupine-class post ships
- Operators: Royal Navy
- Completed: 10
- Lost: 6

General characteristics
- Type: Sixth-rate post ship
- Tons burthen: 513 55/94 (bm; as designed)
- Length: 114 ft 3 in (34.8 m) (gundeck); 94 ft 3 1/2 in (28.7 m) (keel)
- Beam: 32 ft (9.8 m)
- Depth of hold: 10 ft 3 in (3.1 m)
- Sail plan: Full-rigged ship
- Complement: 160
- Armament: Upperdeck: 22 × 9-pounder guns; QD 2 × 6-pounder guns

The Porcupine-class sailing sixth rates were a series of ten 24-gun post ships built to a 1776 design by John Williams, that served in the Royal Navy during the American War Of Independence. Some survived to serve again in the French Revolutionary and the Napoleonic Wars. The first two were launched in 1777. Three were launched in 1778, three more in 1779, and the last two in 1781.

== Design ==
John Williams, the Surveyor of the Navy, designed the class as a development of his earlier design (1773) for the 20-gun Sphinx class. The 1776 design enlarged the ship, which permitted the mounting of an eleventh pair of 9-pounder guns on the upper deck and two smaller (6-pounder) guns on the quarterdeck.

== Ships in class ==
The Admiralty ordered ten ships to this design over a period of two years. The contract for the first ship was agreed on 25 June 1776 with Greaves, for launching in July 1777; the second was agreed with Adams on 6 August 1776, for launching in May 1777. The contract price for each was £10½ per ton BM; they were named Porcupine and Pelican by Admiralty Order on 27 August 1776. The contract price for Penelope was £11½ per ton BM.

Name	Ordered	Builder	Begun	Launched	Completed	Fate
Porcupine	21 June 1776	Edward Greaves, Limehouse	July 1776	17 December 1777	14 February 1778 at Deptford Dockyard	Broken up at Woolwich in April 1805.
Pelican	24 July 1776	Adams & Barnard, Deptford	August 1776	24 April 1777	12 June 1777 at Deptford Dockyard	Wrecked off Jamaica in August 1781.
Eurydice	24 July 1776	Portsmouth; Dockyard	February 1777	26 March 1781	3 June 1781	Broken up at Deptford in March 1834.
Hyaena	9 October 1776	John Fisher, Liverpool	May 1777	2 March 1778	January 1779 at Portsmouth Dockyard	Sold at Deptford in February 1802.
Penelope	13 November 1776	Peter Baker, Liverpool	28 June 1777	25 June 1778	20 December 1778 at Plymouth Dockyard	Foundered in hurricane in October 1780.
Amphitrite	8 January 1776	Deptford Dockyard	2 July 1777	28 May 1778	22 July 1778	Wrecked off Livorno in January 1794.
Crocodile	8 January 1777	Portsmouth; Dockyard	February 1777	25 April 1781	12 June 1781	Wrecked off Prawle Point in May 1784.
Siren	30 September 1777	James Baker, Newcastle-upon-Tyne	21 January 1778	29 July 1779	4 March 1780 at Sheerness Dockyard	Wrecked off Seaford in January 1781.
Pandora	11 February 1778	Adams & Barnard, Deptford	2 March 1778	17 May 1779	3 July 1779 at Deptford Dockyard	Wrecked in Torres Strait in August 1791.
Champion	11 February 1778	John Barnard, Harwich	April 1778	17 May 1779	14 August 1779 at Sheerness Dockyard	Sold at Sheerness in August 1816.
