= William and Ann (1781 ship) =

Transport and trading vessel

History

Great Britain
- Owner: 1781: Will and Francis Skinner, and William Reynolds
- Builder: Whitby
- Launched: 1781
- Fate: Wrecked 1830

General characteristics
- Tons burthen: 341, or 344, or 400 (bm)
- Length: 101 ft (31 m)
- Beam: 29 ft (8.8 m)
- Armament: 1782: 10 × 6-pounder guns; 1783: 6 × 6-pounder guns; 1798: 6 × 6-pounder guns; 1805: 6 × 4-pounder guns

William and Ann was launched in 1781 at Whitby. From her launch until 1805 she alternated between being a transport and trading with the Baltic. In 1805 she became a whaler in the northern whale fishery . She wrecked in ice in 1830 in the Greenland fisheries on her 24th whaling voyage.

== Career ==
William and Ann first appeared in Lloyd's Register (LR) in 1781. When she was launched Great Britain was still at war and her initial service was as a transport. After the war ended in 1783, William and Ann started trading with the Baltic. Thereafter, she interspersed trading with the Baltic and service as a transport.

Year	Master	Owner	Trade	Source & notes
1781	W.Bridekirk	W.Skinner	Whitby	LR
1782	W.Bridekirk	W.Skinner	London transport	LR
1784	W.Bridekirk	W.Skinner	London transport London–Petersburg	LR
1789	W.Bridekirk	W.Skinner; W.Sims	London–Baltic	LR
1790	W.Bridekirk	W.Skinner; St.Barbe	London–Baltic	LR; damage repaired 1789
1791	W.Bridekirk	W.Skinner	Cork transport	LR; damage repaired 1789
1792	W.Bridekirk	W.Skinner	London–Petersburg	LR; damage repaired 1789
1793	W.Bridekirk	W.Skinner	London–Petersburg; Cork transport	LR; damage repaired 1789
1797	W.Bridekirk	W.Skinner	Cork transport London–Riga	LR; damage repaired 1789 & repairs 1797
1799	W.Bridekirk	W.Skinner	Riga–Portsmouth; London transport	LR; damage repaired 1789 & repairs 1797
1800	W.Bridekirk	W.Skinner	London transport Liverpool–Rostock	LR; damage repaired 1789 & repairs 1797
1805	W.Bridekirk	Skinner, Jr.	Cork	LR; damage repaired 1789 & repairs 1797

LR carried William and Ann until 1810 with data unchanged from the 1805 volume. However, William and Ann had become a whaler, something that the Register of Shipping (RS) had recorded.

Year	Master	Owner	Trade	Source & notes
1806	Johnson	Skinner	Whitby–Davis Strait	RS; repairs 1797, good repairs 1802, and small repairs 1804 and 1805

Some data exists on William and Ann's catches in the Northern Whale Fishery.

Year	Master	Where	"Fish" (Whales)	Tuns blubber	Tuns whale oil	Seals
1805	Johnston	Davis Strait	8	111		0
1806			7	141		11
1807	Johnston	Davis Strait	6	100.75		0
1808			25	313.5		1

In 1809 William and Ann traded between London and Whitby rather than engaging in whaling.

Year	Master	Owner	Trade	Source & notes
1810	Stephens	Skinner	Whitby–London	RS; good repairs 1802, 1804, 1805, 1806, 1807, & 1888

Year	Master	Where	"Fish" (Whales)	Tuns blubber	Tuns whale oil	Seals
1810	Stephens	Greenland	11	184.5		42
1811			19	192		122

On 27 February 1812, William and Ann, Davidson, master, was leaving Leith for Davis Strait when she grounded at the end of the pier.

Year	Master	Where	"Fish" (Whales)	Tuns blubber	Tuns whale oil	Seals
1812			16	221		166
1813			9	139.5		0
1814	Stephenson	Greenland	31 or 32	250	180 or 190	157
1815	Stephenson	Greenland	4	91	67	171
1816	Stephenson	Greenland	3	68	49	22
1817	Stephens	Greenland	22		200	1535
1818	Stephens	Greenland	8	115	89	1
1819	Terry	Greenland	1		14	
1820	Terry	Greenland	12	189.5	136	7
1821	Terry	Greenland	9		72	
1822	Terry		6		81	
1823	Terry		25		204	
1824	Terry		13		150	
1825	Terry		3		46	
1826	Terry				23	
1827	Terry		6		70	
1828	Terry		13		149	
1829	Terry		10		115	

== Fate ==
The 1830 season was a disastrous one for the Northern Whale Fishery. Seven Scottish and five English ships were lost between 10 June and 10 September when beset by ice. William and Ann, of Whitby, Terry, master, was one of the vessels lost. She was one of the vessels that ice crushed on 26 June.

Captain Terry transferred to Eagle, along with the carpenter and 12 seamen.
