= French ship Pluton (1778) =

Ship of the line of the French Navy

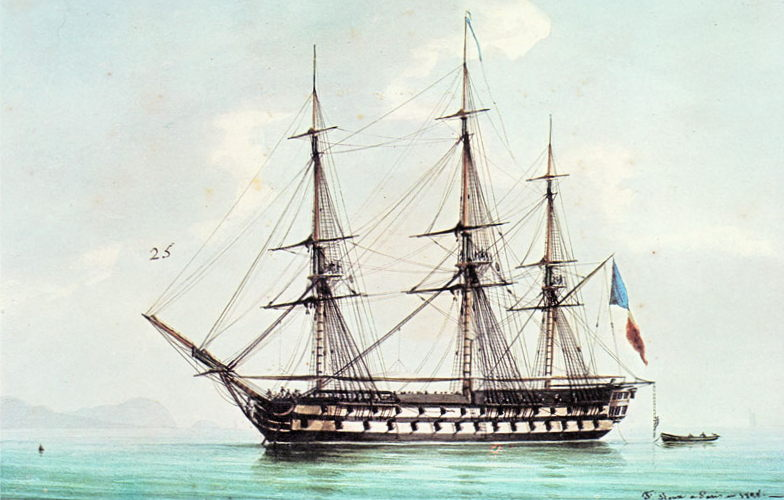
- Illustration of Pluton

History

France
- Name: Pluton
- Launched: 5 November 1778
- Commissioned: 1778
- Decommissioned: 1805
- Honours and awards: Participated in: Battle of Martinique (1780); Battle of Fort Royal (1781); Battle of Chesapeake (1781); Battle of Saint Kitts (1782); Battle of the Saintes (1782)
- Fate: Broken up
- Notes: Renamed Dugommier (1797)

General characteristics
- Class & type: Scipion class
- Displacement: 2,943 tonneaux
- Tons burthen: 1,424 port tonneaux
- Length: 53.8 m (176 ft 6 in)
- Beam: 14.1 m (46 ft 3 in)
- Draught: 7.3 m (24 ft)
- Propulsion: Sails
- Armament: 74 to 78 guns of various weights of shot

Pluton was a 74-gun Scipion-class ship of the line of the French Navy launched at Rochefort in 1778. Pluton took part in the Battle of Martinique on 17 April 1780 under Ship-of-the-line Captain Joseph Léon de La Marthonie. Ship-of-the-line Captain François Hector d'Albert de Rions captained her at the Battle of Martinique on 29 April 1781, at the Battle of the Chesapeake on 5 September 1781, at the Battle of Saint Kitts on 24–25 January 1782, and at the Battle of the Saintes on 12 April 1782. Pluton participated in French expedition to Ireland in December 1796 under Ship-of-the-line Captain Jean-Marie Lebrun. She was renamed Dugommier in 1797 and seems to have seen little further active service before being broken up in 1805.
