= Argonaute-class ship of the line =

Class overview
- Name: Argonaute
- Operators: French Navy
- Preceded by: Scipion class
- Completed: 2

General characteristics
- Class & type: Argonaute class
- Displacement: 2,943 tonneaux
- Tons burthen: 1,424 port tonneaux
- Length: 55.22 m (181 ft 2 in)
- Beam: 14.29 m (46 ft 11 in)
- Draught: 7.39 m (24 ft 3 in)
- Propulsion: Sails
- Armament: 74 guns comprising: Lower deck ("1st tier") 28 × 36-pounder long guns; Upper deck ("2nd tier") 30 × 18-pounder long guns; Gaillards ("3rd tier") 16 × 8-pounder long guns

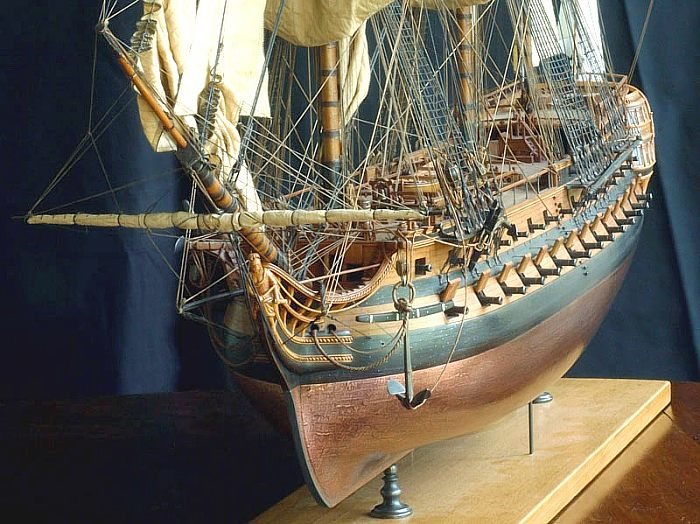
Modern miniature of a 74-gun ship.

The Argonaute class was a class of two 74-gun ships of the French Navy, built to a common design by naval constructor François-Guillaume Clairin-Deslauriers. The design was lengthened by 4feet 9½ inches (4½ pieds) from the designer's previous Scipion class, which had been found to lack stability. The designer died on 10 October 1780, and the construction of these ships was completed by Jean-Denis Chevillard, who was appointed his successor as ingénieur-constructeur en chef at that dockyard in July 1781.

== Ships ==
- Argonaute

Builder: Rochefort Dockyard
Ordered: June 1779
Begun: August 1779
Launched: 5 June 1781
Completed: December 1781
Fate: Cut down (raséed) to a 'heavy' frigate 1793-94 and renamed Flibustier; disarmed in December 1795 and later taken to pieces.

- Brave

Builder: Lorient Dockyard
Ordered: June 1779
Begun: October 1779
Launched: 6 June 1781
Completed: November 1781
Fate: Cut down (raséed) to a 'heavy' frigate 1793-94 (but not renamed); reduced to a hulk at Brest in January 1798, and later taken to pieces.

== Notes and references ==
=== Bibliography ===
- Roche, Jean-Michel (2005). Dictionnaire des bâtiments de la flotte de guerre française de Colbert à nos jours. Vol. 1. Group Retozel-Maury Millau. p. 508. ISBN 978-2-9525917-0-6. OCLC 165892922.
- Winfield, Rif and Roberts, Stephen S. (2017) French Warships in the Age of Sail 1626–1786: Design, Construction, Careers and Fates. Seaforth Publishing. ISBN 978-1-4738-9351-1.
- Winfield, Rif and Roberts, Stephen S. (2015) French Warships in the Age of Sail 1786-1861: Design, Construction, Careers and Fates. Seaforth Publishing. ISBN 978-1-84832-204-2.
