= Haasje (1788 ship) =

History

Dutch East India Company Dutch Republic & Batavian Republic
- Name: Haasje (or Haas, or Haase)
- Namesake: The leveret, i.e., the young of the hare
- Operator: Amsterdam Chamber of the Dutch East India Company
- Builder: Amsterdam
- Launched: 1788
- Captured: 1797

Great Britain
- Name: Hare
- Owner: Robinson
- Acquired: c.1798 by purchase of a prize
- Fate: Last listed in 1806

General characteristics
- Tons burthen: Dutch: 136; English:160, or 180, or 230 (bm)
- Length: 68 voet (Note: The measurement is in Amsterdam feet (voet) of 11 Amsterdam inches (duim) (see Dutch units of measurement). The Amsterdam foot is about 8% shorter than an English foot.)
- Sail plan: Brig
- Complement: VOC:24-25; At capture:44, or 45
- Armament: 6 × 3-pounder guns

Haasje (or Haas) was built at Amsterdam in 1788 as a packet for the Dutch East India Company (VOC). She made three or probably four voyages between Texel and Batavia. A British whaler captured her in August 1797 as she was on a secret mission from Batavia to arm Dutch farmers in the Cape Colony to stir up difficulties for the British. She sailed to Britain and a French privateer captured her shortly before she arrived. She was quickly recaptured. She became a merchantman sailing between London and Dartmouth, and then London and Africa. She was last listed in 1806.

== VOC voyages ==
Voyage #1: Captain Jan Andries Rugee sailed from the Texel on 18 November 1789, bound for Batavia. Haasje reached the Cape of Good Hope on 6 February 1790, and left on the 17th. She arrived at Batavia on 22 April.

Homeward bound, Captain Rugee sailed from Batavia on 18 May. Between Batavia and the Cape slaves aboard Haasje revolted and killed Jan Andries Rugee and two other members. The rest of the crew shot the ringleaders and put down the revolt. Jan Wilting became master until she reached the Cape on 28 July. There Francois Johan van den Broek was appointed master. Haasje left the Cape on 23 August and arrived at Texel on 1 December.

Voyage #2: Captain Jacom Zoetman sailed from Texel on 9 July 1791, bound for Batavia. Haasjereached the Cape on 16 September and left on 30 October. She arrived at Batavia on 15 December.

Homeward bound, Captain Ditmar Smit (or Zoetman), sailed from Batavia on 28 January 1792. Haasje reached the Cape on 29 March and left on 11 April. She arrived back at the Texel on 28 June.

Voyage #3: Captain Arie Smitskamp sailed from Texel on 20 September 1793, bound for Batavia. However he put into Plymouth on the 28th and Haasje did not proceed on her voyage until 24 November. She arrived at the Cape on 6 March 1794 and left on the 16th. She arrived at Batavia on 15 June 1794. Unfortunately, the database of VOC voyages does not carry any more of her voyages.

== Capture ==
The VOC fitted out Haasje at Batavia on 15 February 1797 to carry a cargo to Algoa Bay for the Dutch farmers at Graaff-Reinet. The cargo consisted of eight field guns, 600 barrels of gunpowder, each of 60 pounds, 50 bales of cotton cloth, and provisions, rice, beef, pork, sugar, and coffee, all for the farmers to use to mount an insurrection against the British at Cape Colony. (Note: The cannons were variously described as 9 and 12-pounders, or four 8 and four 12-pounders.) She had a crew of 20 Europeans and 24 Malays, all under the command of Captain Jan de Freyn. (Note: Jan, Ja Jacob, or Joh. de Freyn (or de frein) was described as a mulatto, the natural son of a senior Dutch officer.)

On 3 May Haasje, which had been severely damaged during a storm, anchored in Delagoa Bay at the mouth of the Delagoa River to repair. She was captured there on 27 May by an English whaler, assisted by a Portuguese ship.

At Delagoa Bay De Freyn found a whaler flying an American flag. She was Hope, actually a British vessel. De Freyn became friendly with Hope's officers and confided to them that he planned to make contact with the farmers of Graaff-Reinet, but if he could not, he would sail to Algoa Bay and try there. Hope's officers wanted to capture Haatsje, but Hope had only two 3-pounder guns and a crew of 24 men. They were thus unable to do anything when Haasje sailed further up the river.

However, two French frigates had destroyed the Portuguese fort at Lourenco Marques in October 1796, forcing its commander and 80 men to take refuge in the back country while they waited for a Portuguese vessel to come and get them. A few days after Haasje sailed up the river, a Portuguese vessel did arrive. The British were able to convince the Portuguese to contribute some men and cannons to an expedition to capture Haatje. (Note: The exact number of cannons and men varies by account. An English account states that the Portuguese contributed four cannons and ten men. De Freyn claimed that the Portuguese provided 50 men under an officer and 10 field guns.)

Hope proceeded up the river towards Haasje. On 28 May the Anglo-Portuguese force attacked the Dutch force, which had set up a battery on land, and which had the assistance of a local chief and his men. eventually the Anglo-Portuguese force prevailed and captured two field guns and 22,800 pounds of gunpowder. The local natives plundered the rest of Haasje's cargo while the skirmish was going on.

De Freyn had scuttled Haasje but the British were able to refloat her. Hope's chief officer, Alexander Dixon, took four men as a prize crew and sailed Haasje to Simon's Bay, where they arrived on 11 August. De Freyn boarded some of the whalers at Lourenco Marques, some signing on as crew and some simply passengers, and reached Table Bay.

One of the whalers at Delagoa Bay, Fonthill, carried de Freyn to the Cape of Good Hope. She arrived there on 12 October 1797. When De Freyn arrived at Table Bay he protested the seizure of his vessel by a vessel not possessing a letter of marque and occurring in a neutral port.

Fonthill sailed two days later with de Freyn a prisoner. Governor Macartney, of the Cape Colony, sent him back to be detained in England for as long as possible. Macartney wrote to War Secretary Henry Dundas, advising him that the British government should delay releasing or exchanging de Freyn as he was a "very shrewd and dangerous fellow". Fonthill arrived back at London on 19 December 1797.

== British merchantman ==
Hare, Buncher, master, was sailing from the Cape when a French privateer captured her in May 1798. The lugger Weymouth, of Jersey, recaptured Hare, which then arrived at Dartmouth. (Note: Weymouth, of 45 tons (bm), had a crew of 50 men under the command of Thomas Wooldridge, who had acquired a letter of marque on 29 January 1798. She carried eight 2-pounder guns.)

Hare, of 180 tons (bm) and Dutch origin, appeared in Lloyd's Register (LR) in 1798 with Muncheson, master, Robinson, owner, and trade Dartmouth–London. She had undergone a thorough repair in 1798.

Year	Master	Owner	Trade	Source
1801	J. Steward	Henderson	London–Africa	Register of Shipping (RS)
1806	J. Steward	Henderson	London–Africa	RS

== Post-script ==
Hope did not possess a letter of marque, and so the capture of Haase was by a non-commissioned vessel. Hence the prize became a Droits of Admiralty. The High Court of Admiralty ruled on 4 April 1799 that as Hope had faced resistance and that the capture had cost her the chief part of her voyage, the captors could retain the entire value of the prize (£2,900), with one-third to go to the owners and two-thirds to the master and crew. The money to captain and crew was to be divided according to the usual practices for private ships of war.
