= Pierre Servan René Bouvet de Maisonneuve =

- Born: 10 April 1750; Saint-Servan, France
- Died: 25 May 1795 (aged 45); Paris, France
- Relatives: Pierre François Étienne Bouvet de Maisonneuve
- Military career
- Branch: French Navy
- Rank: captain
- Conflicts: action of 17 June 1778; Battle of Porto Praya; Battle of Sadras; Battle of Providien; Battle of Trincomalee

Pierre Servan René Bouvet de Maisonneuve (French pronunciation: [pjɛʁ sɛʁvɑ̃ ʁəne buvɛ də mɛzɔ̃nœv]; Saint-Servan, 10 April 1750 — Paris, 25 May 1795) was a French naval officer. He served in several notable battles, notably the action of 17 June 1778, and the battles conducted by Suffren in the Indian Ocean. He was wounded at the Battle of Porto Praya. He was the father of Pierre François Étienne Bouvet de Maisonneuve.

== Biography ==
Bouvet de Maisonneuve was born to the family of a naval engineer, originating from Brittany, whose lineage goes back to Charles Bouvet, tax prosecutor, born in 1555. He was a son of Pierre Louis Bouvet de Maisonneuve and of his wife, Madeleine Lefeuvre. He joined the merchant navy at a young age and rose to sea captain.

=== Service on Belle Poule ===
In 1778, in a context of increasing tensions between France and Britain due to the War of American Independence, Bouvet was recalled to serve in the French Royal Navy as an auxiliary Frigate Lieutenant, and appointed to the frigate Belle Poule, upon request of her commanding officer, Chadeau de la Clocheterie. Bouvet took part in the Action of 17 June 1778 with the role of maneuver officer. In the opening of the action, he commanded the maneuver that freed Belle Poule from HMS Arethusa and prompted the British to open fire. During the battle, a piece of splinter ripped away part of his thigh, but he refuse to be carried below.

In recognition of his behaviour in the action, Bouvet earned a full commission of Frigate Lieutenant. He was then promoted to capitaine de brûlot (Note: A rank equivalent to Lieutenant.), and appointed to the 64-gun Sphinx as first officer, under Captain du Chillau. (Note: also written "Duchillau".)

=== Indian Ocean campaign under Suffren ===
Sphinx was part of a squadron under Captain Suffren, tasked to reinforce the Dutch Cape Colony against a foreseen British invasion after the outbreak of the Fourth Anglo-Dutch War in 1780. The squadron also comprised 74-guns Héros (under Suffren himself) and Annibal (under Trémignon), and the 64-guns Artésien (under Cardaillac and Vengeur (under Forbin), as well as the 16-gun corvette Fortune (under Captain de Lusignan), and seven transports carrying the Régiment de Pondichéry, under Brigadier General Thomas Conway. The squadron departed Brest on 22 March 1781.

Bouvet took part in the Battle of Porto Praya on 16 April 1781, where he directed maneuver when Sphinx took Annibal in tow after she lost her rigging in the action. He then took part in the Battle of Sadras on 17 February 1782, and the Battle of Providien on 12 April 1782.

On 3 September 1782, in the late stage of the Battle of Trincomalee, as Suffren's flagship Héros was isolated, Bouvet broke discipline and took upon himself to move Sphinx next to Héros to support her, although Chillau approved retroactively. After the battle, Sphinx took Héros in tow, bringing her to the safety of Trincomalee harbour where they arrived in the evening of 7 September 1782.

A few days after the battle, Suffren summoned Bouvet and after chastising him for his breach of protocol, he congratulated him for his maneuver and promoted him to the command of the 18-gun corvette Fortune. He furthermore recommended him for the Cross of the Order of Saint Louis, and presented him with a pair of luxurious British-made pistols that Hughes had gifted him. (Note: The pistols later went to his son Pierre Bouvet.)

Bouvet took part in the rest of the campaign in the Indian Ocean under Suffren. On 13 April 1783, Suffren sent Fortune to carry despatches back to France. He sailed to the Cape of Good Hope before continuing to Europe. In late April, Fortune encountered a British corvette, which sent a boat bringing the news of the Peace of Paris.

=== Revolutionary wars ===
Bouvet arrived in Lorient on 24 August 1783, and rode to Versailles with Suffren's despatches. Bouvet was promoted to Lieutenant, and made a Knight in the Order of Saint Louis.

In 1786, Bouvet captained the fluyt Nécessaire to India. (Note: Cunat calls Nécessaire a 64-gun ship of the line, armed en flûte.) His 12-year-old son Pierre François Étienne Bouvet de Maisonneuve came along as an apprentice. When Nécessaire returned to France in 1789, the Revolution had broken out. Bouvet sympathised with its cause, and became one of the few officers of the Royal Navy to hold their commission through the Revolution.

In 1792, he was promoted to captain and appointed to command the frigate Aréthuse The year after, Bouvet served as a Commodore, with his flag on the 74-gun Patriote, and commanded a division also comprising Entreprenant, Orion and Apollon, in Trogoff's fleet. During the Siege of Toulon in August 1793, after a royalist plot surrendered the city to the British, Bouvet threatened to fight and negotiated safe passage for his four ships. Two sailed to Rochefort, and he sailed to Brest with the two others, where he arrived on 13 October 1793.

Bouvet was warmly received by Jeanbon Saint-André, but a few days later he was incarcerated. He was released after the Thermidorian Reaction put an end to the Reign of Terror.

On 25 May 1795, after a heated exchanged with Navy minister Jean Dalbarade, Bouvet fell acutely ill and died. (Note: Levot gives 25 March as Bouvet's date of death.)
