= Paul de Cardaillac de Lomné =

Naval officer

Paul de Cardaillac de Lomné (Casties-la-Brande, 9 October 1739 — Artésien, 16 April 1781) was a French Navy officer.

== Biography ==
In May 1778, Cardaillac served with Charles Picot de Dampierre during the War of American Independence.

With the outbreak of the Fourth Anglo-Dutch War, France and the Dutch Republic found themselves allied against the Kingdom of Great Britain. The Dutch expected the British to send an expeditionary force to try and capture their Dutch Cape Colony, and Suffren was given command of a 5-ship squadron to reinforce it. The task force comprised the 74-gun Héros (under Suffren) and Annibal (under Trémignon), and the 64-gun Artésien (under Cardaillac), Sphinx (under Du Chilleau) and Vengeur (under Forbin), as well as the 16-gun corvette Fortune (under Captain de Lusignan), and seven transports carrying the Régiment de Pondichéry, under Brigadier General Thomas Conway.

Cardaillac was killed during the Battle of Porto Praya by a bullet to the chest.

Lieutenant de la Bossière took over command of Artésien.
