= Sphinx (disambiguation) =

A sphinx is a mythical creature with the head of a human and the body of a lion.

Sphinx or Sphynx may also refer to:

== In Egypt ==
- Great Sphinx of Giza, the giant Sphinx statue near the Great Pyramids
- Sphinx of Memphis, a stone sphinx located near the ruins of Memphis
- Sphinx International Airport, a public airport serving the city of Giza

== Geographic features ==
=== Antarctica ===
- Mount Sphinx, in the Prince de Ligne Mountains, Queen Maud Land
- Sphinx Hill, King George Island, South Shetland Islands
- Sphinx Island, Graham Land
- Sphinx Mountain, in the Wohlthat Mountains, Queen Maud Land
- Sphinx Peak, Victoria Land

=== Canada ===
- The Sphinx (British Columbia), a mountain in British Columbia
- Sphinx Dome, a lava dome in British Columbia

=== Europe ===
- Sphinx (Romania), a natural rock formation in the Carpathian Mountains
- Sphinx (Scotland), meteorological feature in the Cairngorms
- Sphinx, a Turkish rock outcrop in ANZAC Cove

=== United States ===
- The Sphinx (Kings Canyon National Park), in California
- The Sphinx (Wyoming), a mountain in the Wind River Range
- Sphinx Mountain (Madison County, Montana)

== Arts and entertainment ==
=== Fictional entities ===
- Sphinx (Marvel Comics), two Marvel Comics characters
- S.P.H.I.N.X., an organization in The Venture Bros.
- The Sphinx, a character in the 1999 film Mystery Men
- Sphinx, a character in the TV series Mahō Sentai Magiranger

=== Film and television ===
- The Sphinx (1916 film), an American lost silent film
- The Sphinx (1920 film), an Italian silent film
- The Sphinx (1933 film), an American film directed by Phil Rosen
- Sphinx (film), a 1981 American film adaptation of Robin Cook's novel (see below)
- "Sphinx" (Space Ghost Coast to Coast), a television episode
- "The Sphinx" (Extreme Ghostbusters), a television episode

=== Literature and periodicals ===
- Sphinx (novel), a 1979 novel by Robin Cook
- The Sphinx (Aeschylus), a fragmentary satyr play in the Seven Against Thebes trilogy
- The Sphinx (magazine), a 1902–1953 magazine for magicians
- The Sphinx (poem), an 1894 poem by Oscar Wilde
- "The Sphinx", an 1846 short story by Edgar Allan Poe
- The Sphinx, a journal of Alpha Phi Alpha

=== Music ===
- Sphynx (band), a 1990s American dance music act
- The Sphinx (album), a 2011 album, or the title song, by Sananda Maitreya (Terence Trent D'Arby)
- The Sphinx – Das Beste aus den Jahren 1976–1983, a 2006 album by Amanda Lear
- Sphynx (album), a 2003 album by Melechesh
- "The Sphinx" (song), a 1978 song by Amanda Lear
- Sphinx, a song by Gojira from their 2021 album Fortitude
- Sphinx (album), an album by the Allegro Jazz Ensemble

=== Other media ===
- Sphinx (Marc Quinn sculpture), a 2006 sculpture of Kate Moss
- Sphinx, a 1984 role-playing game
- Sphinx and the Cursed Mummy, a 2003 action-adventure video game
- The Sphinx, a 2013 sculpture produced by Banksy during the Better Out Than In residency in New York City

== Organisations ==
- Sphinx (senior society), a secret society at Dartmouth College
- Sphinx Senior Society, a senior society at the University of Pennsylvania
- Sphinx Organization, aiding the development of young Black and Latino classical musicians
- Sphinx Resources, a Canadian mining company
- Sphinx Systems, a Swiss firearms manufacturer

== Science and technology ==
- Sphinx (gene), a non-coding RNA in Drosophila
- Sphinx (moth), the common name of many moths in the family Sphingidae
  - Sphinx (genus), a genus of moths in the family Sphingidae
- Sphinx (satellite), an American test satellite
- Sphynx cat, a breed of hairless cat
- Sphinx tiling, a geometric tiling using the "sphinx" hexiamond

=== Computing ===
- Sphinx (documentation generator), a free, open-source, extensible documentation generator
- Sphinx (home automation system), a conceptual home environment designed in the Soviet Union in 1987
- Sphinx (search engine), an SQL full-text search engine
- CMU Sphinx, a free voice recognition engine from Carnegie Mellon University
- Sphinx, codename for Microsoft SQL Server 7.0; see History of Microsoft SQL Server

== Transport ==
- CSS Sphynx, later the Japanese ironclad Kōtetsu, a 19th-century warship
- HMS Sphinx, several ships of the Royal Navy
- French ship Sphinx, several ships of the French Navy
- La Mouette Sphinx, a French hang glider design

== Other uses ==
- Le Sphinx, a Paris brothel founded in 1931
- Sphinx Ting, Taiwanese actor and model
- Sphinx, a typeface produced by Deberny & Peignot
- Sphinx, a disc golf fairway driver by Infinite Discs
- The Sphinx, nicknames of a prominent German general and military reformers, Hans von Seeckt
- Sphinx, a nickname for Franklin D. Roosevelt, the 32nd president of United States
- Sphinx Observatory at the Jungfraujoch glacier saddle in Switzerland

== See also ==
- Sfinks (disambiguation)
- Sfinx (disambiguation)
- SPHINCS
- SPHINCS+
