= Jean-Paul de Ruyter-Werfusé =

French naval officer of the War of American Independence

Jean-Paul de Ruyter-Werfusé (Toulon, 1748 — 1810) was a French Navy officer. He notably captained the 40-gun frigate Pourvoyeuse and the 50-gun Petit Annibal in Suffren's squadron during the Anglo-French War.

== Biography ==
Ruyter joined the Navy as a Garde-Marine on 12 November 1764. He was promoted to Lieutenant on 14 February in 1778.

In 1778, Ruyter was third Lieutenant on the 64-gun Fantasque, under Captain Suffren. Fantasque was part of the squadron under Admiral d'Estaing supporting the rebels in the War of American Independence. In 1780, Ruyter was captain of the 18-gun corvette Flèche, in Toulon. He cruised on the coast of Italy. Ruyter departed Brest on 22 March 1781, as first officer of the 74-gun Héros, flagship of a division under Captain Suffren bound for the Dutch Cape Colony and from there to Isle de France (Mauritius). He took part in the Battle of Porto Praya, where his conduct earned him the Cross of the Order of Saint Louis.

On 23 January 1782, Suffren gave him command of the recently captured 50-gun Petit Annibal. On 13 February, he exchanged his command with that of Morard de Galles and transferred on the 40-gun frigate Pourvoyeuse. In the run-up to the Battle of Sadras, tasked with escorting a convoy, Ruyter failed to maintain formation and, when the British attacked it, to come to its rescue. Ruyter lost contact with Suffren's squadron and returned to Puducherry, which had been chosen as a rendez-vous point in case ships got separated.

Suffren dismissed him on 20 March, giving command of Pourvoyeuse to Lanuguy-Tromelin. Ruyter was retired from the Navy on 25 July 1784.
