= HMS Fortune (1778) =

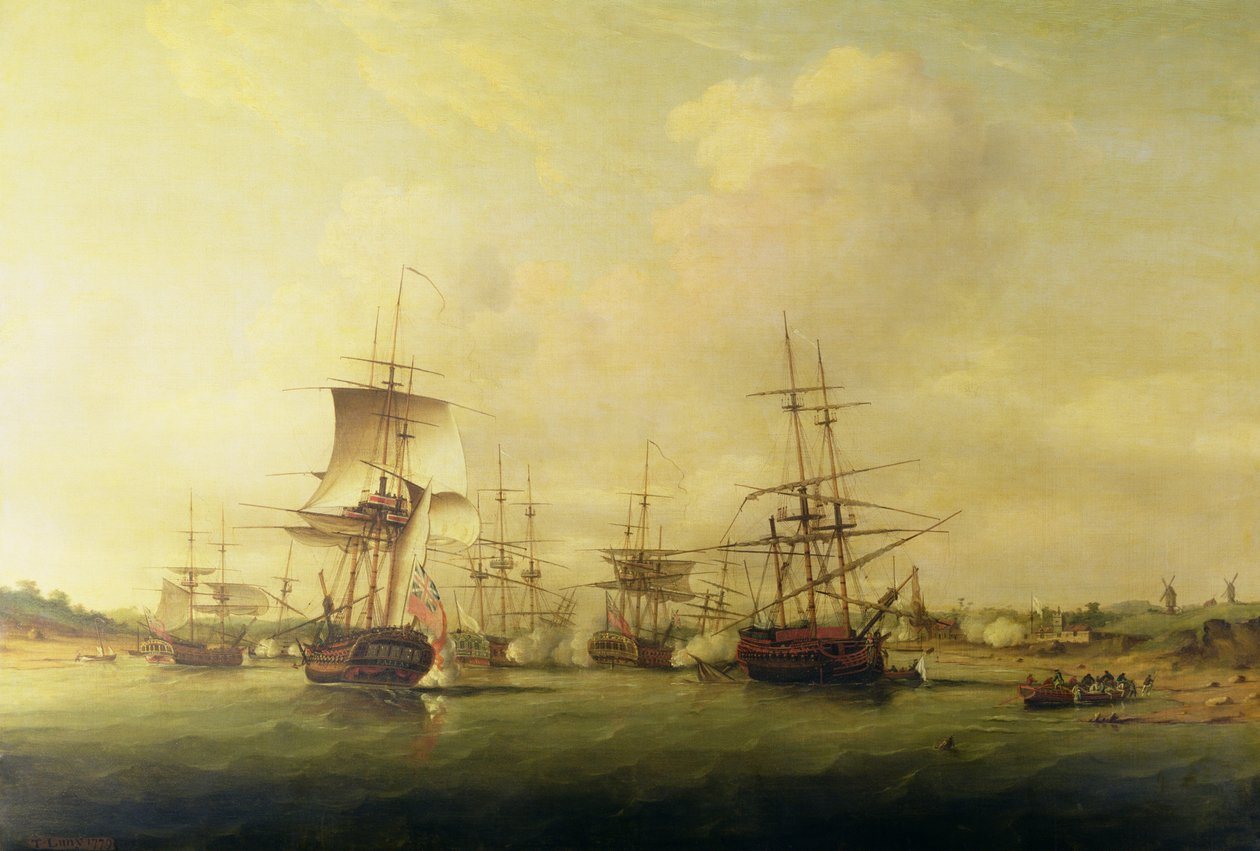
HMS Fortune in an action against the French at Cancale Bay on 13 May 1779

HMS Fortune was a British 14-gun sloop launched in 1778 that the French captured in April 1780. She then served with the French navy under the same name.

== British service ==
Commander Charles Powell Hamilton commissioned Fortune in June 1778 for the Channel.

Invasion of Jersey: In late April 1779 a small French squadron carrying troops sailed from Saint-Malo to land at St Ouen's Bay on Jersey. They arrived off shore on 1 May. The British moved guns and troops and guns to oppose the landing. The French armed vessels were unable to get close enough to shore to provide supporting fire so the troop transports did not attempt to land their troops. The French sailed away. The French sailed from Saint-Malo on 13 May and immediately encountered a British naval relief squadron, that included Fortune, that belatedly come up. The British succeeded in chasing the French into Cancale Bay, where the British captured the French frigate Danae, and a brig and cutter. They also set fire to three French vessels.

Commander Powell was promoted to post captain on 18 May 1779. Commander Matthew Squire replaced Hamilton.

On 19 May, a small sloop that Fortune had captured at Cancale Bay arrived at Portsmouth. The sloop was carrying lead, tin, and linseed.

On 19 October Fortune returned to Portsmouth from Mogadore.

In November 1779 Fortune was under the command of Commander Lewis Robertson. He sailed for the Leeward Islands on 19 January 1780.

Capture: On 26 April the two French frigates Gentille (40 guns) and Iphigénie (34 guns) captured Fortune off Barbuda. The frigates belonged to Guichen’s squadron. Fortune had sighted some vessels and approached cautiously. When she made signals that the unknown vessels did not return, and when Robertson could not understand their signals, he guessed that the vessels were French and he attempted to sail away. Two frigates left the French squadron to pursue Fortune. Fortune initially outpaced her pursuers until the winds weakened and the pursuers were able to catch up. Gentille fired sporadically until Iphigénie also came up. At that point Robertson struck.

== French service ==
The beginning of the Fourth Anglo-Dutch War in 1780 effectively put the Dutch Republic on the French side of the Anglo-French War and the War of American Independence. The Dutch expected a British invasion of their Dutch Cape Colony, and France assembled a 5-ship squadron under Suffren to reinforce it. The task force comprised the 74-gun Héros (under Suffren himself) and Annibal (under Trémignon), and the 64-gun Artésien (under Cardaillac), Sphinx (under du Chilleau) and Vengeur (under Forbin), as well as the 16-gun corvette Fortune (under Lieutenant Lusignan), and seven transports carrying the Régiment de Pondichéry, under Brigadier General Thomas Conway. The squadron departed Brest on 22 March 1781. Fortune and Annibal were the only two ships in the squadron not to have a copper sheathing.

She took part in the Battle of Porto Praya, where she captured the fireship HMS Infernal; Suffren then ordered Lusignan to bring orders to the French transports, and he abandoned Infernal after taking her captain and 15 men prisoners. Infernal returned to Porto Praya harbour.

On 21 August 1782, Ilustre and Saint-Michel arrived at Batacalo, making their junction with the squadron under Suffren. They were escorting 8 transports and preceded by the corvette Fortune, under Lusignan.

On 20 August 1782, Lusignan was at the vanguard of the French squadron when it departed Batacalo for the Battle of Trincomalee. After the Battle, in early September 1782, Suffren promoted Bouvet de Maisonneuve to the command of Fortune. In April 1783, after the Peace of Paris brought about a cease-fire between the French and the British, Suffren sent Fortune back to France to report on his situation.

In October 1783 she became a packet ship under the name Courrier de Lorient (and later Courrier de Lorient No.3), serving out of Lorient on the line Lorient-New York. In January 1787 she was transferred to the Régie des Paquebots, for whom she served on the Havre-New York line. She was put up for sale at Havre in December 1788 and sold in January 1789 to Mr. Ruellan.
