= French ship Héros (1778) =

French 74-gun ship of the line

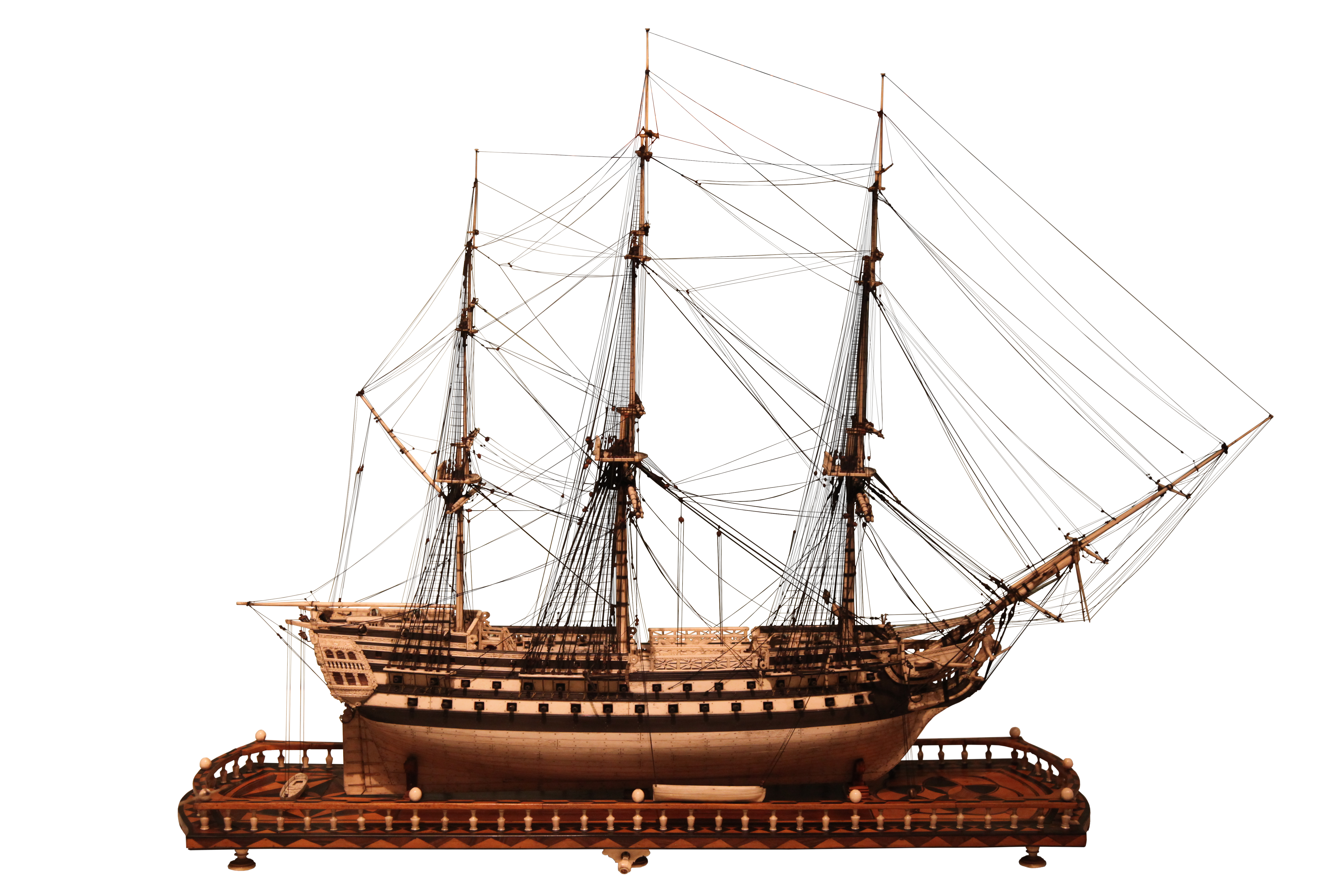
- Model of Héros, currently on display at the Museum of Fine Arts, Boston that a French prisoner of war from Dieppe made in England circa 1781

History

France
- Builder: Toulon arsenal
- Laid down: 1778
- Launched: 30 December 1778
- Fate: Scuttled by fire on 18 December 1793

General characteristics
- Length: 168 ft (51 m)
- Beam: 43.5 ft (13.3 m)
- Draught: 21 ft (6.4 m)
- Propulsion: sail
- Armament: Lower battery: 28 × 36-pounder guns; Upper battery: 30 × 18-pounder guns; Castles: 16 × 8-pounder guns
- Armour: Timber

Héros was a 74-gun ship of the line of the French Navy, known mostly for being the flagship of Pierre André de Suffren de Saint Tropez during the Anglo-French War.

== Career ==
=== Construction ===
She was built in 1778 at Toulon on a design by Joseph-Marie-Blaise Coulomb.

=== Indian Ocean campaign under Suffren ===
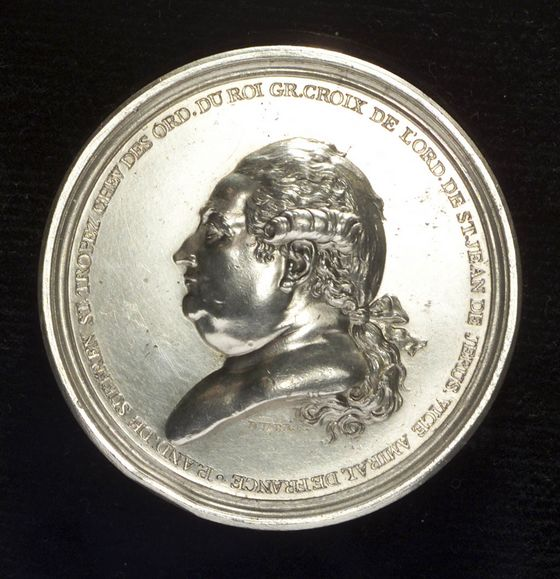
Héros was the flagship of admiral Suffren during his 1781–83 campaign in the Indian Ocean (National Maritime Museum).

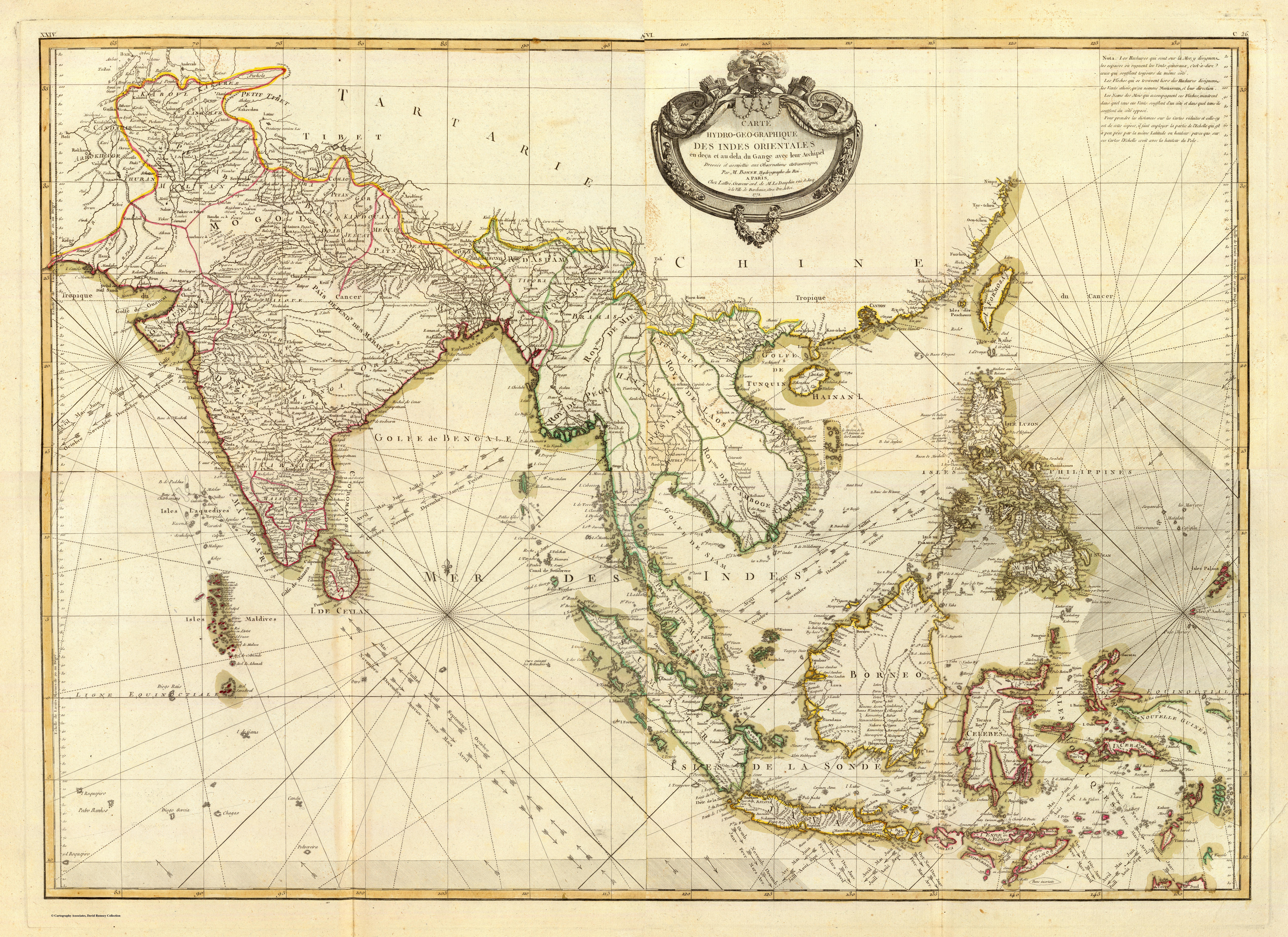
Les « Indes orientales ». Héros fought in five battles under Suffren.

In 1781 she became part of Suffren's force, consisting of the 16-gun corvette Fortune, five ships of the line, eight troopships and a thousand soldiers, all entrusted with carrying the French war effort into the Indian Ocean. The other warships were one other 74 gun ship (Annibal) and three 64-gun ships (Vengeur, Sphinx, and Artésien). Suffren had been allowed to choose his officers and non-commissioned officers and so these were mainly from Provence, despite the fact that the force set off from Brest. There were around ten men per gun, making a total crew of 712.

On 22 March 1781 the force sailed for the South Atlantic and on 16 April it met a force under commodore George Johnstone waiting off Cape Verde to attack the Cape. Suffren sailed Héros into the centre of the enemy formation to try to destroy it while it was still at anchor, in what became the battle of Porto Praya. Héros almost fought the battle alone as the other French ships were not so well commanded or manoeuvred and so engaged the enemy little or not at all. For more than an hour the Héros was under continual fire from the British ships – she fired "as fast as it was possible to load and reload" noted a British report of the battle. Annibal was completely dismasted and her captain was killed, leaving Héros to take her in tow after the battle.

Héros was stationed off the Cape from 21 June to 29 August to defend the Dutch colony from a British attack and to repair the damage done to her at Porto Praya. On 25 October she arrived at Île de France to join the French ships already stationed there – these were the ships of the line Orient (74 guns), Sévère (64), Bizarre (64), Ajax (64), Brillant (64), and Flamand (56), the frigates Pourvoyeuse (38), Fine (36), and Bellone (32), the corvettes Subtile (24), Sylphide (12), and Diligent (10), and the fireship Pulvérisateur (6 or 4 guns). With Héros as Suffren's flagship, the eleven ships left Île de France on 7 December 1781 to attack the British force in the Indian Ocean.

On 19 January, the 64-gun Sévère detected HMS Hannibal (50) a fourth rate ship of the line of the Royal Navy under Captain Alexander Christie. Héros and Artésien were dispatched to investigate. Closing with Hannibal, Sufferen made signals according to tables captured at Porto Praya from the East Indiaman Hinchinbrooke, until Hannibal made signals that he was unable to answer. A chase ensued, and with the night Suffren abandoned the pursuit to rejoin his fleet. On 21 January, the fleet once more encountered Hannibal. Héros, Artésien, and the 64-gun Vengeur were deployed but this time along with other ships as to ensure communication between the pursuers and the main body of the fleet, allowing Suffren to press on his chase. Suffren caught up with his quarry on 22 January at around noon. Héros was first of the three pursuing ships to come within range of Hannibal, and thus the first to bring her guns to bear on the English vessel. James Scurry, a 14 year old sailor of the Royal Navy was aboard Hannibal at the time of her capture. He went on to publish a memoir concerning his time as a prisoner. In the first chapter of his account, he discusses his ship's capture.

...when sufficiently near us, she [Héros] opened her fire, and continued it until the shot of two more line-of-battle ships [Artésien and Vengeur], one on our weather quarter, and the other on our bow, began to tell: resistance was now useless, and our captain very prudently struck his colours. The enemy instantly hoisted out his boats, boarded us, and separated our crew amongst his fleet.

— James Scurry, The captivity, sufferings and escape of James Scurry who was detained a prisoner during ten years in the dominations of Hyder Ali and Tippoo Saib, Chapter 1, Page 25-26

On 17 February 1782, under Suffren and Lieutenant de Moissac, his flag captain, Héros fought at the battle of Sadras off the coast of Coromandel, attacking the centre of the British formation and seriously damaging below the waterline Edward Hughes's flagship, the 74 gun HMS Superb. Héros and the rest of the squadron then called at Pondichéry and Porto-Novo to disembark general Duchemin's troops (21 February to 23 March 1782).

On 12 April Héros, still Suffren's flagship, fought in the bitter battle of Providien off Sri Lanka. She attacked HMS Superb again at pistol-shot range, causing a fire to break out aboard the British ship. She then de-masted HMS Monmouth, forcing her to leave the British line. However, Héros was also heavily damaged, losing the top of her foremast. This meant she was no longer maneuverable and so was forced to leave the battle, with Suffren switching his flag to the 64-gun Ajax mid-battle. Héros then stopped at Batticaloa on Ceylon with the rest of the squadron for repairs and to rest her crew.

On 6 July Héros fought in the battle of Negapatam. The wind suddenly changed direction mid-battle and broke up the two lines of battle, turning the engagement into a general mêlée. Héros saved the 64-gun Brillant, which had lost her mainmast. Héros then tried to engage HMS Superb, but the British refused to engage and the two squadrons disengaged for the third time after an indecisive battle. Héros called at Cuddalore on 8 July and she and the squadron were based there until 1 August. There Suffren met nabab Haidar Ali, who had come with his army to ally with Suffren against the British. The force then sailed again for Ceylon.

Héros and the squadron called at Batticaloa again from 9 to 23 August 1782 to be reinforced by the 74-gun Illustre and the 60-gun Saint-Michel, and seventeen transports with troops and supplies. Héros was also placed on her side at Batticaloa to repair her hull, caulking, and upperwork. Meanwhile, Suffren prepared an attempt to recapture Trincomalee, the main port on Ceylon. On 25 August, en route to Trincomalee, Héros had her stern and aftcastle lightly damaged in a collision with Artésien. She was still able to take part in the French landings on 26 August which ended in the surrender of the British garrison on 31 August and the port's recapture.

On 3 September 1782, in the battle of Trincomalee, Héros was again engaged against Hughes' squadron, which had come to the aid of Trincomalee. Héros, Illustre, and Ajax attacked the British centre but the wind dropped on part of the French line and the rest of the squadron was unable to follow – several captains only bombarded the British ships from a distance, contrary to Suffren's orders. A sketch by one of Suffren's officers shows Héros spending several hours at the height of the action in the crossfire of HMS Superb, HMS Monmouth (64 guns), HMS Burford (74 guns) and HMS Eagle (1774) (64 guns). Héros lost her mainmast and then her mizzenmast – the latter dragged the French flag into the water with it and for a moment the British thought that Suffren had struck his colours. Unengaged French ships of the line finally managed to tack into the battle and get Héros to safety. Suffren moved to Orient and Sphinx took Héros in tow. Héros stayed at Trincomalee for repairs until 1 October; she was repaired with matured timber and supplies taken from other ships of the line and transport ships.

Héros and the squadron sailed to Cuddalore in October to support the French garrison there, then under threat of siege. The squadron wintered, resupplied, and rested at Sumatra in November and December. On 12 November Héros became a floating embassy when Suffren received Alauddin Muhammad Syah, Sultan of Aceh, on board her. This was the first French squadron of such size to visit the region and – fearing it was an invasion – Syah wished to find out whether or not its intent was hostile towards him. On 8 January 1783, Héros returned to the Indian coast and took part in a deception that captured a British frigate. She then arrived in Cuddalore on 6 February.

From February to June 1783 Héros cruised between the Coromandel and Trincomalee coasts, with Suffren making Trincomalee his main base. She was present on 10 March when the squadron was reinforced by a large force under Bussy (consisting of the 74-gun Fendant and Argonaute, the 66-gun Hardi, and transports carrying 2,500 men). Suffren ordered this force to attack the British forces heading for Madras. Héros escorted the force before returning to Trincomalee and on 20 June she and the squadron fought the battle of Cuddalore. This was the final engagement between Hughes' and Suffren's squadrons – Suffren decided to give battle despite being outnumbered 18 to 15 in an attempt to lift the encirclement of Bussy's forces at Cuddalore. Héros took part in the battle, but orders received from the French king forced Suffren to lead the squadron from a frigate instead to avoid being wounded or captured – this directive had come into force after de Grasse's capture from the Ville de Paris at the battle of the Saintes on 12 April the previous year. Hughes's squadron was forced to flee, saving Bussy's force as Suffren had hoped. However, Suffren was unable to capitalize upon the victory as nine days later he received a dispatch reporting the signing of a preliminary peace agreement in Europe five months earlier that would become the Treaty of Paris.

Héros sailed back to France in triumph – she and Vengeur sailed on 6 October and arrived at Mauritius on 12 November, where its governor M. de Souillac came on board to salute Suffren. On 29 November, now accompanied by the frigate Cléopâtre, she sailed from the Cape, which she reached on 22 December. Nine British ships of the line were calling at the Cape at the same time – most of them had fought against Suffren but his renown was such that all the British officers came on board Héros "to salute in person a master of their profession, in a unique scene in French naval history. On 3 January 1784 Héros resumed her journey, reaching Toulon on 26 March to a rapturous reception and festivities at the city's hôtel de l’Intendance. On 6 April a local newspaper, the Courrier d'Avignon, reported a surprise dessert served to Suffren:

"It is written of this town [Toulon] that she presented to one diner a symbol, whose allegory was expressed with equal ingenuity and delicacy. As a dessert, it served a small sugar ship of the line modeled on the Héros, sailing the commander's flag; it was placed in a glass bowl below which was placed a laurel crown; at the poop of the ship was written the ship's name in large letters, Le Héros, and lower one read "At this table where everything flatters taste / With a shining circle around it, / This one must admire above all / It's Le Héros who virtue crowns"."

Impressed by the quality of Hindustani textile manufacture and hoping to set up a textile industry on Malta, Suffren had embarked fifty Indian cotton manufacturers on the Héros for the voyage home. They were immediately sent from Toulon to Malta to use its local cotton.

=== Evolution during the Indian Campaign ===
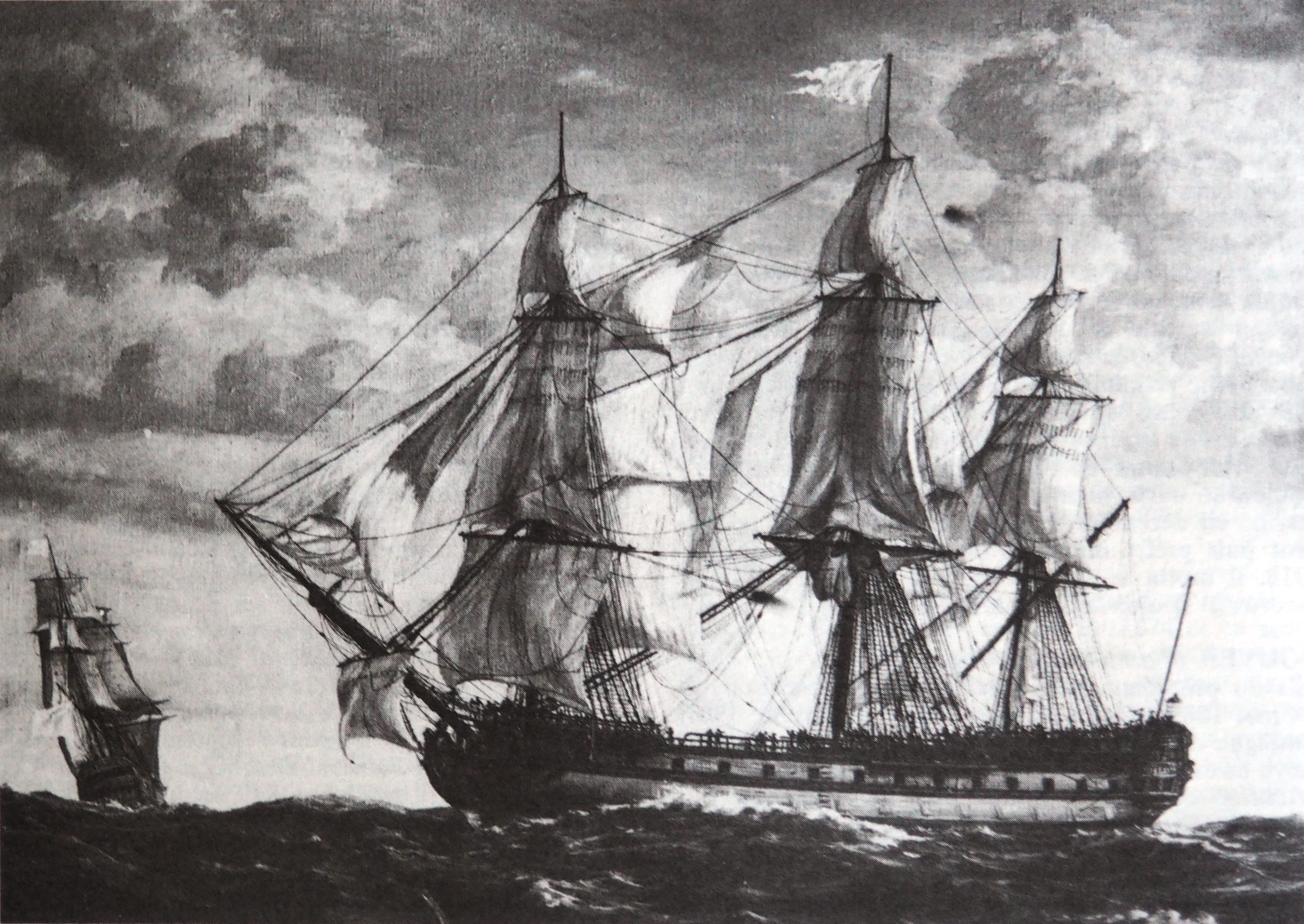
Painting of Héros, reproduced in the 1982 edition of Étienne Taillemite's Dictionnaire des Marins français.

Héros was on station for 27 months and then took 9 months to get back to France, meaning she was away from home waters for almost three years. This made her one of the most heavily engaged French warships of the time, though she was much-changed when she returned to Toulon – she had been dismasted twice (at Providien and Trincomalee) and repaired with modified rigging and masts from other ships and her launch had been so badly damaged by gunfire that Suffren suspended it from the stern at the level of the gallery.

The good health and discipline of the ship's crew (or at least those who remained on the flagship) is also instructive as to the kind of men being recruited in Brest in March 1781. However, it is difficult to trace changes in personnel over the course of the campaign – for example, the ship's muster does not take into account the presence of slaves, Lascars, and sepoys, who at times formed a considerable proportion of the crew. This was especially true during the final months in the Indian Ocean, when large numbers of the original crew had been killed in action or lost to sickness, wounds, or desertion. The Indian sailors' pay was different and records of their service are incomplete.

Of the 19 officers and gardes de la marine who left Brest with the ship in March 1781, only eight returned to Toulon aboard her – eight had left the ship during the campaign, two had been killed in combat, and one had died of his wounds. eighty-eight of the seamen were killed in battle. Of that 399, it is recorded that 41 died in hospital, though that is definitely an under-estimate. Forty-nine men deserted. Total losses were 365 out of a complement of 712 men on departure from Brest. Suffren made up these losses by taking men from frigates and transport ships, recruiting locally and redistributing among the squadron the crews of Orient and Bizarre, which both ran aground in 1782. Research is complicated by these crew movements and by the fact that Suffren gave preference to sailors from Provence for the voyage home, so that they could return home more easily to their family, since he chose Toulon not Brest as his destination. It is estimated that around 40% of the original crew did not return to Toulon.

=== Later career ===
Suffren died in December 1788 and Héros remained stationed at Toulon with the Levant squadron.

Early in 1793 war broke out again between France and Britain and the British seized Héros as she was moored at Toulon when a Royalist cabale surrendered the city to them on 29 August. As the Siege of Toulon ended in the liberation of the city, Captain Sidney Smith had her scuttled by fire on 18–19 December along with Thémistocle and six other ships of the line which he was unable to take with him as prize ships.
