= French cutter Lézard (1781) =

16-gun Cerf-class cutter of the French Navy

History

France
- Name: Lézard
- Builder: Dunkirk, Jacques and Daniel Denys
- Laid down: October 1780
- Launched: 10 March 1781
- In service: June 1781

Great Britain
- Name: HMS Lizard
- Fate: Returned to France

General characteristics
- Class & type: Cerf-class cutter
- Displacement: 130 tonnes
- Length: 26.3 metres
- Beam: 8.4 metres
- Height: 3.9 metres
- Armament: 16 to 18 6-pounder long guns

Lézard was a 16-gun Cerf-class cutter of the French Navy. She was built in 1781, and took part in the Indian theatre of the Anglo-French War. She was captured by the 74-gun HMS Sultan in October 1782 at Trinquebar, and later returned to France.

== Career ==
Lézard was built at by Jacques and Daniel Denys at Dunkirk and launched on 10 March 1781.

On 27 July 1782, Lézard arrived at Puducherry, where Hyder Ali and Suffren were conferring, bringing news of the arrival of Bussy-Castelnau, with the 74-gun Illustre and the 64-gun Saint Michel, on the theatre of operations. In August, Lézard was at Galle.

On 19 August 1782, Lézard brought despatches officially approving of Suffren's conduct at the Battle of Porto Praya, and granting requests he had made to appoint his officers. Furthermore, a letter from Emmanuel de Rohan-Polduc, Grand Master of the Knights Hospitaller, informed Suffren that he was promoted to Bailiff of the Sovereign Military Order of Malta. The next day, Lézard sailed to the neutral, Danish-held port of Tranquebar to conduct reconnaissance. On 26, Lézard covered the landing of French troops in the prelude of the Battle of Trincomalee.

In September 1782, Dufreneau replaced Ensign Saint-Georges as captain of Lézard, and on 25 she sailed to Tranquebar, carrying letters from Suffren to Piveron de Morlat.

On 2 October 1782, the 74-gun HMS Sultan captured Lézard in the roads of the neutral (Danish) port of Tranquebar and took her to Bombay. She was under Lieutenant Thomas Troubridge from October 1782, and from January 1783 under Lieutenant Richard Strachan, and was present at the Battle of Cuddalore.

There she was released back to France in 1783 and re-entered on the lists in January 1784.

== Fate ==
Lézard was struck from the Navy lists in 1784.
