= Pierre-Étienne Labbé de Saint-Georges de Bar =

French Navy officer

- Military career
- Allegiance: France
- Branch: Navy
- Commands: Lézard
- Conflicts: War of American Independence

Pierre-Étienne Labbé de Saint-Georges de Bar (Note: Also spelt "L'Abbé",) was a French Navy officer. He fought in the War of American Independence.

== Biography ==
As an Ensign, Saint-Georges was captain of the 16-gun Lézard, which served as a courier for Suffren's squadron in the Indian Ocean. In September 1782, Dufreneau replaced him at the command of Lézard, as Saint-Georges was promoted to the command of the 32-gun frigate Fine, taking over from La Corne.

== Sources and references ==
Notes

Bibliography

- Caron, François (1996). Le Mythe Suffren. Vincennes: Service historique de la Marine.
- Cunat, Charles (1852). Histoire du Bailli de Suffren. Rennes: A. Marteville et Lefas.
- Oury, Guy-M. (1990). "Une famille canadienne dans la tourmente révolutionnaire : le Chevalier de la Corne". Les Cahiers des dix (45): 67–94. doi:10.7202/1015569ar.

External links

- Archives nationales (2011). "Fonds Marine, sous-série B/4: Campagnes, 1571-1785" (PDF).
