= Bernard-Manuel Lusignan =

Naval officer

Bernard-Manuel Lusignan (1749 — Paris, 21 June 1824) was a French Navy officer. He fought in the War of American Independence, and taking part in the French operations in the Indian Ocean under Suffren.

== Biography ==
Born to the family of M. de La Borde, a banker from Bearn, Lusignan joined the Navy as a Garde-Marine on 5 October 1767. He was promoted to lieutenant on 13 March 1779.

He commanded the 18-gun corvette Fortune in Suffren's squadron when it left Brest on 22 March 1781. He took part in the Battle of Porto Praya, where he captured the fireship HMS Infernal; however, Suffren then ordered Lusignan to bring orders to the French transports, and he abandoned Infernal after taking her captain and 15 men prisoners. Infernal returned to Porto Praya harbour.

on 20 August 1782, Lusignan was at the vanguard of the French squadron when it departed Batacalo for the Battle of Trincomalee.

He was later promoted to captain, in 1792.

== Sources and references ==
Notes

Bibliography

- Bajot (1824). Annales maritimes et coloniales. Vol. 2. Paris: Imprimerie royale.
- Cunat, Charles (1852). Histoire du Bailli de Suffren. Rennes: A. Marteville et Lefas.
- Lacour-Gayet, G. (1910). La marine militaire de la France sous le règne de Louis XV. Paris: Honoré Champion.
- Roussel, Claude-Youenn; Forrer, Claude (2019). Tromeling et Suffren, un conflit entre marins. Kronos. ISBN 978-2-917232-88-0.
