= HMS Hannibal (1779) =

Ship of the line of the Royal Navy

History

Great Britain
- Name: HMS Hannibal
- Builder: Adams, Bucklers Hard
- Launched: 26 December 1779
- Captured: 21 January 1782, by the French

France
- Name: Annibal
- Acquired: 21 January 1782
- Fate: Technical hulk in Rochefort from 1792

General characteristics
- Tons burthen: 1054 tons
- Length: 146 ft (45 m)
- Beam: 41 ft (12 m)
- Propulsion: Sails
- Armament: 50 guns of various weights of shot

HMS Hannibal was a 50-gun fourth rate ship of the line of the Royal Navy, built by Adams of Bucklers Hard and launched on 26 December 1779. The French ship Héros captured Hannibal off Sumatra on 21 January 1782.

== British career ==
In October 1781, off Cape of Good Hope, Hannibal encountered the French frigate Bellone, escorting the transports Neker and Sévère. She captured the transports and brought them to Saint Helena.

On 7 December 1781, a French fleet under d'Orves sortied Isle de France, with 11 ships of the line, 3 frigates and 3 corvettes. On 19 January, the 64-gun Sévère detected HMS Hannibal, under Captain Christy. D'Orves detached the 74-gun Héros and the 64-gun Artésien, under Suffren, to investigate. Suffren closed in, making signals according to tables captured at Porto Praya on the East Indiaman Hinchinbrooke, until Hannibal made signals that he was unable to answer. A chase ensued, and with the night Suffren abandoned the pursuit to rejoin his fleet. On 21, the fleet encountered Hannibal again, and again detached Héros, Artésien and Vengeur, but this time with other ships deploying as to ensure communication between the pursuers and the main body of the fleet, allowing Suffren to press on his chase. Suffren caught up with his quarry on 22 around noon and forced her to surrender.

== French career ==
Hannibal was brought into French service as Petit Annibal, to distinguish her from the 74-gun Annibal that was serving in d'Orves' fleet. (Note: English-language histories often refer to her as Hannibal for this reason.) Lieutenant de Ruyter, first officer of Héros, was given command; all the warships in the French fleet were required to contribute personnel to constitute Annibal's crew. The French corvette Lawriston provided a company of the Régiment de hussards de Lauzun. After Thomas d'Estienne d'Orves died on 9 February 1782 and he assumed command of the French forces in the Indian Ocean, Suffren put Captain Morard de Galles in command, while De Ruyter took command of Pourvoyeuse.

Annibal saw service in his five battles with British Admiral Sir Edward Hughes in 1782 and 1783.

At the Battle of Providien, Petit Annibal was third in the French line, behind Artésien (Captain de Maurville). She came within pistol range of his opposite number, HMS Eagle (Captain Reddel) before opening fire. Her captain, Morard de Galles, was wounded but kept his station.

In January 1783, she was under Beaulieu.

== Fate ==
Petit Annibal was decommissioned in 1787 and used as a hulk from 1792.
