= François-Josué de la Corne de Chapt =

French Navy officer of the War of American Independence

François-Josué de la Corne de Chapt (Note: Often spelt "La Cosne", and indifferently spelt "Chapt" or "Chaptes".) (1750–1800) was a Canadian who served as an officer in the French Navy. He served in the War of American Independence.

== Biography ==
La Corne was born in New France in 1750, the fourth child of Élisabeth de Ramezay and of Louis de Chapt de La Corne, l'aîné. He was a nephew of Louis de la Corne, Chevalier de la Corne.

He joined the French Navy as a Garde-Marine on 5 October 1767, and promoted to Ensign on 1 April 1777, and to Lieutenant on 13 March 1779.

La Corned served at Isle de France (Mauritius), and from 1781 he was with the squadron under Suffren operating in the Indian Ocean as second Lieutenant on the 64-gun Brillant. He took part in the Battle of Sadras on 17 February 1782, the Battle of Providien on 12 April 1782 and the Battle of Negapatam on 6 July 1782. On 14 July 1782, in the midst of Suffren's reshuffling of his captains after the Battle of Negapatam, La Corne was given command of the 32-gun frigate Fine.

On 28 July 1782, Fine joined Suffren's squadron at Bahour, where a diplomatic meeting with Hyder Ali was taking place. She was bringing as prize a British brig carrying a cargo of rice, as well as British colonel Horn, who was to take command of the Army of Thanjavur. On 2 August 1782, Fine was at Tharangambadi with spare anchors for the squadron.

On 8 August, as the squadron was sailing for the oncoming Battle of Trincomalee, Fine collided with Héros, snaping Héros' bowsprit. (Note: The incident occurred as the French squadron as passing Trincomalee harbour, where HMS Sceptre and Monmouth were at anchor. Cunat conjectures that if the collision had not happened, he would have investigated the port, and probably destroyed or captured two of Hughes' best ships .)

On 23 September, Labbé de Saint-George replaced La Corne as captain of Fine.

La Corne was made a Knight in the Order of Saint Louis in 1782. He retired from the Navy on 17 July 1785. From then on, he lived at Loches, where he recruited river sailors for service in the Navy.

La Corne was hostile to the French Revolution, and joined the Armée des émigrés in 1792 at Enghien. In 1793, he returned to Canada. He died in the winter of 1800.

== Sources and references ==
Notes

Citations

References

- Caron, François (1996). Le Mythe de Suffren. Vincennes: Service historique de la Marine.
- Cunat, Charles (1852). Histoire du Bailli de Suffren. Rennes: A. Marteville et Lefas. p. 447.
- Lacour-Gayet, Georges (1910). La marine militaire de la France sous le règne de Louis XVI. Paris: Honoré Champion. pp. 431–434.
- Oury, Guy-M. (1990). "Une famille canadienne dans la tourmente révolutionnaire : le Chevalier de la Corne". Les Cahiers des dix (45): 67–94. doi:10.7202/1015569ar.
- Roussel, Claude-Youenn; Forrer, Claude (2019). Tromelin et Suffren - Un conflit entre marins - Biographie et Mémoire justificatif inédit du capitaine de vaisseau Bernard Marie Boudin de Tromelin 1735-1815. SPM-Lettrage. ISBN 978-2-917232-88-0.
