= Sfinks =

Sfinks ("Sphynx" in some languages) may refer to:

- SFINKS, a stream cypher algorithm, in cryptography
- Nagroda Sfinks (Sphynx Award), a former name of the Janusz A. Zajdel Award in science fiction fandom
- Sfinks festival, Belgian festival for world music
- SFinks, Polish science fiction magazine

== See also ==
- Sfinx (disambiguation)
- Sphinx (disambiguation)
