= Louis Laurent de Féderbe, Count of Modave =

French nobleman, military officer, and writer (1725–1777)

- Knight of the Order of Saint Louis
- Born: 25 June 1725; Barraux, France
- Died: 22 December 1777 (aged 52); Machilipatnam, India
- Religion: Roman Catholic

Louis Laurent de Féderbe, Count of Modave, also known as Fayd'herbe de Maudave or just Comte de Modave, was a French soldier and nobleman. He was born on June 25, 1725 at the Château de Fayet in Barraux, in the department of Isère, as the son of Jean Charles Nicolas Féderbe, Count of Modave (or Maudave) and Marie Thérèse Maniquet du Fayet, from old noble families of Dauphiné.

Starting a military career at a young age, he traveled to the Indian subcontinent in 1757, at a time of increasing European involvement in the region through the activities of the French and English East India Companies. He spent several years in India and authored memoirs, published posthumously, where he commented on the political situation of his time and the role of European powers in it, making him one of the first chroniclers of Indian-European relations. He died on December 22, 1777 in the city of Machilipatnam.

== Biography ==
Louis Laurent de Féderbe was a cultured and adventurous man, a lover of literature, a "specialist" in the East Indies, who knew how to discuss the problems of settlement and colonization with those well versed in the topic. He worked as an aide-de-camp to Louis François, Prince of Conti, and was wounded several times in battle. Féderbe began his military training at a relatively early age, which allowed him to participate in almost all the campaigns from 1743 to 1748, as part of the War of the Austrian Succession. Later, during the Seven Years' War, he took part in a victorious military operation in Minorca. The army, having left Toulon on April 10, seized Fort-Saint-Philippe on June 28 and returned in July 1756. Féderbe received the cross of the Order of Saint Louis for his actions.

In 1757, while he was aide-de-camp to Thomas Arthur, Count of Lally-Tollendal, he left for India. The following year, he married Marie Nicole Porcher des Oulches, daughter of Arthur, now the governor of French East India, in Karikal. The French East India Company then recalled him to France and appointed him as the governor of Karikal. This brought him a huge fortune that he invested by buying land on île de France (Mauritius). In 1760, he presented a manuscript he had found in India, Ezourvedam, to Voltaire.

In 1768, he was appointed by Louis XV as Commander for the King on the island of Madagascar. He landed at Fort Dauphin in the hope of founding a colony there. He was recalled to France at the end of 1770 following the difficulties encountered in his enterprise of developing the colony and following reports denouncing his failure. During the two years spent away from Mauritius, his properties were abandoned and lost much of their value. He wrote a memoir on his stay in Madagascar, a text deposited in the National Overseas Archives in Aix en Provence. Additionally, the French translation of Vicente Bacallar's Comentarios de la guerra de España, e historia de su rey Phelipe V, entitled Mémoires pour servir à l'histoire d'Espagne, sous le règne de Philippe V (Amsterdam [Paris], 1756), is attributed to him.

His thirst for adventure sent him back to India where he tried unsuccessfully to enter the service of René-Marie Madec, a sailor honored with the title of nabob. He met the mercenary Walter Reinhardt Sombre in Agra in 1775. He died in poverty in Masulipatam on December 22, 1777.

One of his daughters, Louise Marie Victoire Henriette, married Justin Bonaventure Morard de Galles on December 22, 1783 in Port Louis (Mauritius).

== Writing ==
Besides his translations and his memoirs regarding Madagascar, Louis Laurent de Féderbe is best known for authoring an additional set of memoirs towards the end of his life, about his experiences in India. Following his death, his memoirs were sent to France alongside several other papers, where they remained in the National Library for around 200 years, until they were curated and published as a book in 1971, which was finally translated into English in 2023. In his memoirs, Féderbe recounts the political struggles for supremacy among the European Powers, the Maratha Confederacy, and various other actors, in the middle of the weakening and dissolution of the once dominant Mughal Empire. At this time, European traders had increasingly shifted from textile commerce to militarization, becoming in effect mercenary companies. Regarding European involvement, Féderbe said:

The Mughal Empire held together while Aurangzeb reigned, and even for some years after he died in the early years of this century. For generally beneficial laws have a certain inner strength which allows them, for a time, to resist the assaults of anarchy. But at last, about forty years ago, a horrible chaos overtook the Mughal empire: any spark of good that Aurangzeb had done to promote commerce was snuffed out. Ruthlessly ambitious Europeans were no less deadly in these parts, as if Europe and America were too small a theatre of war for them to devour each other, pursuing chimeras of self-interest, and undertaking violent and unjust resolutions, they insisted on Asia too as the stage on which to act out their restless injustices.

== Bibliography ==
- Foury, B. (1955). "Maudave et la colonisation de Madagascar (Ier partie)". Outre-Mers. Revue d'histoire. 42 (148): 343–404. doi:10.3406/outre.1955.1244. ; Foury, B. (1956). "Maudave et la colonisation de Madagascar (IIe partie)". Outre-Mers. Revue d'histoire. 43 (150): 14–81. doi:10.3406/outre.1956.1252.
- François Pouillon, Dictionnaire des orientalistes de langue française, Lettres du Sud, 2008
- Jean Deloche (éd.), Voyage en Inde du Comte de Modave, 1773-1776: nouveaux mémoires sur l'état actuel du Bengale et de l'Indoustan, École française d'Extrême-Orient, 1971
- Roger Glachant, Histoire de l'Inde des Français, Éditions d'histoire et d'art, Librairie Plon, 1965
- Henri Pouget de Saint-André, La Colonisation de Madagascar sous Louis XV : d'après la correspondance inédite du Comte de Maudave, Challamel Ainé, 1886 Texte en ligne
