= Sfinx =

Sfinx may refer to:

- SFINX, Service for French Internet Exchange
- Sfinx (band), a Romanian rock band
- Edle Hartmann (1862–1946), pen name Sfinx, Norwegian writer
- Sfinx, a restaurant chain in Poland
- Sfinx, candy manufacturer located in Holešov, Czech Republic

== See also ==
- Sfinks (disambiguation)
- Sphinx (disambiguation)
