= Henry D'Esterre Darby =

Royal Navy Admiral of the Blue (1749–1823)

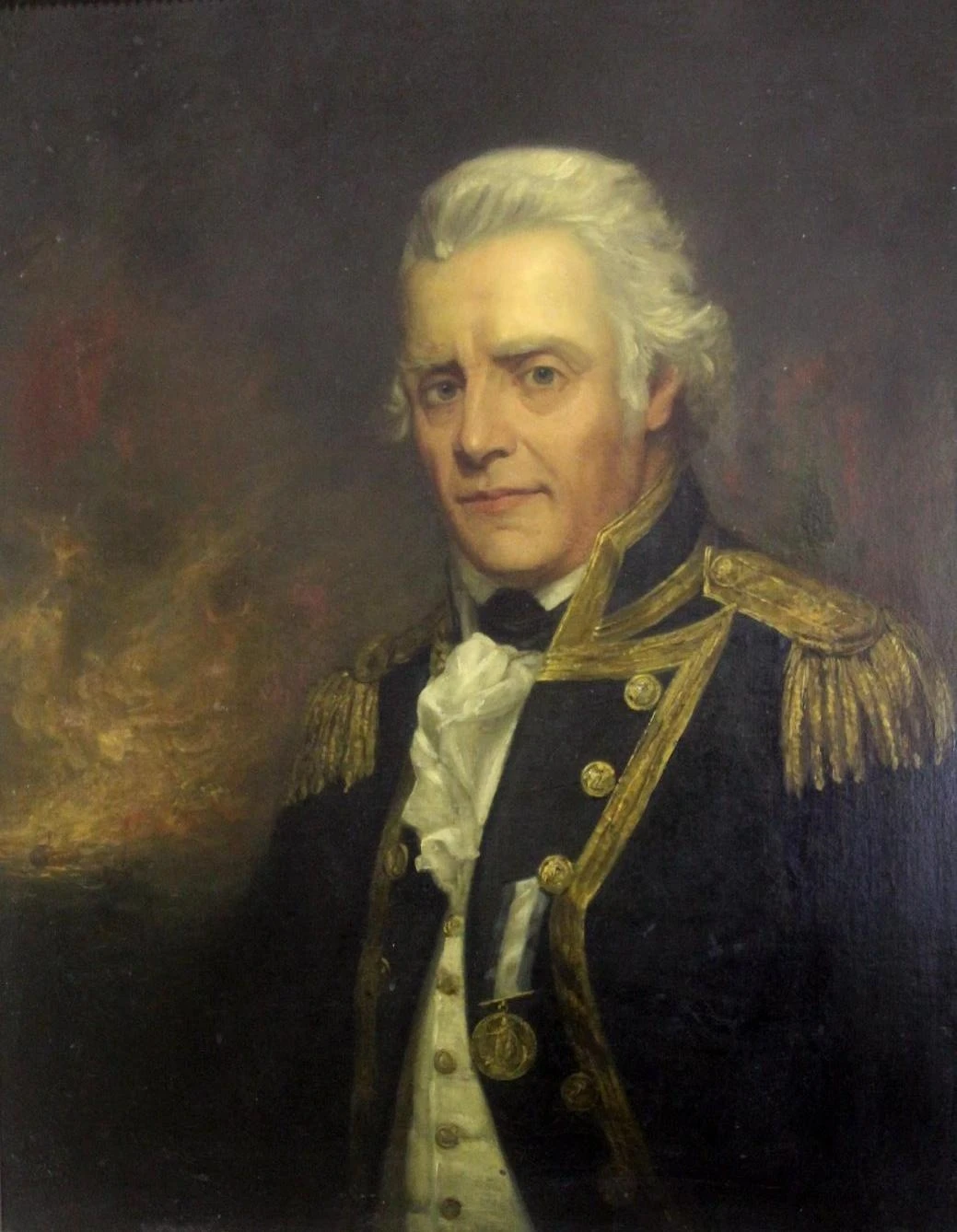
1801 portrait of Darby by Sir William Beechey

Admiral of the Blue Sir Henry D'Esterre Darby, KCB (9 April 1749 – 30 March 1823) was a Royal Navy officer. He was the third son of Jonathan and Susannah Darby of Leap Castle, in King's County, Ireland. He was the nephew of Vice-admiral George Darby. Darby first went to sea when he was thirteen but it was another fourteen years before he made lieutenant, aboard his uncle's ship HMS Britannia. In 1781, he was given command of the 8-gun Infernal but was captured after an inconclusive action at the Battle of Porto Praya and remained a prisoner for the rest of the war.

Darby was promoted to captain in 1783 and commanded HMS Bellerophon at the Battle of the Nile in 1798. A letter written by Horatio Nelson after the battle, survives:

My Dear Darby,
I grieve for your heavy loss of Brave fellows, but look at our glorious Victory. We will give you every assistance as soon as you join us, till then God Bless You.
Ever yours faithfully,
Horatio Nelson
We shall both I trust soon get well.

— Admiral Nelson, 3 August 1798

Darby was promoted to Rear-Admiral of the Blue in 1804; Rear-Admiral of the White in 1805; Rear-Admiral of the Red in 1808; Vice-Admiral of the Blue in 1810; Vice-Admiral of the White in 1811; Vice-Admiral of the Red in 1814 and finally Admiral of the Blue in 1819. He was appointed Knight Commander of the Order of the Bath in 1820.

== Arms ==
Coat of arms of Sir Henry D'Esterre Darby
Crest A garb Or, banded witli a naval crown Azure, in front of an anchor placed in sinister bend Sable. Escutcheon Azure, on a chevron Argent, between three garbs Or, a naval coronet of the First between two anchors Sable; pendant in the centre chief from a ribbon of the Second, fimbriated of the Field, a representation of the gold medal conferred upon the said Admiral by command of His Majesty in commemoration of his gallant conduct at the Battle of the Nile, when In command of H.M.S. Bellerophon. Beneath the said medal the word "Nile" inscribed in gold letters upon the field. Motto Spero meliora

== Bibliography ==
- Cordingly, David. (2003). The Billy Ruffian: The Bellerophon and the Downfall of Napoleon. Bloomsbury USA.
- Hore, Peter (2015). Nelson's Band of Brothers. Barnsley: Seaforth Publishing.
- Access to Archives: Darby family of London, Warbleton and Leap Castle
