= French frigate Fine (1779) =

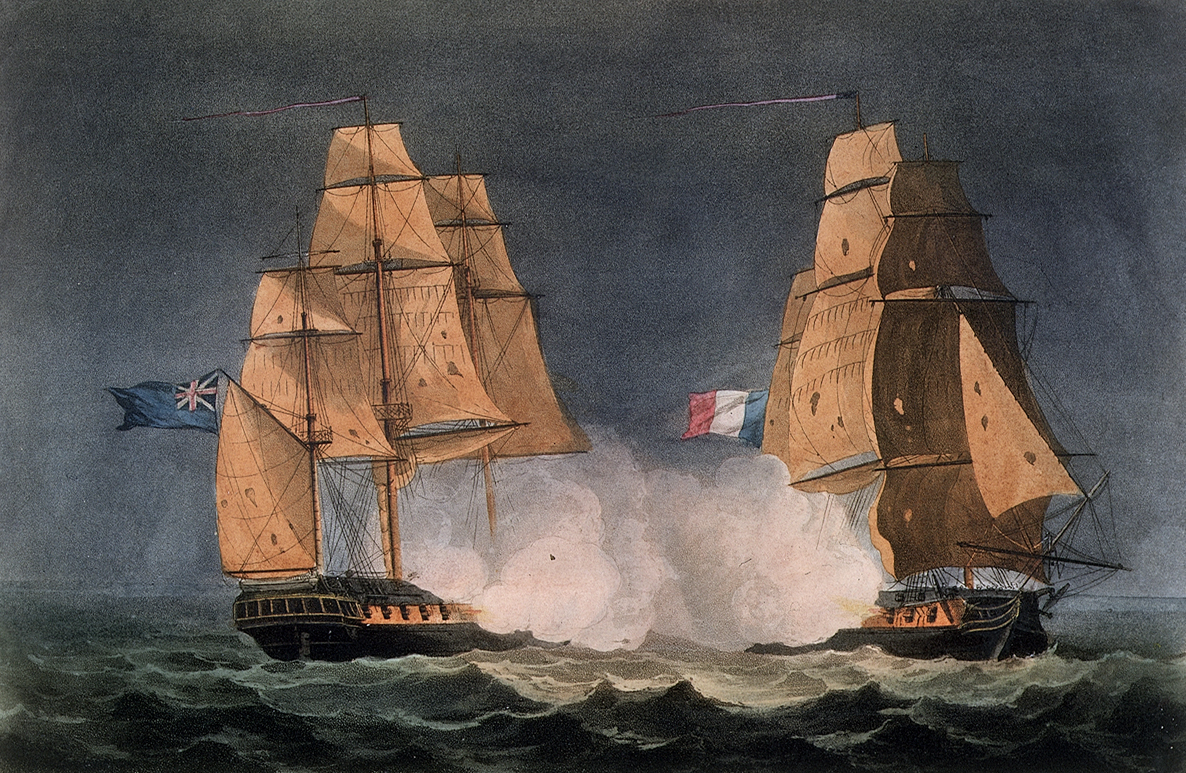
- Fine's sister ship Néréide (right) in 1797

History

France
- Name: Fine
- Namesake: clever
- Builder: Rochefort. Plans by Sané
- Laid down: October 1778
- Launched: 11 August 1779
- Commissioned: October 1779
- Fate: Wrecked in Chesapeake Bay in November 1793

General characteristics
- Class & type: Sybille-class frigate
- Displacement: 1,082 tonneaux
- Tons burthen: 600 port tonneaux; 892 22/94 (Builder's Old Measurement)
- Length: 43.91 m (144 ft 1 in) (overall); 39.14 m (128 ft 5 in) (keel)
- Beam: 11.21 m (36 ft 9 in)
- Draught: 5.36 m (17 ft 7 in) (laden)
- Propulsion: Sail
- Complement: 290
- Armament: Gun deck: 26 × 12-pounder gusn; Spar deck: 6 × 6-pounder guns

Fine was a Sibylle-class 32-gun, copper-hulled, frigate of the French Navy.

== Career ==
On 4 December 1778, Fine departed Brest under Lieutenant Saint-Félix, bound for the Cape of Good Hope and ultimately for Isle de France (Mauritius), carrying Étienne Claude Chevreau ,Intendant des îles de France et de Bourbon.

=== Indian Ocean campaign of the American Revolutionary War ===
On 16 April 1781, she was part of Suffren's squadron at the Battle of Porto Praya, although she did not take part in the action. She took part in several actions in the Indian Ocean. In November 1781, Captain Périer de Salvert took command. Fine was part of the French frigate screen at the Battle of Providien, where she collided with HMS Isis before unentangling herself, then ran aground, then caught fire, but managed to save herself. In June, Fine captured the 24-gun storeship Yarmouth, carrying rice, field artillery and nine British Army officers.

On 23 June, Fine captured the East Indiaman Fortitude. When the French captured her they freed some eight men from Artésien, who had been part of the French prize crew at the Battle of Porto Praya. Fine brought Fortitude to Cuddalore, where Suffren's squadron was anchored, arriving there on 29 June.

On 14 July 1782, (Note: Cunat 1852, p. 198 suggests 7 July, while Lacour-Gayet 1910, p. 659 says 14 July.) following the Battle of Negapatam, Suffren appointed La Corne to Fine, (Note: Often spelt "La Cosne".) replacing Salvert whom he had promoted to Flamand. On 28 July 1782, Fine joined Suffren's squadron at Bahour, where a diplomatic meeting with Hyder Ali was taking place. She was bringing as prize a British brig carrying a cargo of rice, as well as British colonel Horn, who was to take command of the Army of Thanjavur. On 2 August 1782, Fine was at Tharangambadi with spare anchors for the squadron.

On 8 August, as the squadron was sailing for the oncoming Battle of Trincomalee, Fine collided with Héros, snapping Héros' bowsprit. (Note: The incident occurred as the French squadron as passing Trincomalee harbour, where HMS Sceptre and Monmouth were at anchor. Cunat conjectures that if the collision had not happened, he would have investigated the port, and probably destroyed or captured two of Hughes' best ships .)

On 23 September 1782, L'Abbé de Saint-Georges took command of Fine.

In January 1783, Fine was under Chevalier de Saint-Georges. She intercepted the East Indiaman Bland-Fort but engaged from too far away and wasted her ammunition in a futile attempt to stop her. Three days after, Fine was thus unable to engage two other Indiamen when they passed nearby. Bland-Fort would be captured on 12 January by M. d'Herly, captaining Coventry, herself captured and recommissioned in the French Royal Navy that very day.

=== Later career ===
On 5 February 1791, under Augustin Truguet (1753–1793), she departed Brest, as part of a squadron bound for Martinique.

In October 1793, she departed for France.

== Fate ==
Fine was wrecked in November 1793 in Chesapeake Bay.
