= Justin Bonaventure Morard de Galles =

French Navy officer and politician (1741–1809)

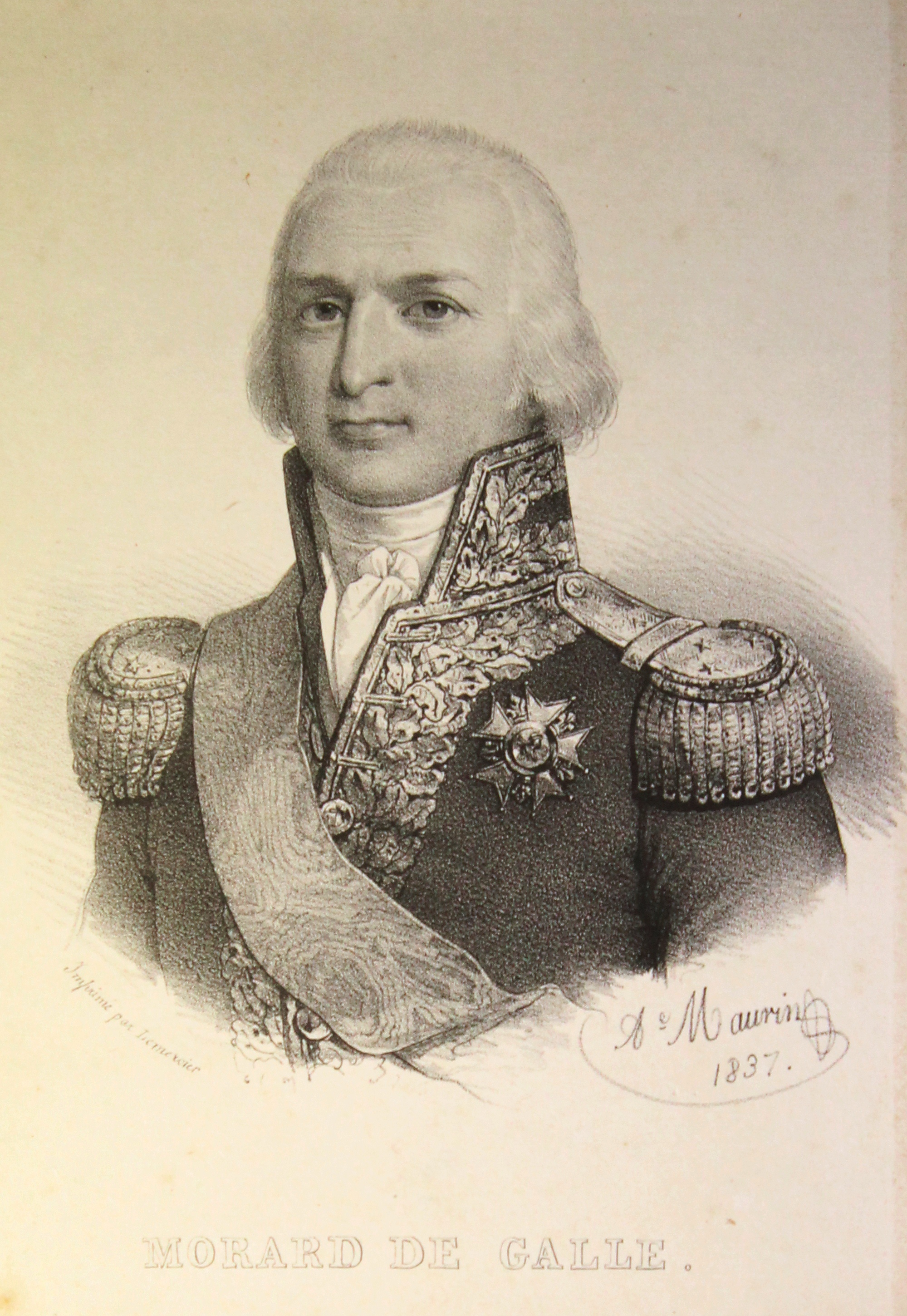
- Born: 30 March 1741; Goncelin, France
- Died: 23 July 1809 (aged 68); Guéret, France
- Relatives: Charles Morard de La Bayette de Galles
- Military career
- Allegiance: Kingdom of France; French First Republic
- Branch: French Navy
- Rank: Vice admiral
- Conflicts: American Revolutionary War; Battle of Ushant; Battle of Sadras; Battle of Providien; Battle of Trincomalee; French Revolutionary Wars

Vice-Admiral Justin-Bonaventure Morard de Galles (French pronunciation: [ʒystɛ̃ bɔnavɑ̃tyʁ mɔʁaʁ də ɡal]; 30 March 1741 – 23 July 1809) was a French Navy officer and politician.

== Family ==
Morard was born to a noble family from Dauphiné whose origins stretched right back to the end of the 11th century. His father was an infantry captain, and his elder brother Charles Morard de La Bayette de Galles was a général de Division under the Revolution and the Directory.

On 22 December 1783 he married Louise Marie Victoire Henriette Fayd'herbe de Maudave at Port-Louis, Mauritius. She was the daughter of French-Indian official Louis Laurent de Féderbe. To this day there are many descendants of her siblings still living in Mauritius

== Biography ==
=== Ancien Régime ===
Morard began his naval career in 1757 on the brig Ecureuil and took part in many combats in the Mediterranean and the Americas as part of the Royal French Navy with the rank of garde de pavillon. He entered the service at the age of 11, in the gardes de la maison du roi.

In 1765, the comte de Grasse was charged with clearing the Mediterranean of its infestation of Barbary pirates. In 1765, on Héroïne as enseigne de vaisseau, Morard de Galles participated in the bombardment of Morocco's Atlantic coast. The young Morard de Galles next became an ensign on board the frigate Hermine, and there received a mission to burn one of the corsairs which had taken refuge under the protection of the coastal batteries. Favoured by a cloudy night, he boarded the corsair vessel and attached a coat of sulphur to one of her sides - a terrible explosion half an hour later announced the success of this audacious enterprise.

Returning to France, he remained attached to the group directing the naval building works at Brest until 1776, when he took to sea again in Duchaffault's squadron. Promoted to lieutenant de vaisseau in 1777, he distinguished himself the following year at the Battle of Ushant on Ville de Paris, and in the actions of 17 April, 15 and 19 May 1780.

Morard was first officer on Annibal, under Trémigon, when she left with a division under Captain Suffren bound for the Dutch Cape Colony and Isle de France (Mauritius). Trémigon was killed and Morard took command of Annibal, although he was himself wounded.

On 1 November 1781, Morard was given command of the 40-gun frigate Pourvoyeuse. After Thomas d'Estienne d'Orves died on 9 February 1782 and he assumed command of the French forces in the Indian Ocean, Suffren promoted him to the command of the 50-gun Petit Annibal, recently captured from the British, while her former captain, Lieutenant de Ruyter, took command of Pourvoyeuse.

Morard commanded Petit Annibal in the Battle of Sadras on 17 February 1782, the Battle of Providien on 12 April 1782, and in the Battle of Trincomalee from 25 August to 3 September 1782, sustaining three new wounds which incapacitated him. Morard de Galles requested to be relieved and left the squadron after the Battle of Trincomalee, embarking on Pulvérisateur on 3 September 1782, bound for Isle de France. However, he had barely arrived at Isle de France when he was appointed to Argonaute and ordered to rejoin the squadron outside Gondelour. He then commanded various ships in the West Indies, then returned to France on Vengeur.

=== French Revolution ===
His health weakened by his wounds, Morard eventually requested to return to France in 1790. He was promoted to rear admiral and given command of a division. Morard was promoted to vice admiral in 1793 and given command of a squadron of three ships of the line and 7 frigates, with his flag on the 110-gun Républicain. He first sailed to Saint-Domingue, then back to France, patrolling between Groix and Belle-Île to allow safe passage for merchant shipping into France's ports in spite of the British blockade. However, a lack of morale and basic necessities led his crew to mutiny, and forced him to return to the roads off Brest. Upon his return, he found the Reign of Terror well in motion, and was arrested. He remained a prisoner until the Thermidorian Reaction.

Morard remained unemployed for several years before he was offered a new command. In 1798, he was given a division in a squadron under Louis Thomas Villaret de Joyeuse for an expedition to Ireland, with 15 ships of the line, 12 frigates, 6 corvettes or avisos, and 9 transport vessels were to transport 15000 soldiers under General Lazare Hoche. The planned invasion was an attempt to intervene in favour of the Irish Rebellion of 1798. Soon before departure, Morard had to replace Villaret. The fleet departed on 5 December 1796, with Morard's flag on the frigate Fraternité. This expedition was a failure: Séduisant was wrecked in the passe du Raz as she tried to sail out of Brest, and long before seeing Bantry Bay, the fleet was blocked by opposing winds and had to find refugee in Rochefort.

=== Consulate and First Empire ===
During the Consulate and First Empire, Morard rebounded from his Irish humiliation. He became a member of the Sénat conservateur from its inception on 25 December 1799. He was made a Knight of the Legion of Honour on 2 October 1803, and Grand Officier 14 June 1804. Napoléon also awarded Morard the titular lands of the sénatorerie of Limoges on 2 May 1804. In 1808, he and made Morard a comte de l'Empire.

Morard died at Guéret on 23 July 1809. The municipal council voted funds to build a monument to his memory. Morard's ashes were taken to the Panthéon.
