= Valentine (1780 EIC ship) =

History

Great Britain
- Name: Valentine
- Owner: Donald Cameron
- Operator: East India Company
- Builder: Perry, Blackwall, or Randall
- Launched: October 1780
- Fate: Sold for breaking up in 1796

General characteristics
- Tons burthen: 755, or 790, or 79066/94, or 797 (bm)
- Length: Overall:143 ft 8 in (43.8 m); Keel:116 ft 7 in (35.5 m) (keel)
- Beam: 35 ft 8 1/2 in (10.9 m)
- Depth of hold: 14 ft 7 in (4.4 m)
- Propulsion: Sails
- Sail plan: Full-rigged ship
- Complement: 1794:80; 1795:78
- Armament: 1794:14 × 12&4-pounder guns + 6 swivel guns; 1795:26 × 12&6-pounder guns
- Notes: Three decks

Valentine was launched in 1780 as an East Indiaman. She made six voyages for the British East India Company (EIC), and was a transport for one military campaign. On her first voyage she was present at an inconclusive battle with the French, but did not take an active part. She was sold in 1796 for breaking up.

== Career ==
=== EIC voyage #1 (1781–1783) ===
Captain John Lewis sailed from Portsmouth on 13 March 1781, bound for Madras and Bengal. Valentine was part of a convoy of Indiamen accompanying a British squadron under Commodore George Johnstone. At about the same time as the British sailed, a French squadron under the command of Bailli de Suffren left France. Both squadrons were en route to the Cape of Good Hope, the British to take it from the Dutch, the French aiming to help defend it and French possessions in the Indian Ocean, including Rodriguez Island, Ile Bourbon (Réunion), Île de France (Mauritius), and Pondicherry.

The British stopped at São Tiago to take on water. Valentine arrived there on 10 April. The French squadron attacked the British on 16 April in the battle of Porto Praya. Due to the unexpected nature of the encounter, neither fleet was prepared for the engagement and the result was an inconclusive battle in which the French warships sustained more damage than did the British. Though the battle was inconclusive, it did enable the French to forestall the British attack on the Cape. The British sailed on to the Cape. At the Cape, Johnstone captured five Dutch East Indiamen at the battle of Saldanha Bay. The British Indiamen then sailed on, directly, or indirectly, to India.

Valentine reached Madras on 18 August, and arrived at Kedgeree on 28 September. She returned to Madras on 23 November, was at Negapatam on 23 December, Madras again on 22 January 1782, and Kedgeree on 22 February. Homeward bound, she was at 10 Apr Barrabulla (a sandbank that forms near Kedgeree) on 12 April, and reached St Helena on 12 September. She left St Helena on 26 November, and arrived at the Downs on 21 February 1783.

=== EIC voyage #2 (1784–1785) ===
Captain Lewis sailed from The Downs on 1 January 1784, bound for Madras and Bengal. Valentine left the Cape of Good Hope on 20 April, reached Madras on 29 June, and arrived at Kedgeree on 25 July. She left Kedgeree on 23 January 1785, reached the Cape on 17 April and St Helena on 16 May, and arrived at the Downs on 8 August.

=== EIC voyage #3 (1786–1787) ===
Captain Thomas Wall sailed from The Downs on 17 January 1786, bound for Madras and China. Valentine reached São Tiago on 16 February, and Madras on 26 May. She left Madras on 24 July, reached Malacca on 28 August, and arrived at Whampoa anchorage on 21 September. Homeward bound, she crossed the Second Bar on 4 February 1787, reached St Helena on 23 May, and arrived at the Downs on 20 July.

=== EIC voyage #4 (1788–1790) ===
Captain John Lewis sailed from The Downs on 13 December 1788, bound for Madras and China. Valentine reached Madeira on 29 December and São Tiago on 26 January 1789. She arrived at Madras on 1 May. She sailed from Madras on 10 July, reached Penang on 1 August, and arrived at Whampoa on 18 September. Homeward bound, she crossed the Second Bar on 3 December, reached St Helena on 18 February 1790, and arrived at the Downs on 25 April.

=== EIC voyage #5 (1792–1793) ===
Captain Iver McMillan sailed from The Downs on 9 March 1792, bound for St Helena, Bengal, Madras, and Bencoolen. Valentine reached St Helena on 11 May, Diamond Point on 6 August, "'Monsourcottah" on 21 September, and Diamond Harbour on 2 November. She sailed from Saugor on 2 January 1793, reached Madras on 12 January, and arrived at Bencoolen on 20 February. Homeward bound, she sailed from Bencoolen on 13 March, was at St Helena between 11 May and 21 June, and arrived at the Downs on 21 August.

=== EIC voyage #6 (1794–1795) ===
War with France had broken out in 1793. Captain Iver McMillan acquired a letter of marque on 13 March 1794.

The British government held Valentine at Portsmouth, together with 38 other Indiamen in anticipation of using them as transports for an attack on Île de France (Mauritius). It gave up the plan and released the vessels in May 1794. It paid £417 5s 4d for having delayed her departure by 22 days.

Captain McMillan sailed from Portsmouth on 2 May, bound for Bengal. Valentine arrived at Diamond Harbour on 12 September. Homeward bound, she was at Cox's Island on 28 November and left on 8 January 1795. She arrived at St Helena on 18 March and left on 14 May. She arrived at the Downs on 23 July.

=== West Indies Expedition (1795-96) ===
The Admiralty chartered Valentine as a troopship for Admiral Hugh Cloberry Christian's expedition to the West Indies. Captain Henry Hughes acquired a letter of marque on 30 October 1795.

She sailed for the West Indies on 9 December, but bad weather delayed the start of the expedition and the vessels had to put back to England. After numerous false starts aborted by weather issues, the fleet sailed on 26 April to invade St Lucia, with troops under Lieutenant-General Sir Ralph Abercromby. St Lucia surrendered to the British on 25 May. The British went on to capture Saint Vincent and Grenada.

== Fate ==
Valentine returned to England in 1796 and was sold for breaking up.
