= Yarmouth (1782 ship) =

British merchantman

History

Great Britain
- Name: Yarmouth
- Captured: June 1782

France
- Name: Yarmouth
- Acquired: 1782 by capture
- Fate: Sold

General characteristics
- Tons burthen: 450
- Complement: 116 men
- Armament: 16 × 12-pounder long guns; 6 × 18-pounder carronades

Yarmouth was a British merchantman operating on the coast of India in 1782. (Note: Cunat calls her an East Indiaman. She was a country ship. That is, she traded around India and with south east Asia, but because of the British East India Company's monopoly on the trade between Great Britain and Asia, was not allowed to trade west of the Cape of Good Hope.) The French frigate Fine captured her in June 1782. She went on the serve as a storeship in the squadron under Suffren.

== Career ==
The French frigate Fine captured Yarmouth in June 1782. She was carrying rice, field artillery, and nine officers for the British Army of Thanjavur garrisoned at Tiruchirappalli. Lloyd's List simply reported that the French fleet had captured "the Yarmouth Storeship, from Bengal, laden with Stores".

In early July 1782, during the run-up to the Battle of Negapatam, Suffren sent Fortitude and Yarmouth to Île de France (Mauritius). After the battle, the rigging of Yarmouth was used to replace those of Pulvérisateur and Sylphide, which had given theirs to repair the rigging of Suffren's ships of the line. The hull of Yarmouth was sold at Cuddalore. No information regarding the vessel or her service reached French naval records; she does not appear in Roche.
