= Ezourvedam =

Forged Vedic text

The Ezourvedam is a forgery "consisting of certain 'Vedic' materials translated by Jesuits with the intention of isolating elements most in harmony with Christianity". Rather than being an original Sanskrit work, the Ezourvedam turned out to be a French text that was written by French Jesuits and meant to be translated into Sanskrit.

== History and authorship ==
A manuscript called Ezourvedam was given to Voltaire in 1760 by Louis Laurent de Féderbe, Count of Modave. The text was in French, and said to be a French translation of a Sanskrit original. Voltaire was enthusiastic about the work, had it copied and brought it to the attention of others. However, by 1761, Voltaire regarded the text to be a mere commentary on the Vedas. It was first published in 1778 (Voltaire died that same year).

The genuineness of the Ezourvedam was questioned in 1782; the doubts were confirmed in 1822. Rather than an original Sanskrit work, the Ezourvedam turned out to be a French text that was written by French Jesuits and meant to be translated into Sanskrit.

== Title ==
The name Ezourvedam was sometimes taken to be a corruption of Yajurveda, but the Ezourvedam has nothing in common with the Yajurveda. The Ezourvedam itself refers to the Yajurveda as Zozu-vedam. "Ezour" is the sandhi form of "Ezous-", that is, "Jezus", based on the Latin pronunciation that used by the Jesuits. The name "Ezourvedam" means something like "Gospel of Jesus".

== Content ==
Ezourvedam is a French text in the form of a dialogue between two Vedic sages, one monotheist and one polytheist, they conclude the monotheism of 'pristine Hinduism' points to Christian truth and Hinduism is monotheism masquerading as polytheism concealing monotheism. Adimo is the first human, and Procriti the first woman, in a creation story in the Ezourvedam.

== See also ==
- Roberto de Nobili
- Orientalism

== Sources ==
- App, Urs (2011), The Birth of Orientalism. Chapter 1: Voltaire's Veda, University of Pennsylvania Press, ISBN 978-0812200058
- Carrillo, Carlos Alonzo (2009), La bestia: controversias del cristianismo, Edamex, p. https://es.wikipedia.org/wiki/Carlos_Alonzo_Carrillo, ISBN 9786074390018
- Cowan, Robert (2010), The Indo-German Identification: Reconciling South Asian Origins and European Destinies, 1765-1885, Camden House Publishing, ISBN 9781571134639
- Maurer, Walter Harding (1988), "Review of "Ezourvedam: A French Veda of the Eighteenth Century"", Journal of the American Oriental Society, 108 (2), doi:10.2307/603676, JSTOR 603676
- Rocher, Ludo (1984), Ezourvedam: A French Veda of the Eighteenth Century, John Benjamins Publishing, ISBN 0915027062
