= Sphinx Island =

Island in Graham Land, Antarctica

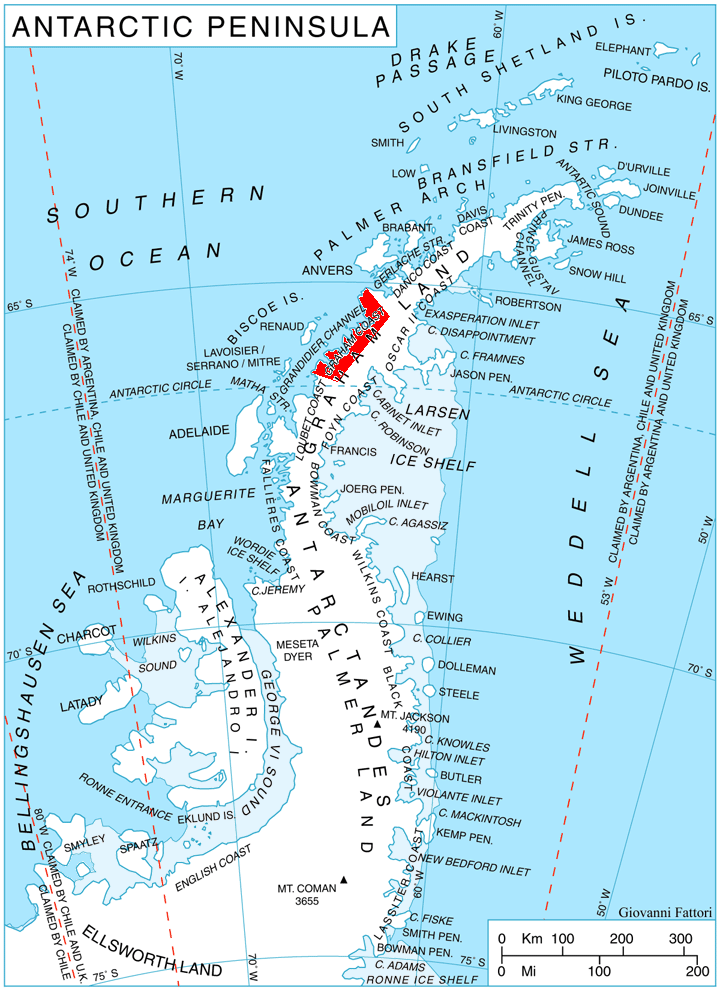
Location of Graham Coast on the Antarctic Peninsula.

Sphinx Island (65°54′S 64°53′W) is an island 2 nautical miles (3.7 km) long and 1 nautical mile (1.9 km) wide, having a bare rocky summit with vertical faces on all four sides, lying in the entrance to Barilari Bay north of Loqui Point on Velingrad Peninsula, Graham Land in Antarctica. Discovered and named by the British Graham Land Expedition (BGLE), 1934–37, under Rymill.

== See also ==
- List of Antarctic and sub-Antarctic islands
