= French corvette Sylphide =

French Navy ship

History

France
- Name: Sylphide
- Builder: Indret
- Laid down: July 1762
- Launched: July 1763
- Commissioned: October 1763
- Fate: Wrecked near Camaret on 2 September 1784

General characteristics
- Displacement: 190 tonnes
- Length: 29.9 metres
- Beam: 8.0 metres
- Draught: 3.7 metres
- Propulsion: Sail
- Armament: 12 4-pounder guns

Sylphide (also written Silphide) was a 12-gun corvette of the French Navy.

== Career ==
From 1776 to 1777, she was under Lieutenant Bidé de Maurville.

During the War of American Independence, Sylphide served in the Indian Ocean in the squadron under Suffren, ferrying despatches. In early July 1782, during the run-up of the Battle of Negapatam, Suffren chose her and Diligent to bring news of the outcome of the battle to Isle de France. After the battle, her rigging was dismantled to replace parts on Suffren's ships of the line, and she received herself parts from the rigging of Yarmouth and from another prize as replacement.

From July 1784, she was used as a transport. On 2 September, she was wrecked at Pointe du Toulinguet
