= Sphinx (album) =

Studio album by Allegro Jazz Ensemble
- Released: 1986
- Recorded: 1981–1986
- Genre: Post-bop
- Length: 37:29
- Label: Mobile Fidelity
- Producer: Nikolay Levinovsky

Sphinx is an album by Soviet jazz ensemble Allegro Jazz Ensemble recorded between 1981–1986 and released on the Mobile Fidelity label.

== Reception ==
Professional ratings
Review scores
Source	Rating
AllMusic	3/5 stars

The AllMusic review by Scott Yanow called Sphinx "An above average (if not overly distinctive) modern mainstream release."

== Track listing ==
Compositions by Nikolay Levinovsky.

1. "In This World: First Movement" - 6:27
2. "In This World: Second Movement" - 4:37
3. "In This World: Third Movement" - 8:09
4. "In This World: Fourth Movement" - 4:31
5. "Legend: First Movement" - 7:50
6. "Legend: Second Movement" - 7:21
7. "Legend: Third Movement" - 5:38
8. "Sphinx" - 9:46
9. "Portrait" - 13:45
