= Saint-Méloir-des-Bois =

Saint-Méloir-des-Bois Sant-Melar
- Commune
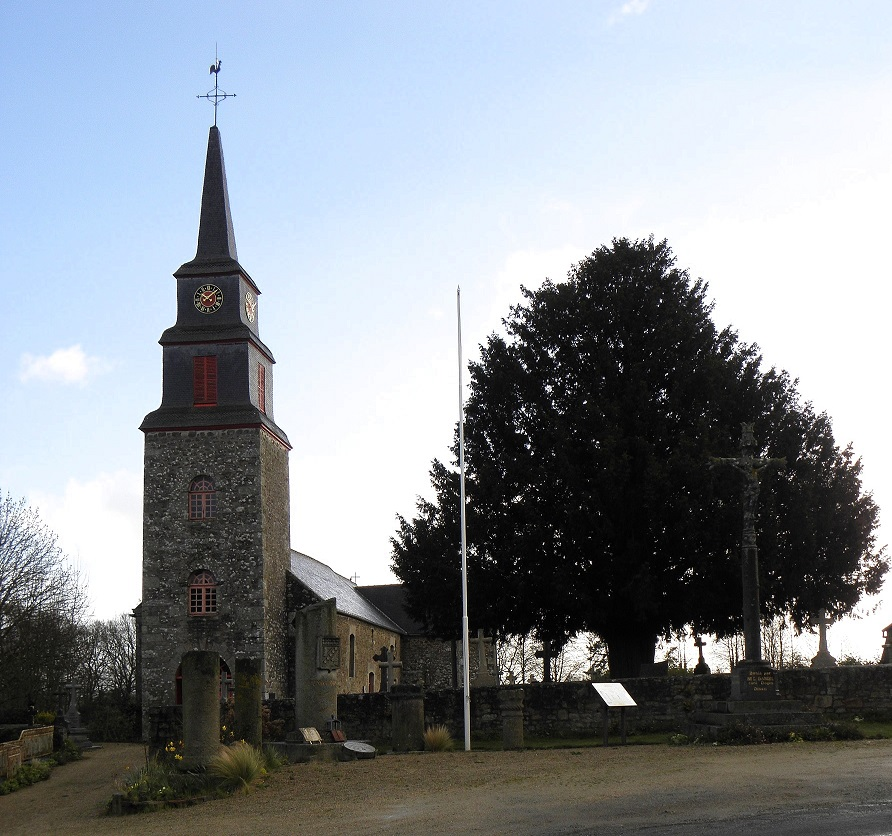
- The church of Saint-Méloir, in Saint-Méloir-des-Bois
- Location of Saint-Méloir-des-Bois
- Location within France Location within Brittany
- Coordinates: 48°27′30″N 2°14′59″W
- Country: France
- Region: Brittany
- Department: Côtes-d'Armor
- Arrondissement: Dinan
- Canton: Plancoët
- Intercommunality: Dinan Agglomération

Government
  - Mayor (2020–2026): Michel Desbois
- Area^{1}: 6.13 km^{2} (2.37 sq mi)
- Highest elevation: 122 m (400 ft)
- Lowest elevation: 50 m (160 ft)
- Population (2023): 270
  - Density: 44/km^{2} (110/sq mi)
- Time zone: UTC+01:00 (CET)
  - Summer (DST): UTC+02:00 (CEST)
- INSEE/Postal code: 22317 /22980
- ^{1} French Land Register data, which excludes lakes, ponds, glaciers > 1 km^{2} (0.386 sq mi or 247 acres) and river estuaries.

Saint-Méloir-des-Bois (Breton: Sant-Melar, before 1997: Saint-Méloir) is a commune in the Côtes-d'Armor department of Brittany in northwestern France.

== Population ==
Historical population
Year	Pop.	±% p.a.
1968	252	—
1975	211	−2.50%
1982	216	+0.34%
1990	236	+1.11%
1999	233	−0.14%
2007	265	+1.62%
2012	262	−0.23%
2017	258	−0.31%
2023	270	+0.76%
Source: INSEE

Inhabitants of Saint-Méloir-des-Bois are called méloriens in French.

== See also ==
- Communes of the Côtes-d'Armor department
