= French corvette Diligent (1781) =

History

British East India Company
- Name: Tannah
- Namesake: Tannah
- Operator: Bengal Pilot Service
- Builder: Bombay Dockyard
- Launched: 1775
- Captured: 24 January 1781

France
- Name: Diligent
- Acquired: By capture, January 1781
- Fate: Sank 1782

General characteristics
- Tons burthen: 142 (bm)
- Propulsion: Sail
- Sail plan: Brig
- Armament: 10 guns

Diligent (or Petit Diligent), was the Bengal Pilot Service schooner Tannah (or Tanna), that the Bombay Dockyard had launched in 1775 for the Bengal Pilot Service of the British East India Company (EIC). The French Navy captured her in 1781. She then became a 10-gun corvette of the French Navy, but sank in 1782.

== Career ==
Although Tannah is described as a pilot schooner, that may reflect her role rather than her sailing rig. She was one of a number of pilot vessels that the Bengal Pilot Service operated to help East Indiamen and other vessels approaching the mouth of the Hooghly River.

On 24 January 1781, off Pulicat, Flamand captured Tannah (or Tanna), as Tanna was coming into Madras with two small prizes.

Within the year, the French brought Tannah to Île de France (Mauritius), converted her to a corvette, and recommissioned her under the name Diligent.

Diligent, Captain Macé, was present on 6 July 1782 at the Battle of Negapatam. After the battle, Suffren sent her and Sylphide to bring news of the outcome of the battle to Île de France.

== Fate ==
In August 1782, Diligent sank off Cuddalore.
