= French ship Sphinx =

Several French ships have held the name Sphinx:

- French ship Sphinx (1755), a third-rate ship of the line, 64 guns, launched 1755 at Brest, fought in the Seven Years' War, scrapped 1775 in Brest
- French ship Sphinx (1776), third-rate ship of the line, 64 guns, launched 1776 in Brest, fought in the American Revolutionary War
- HMS Sphinx (1775), sixth-rate ship, captured from the British on 10 September 1779, recaptured by the British on 29 December 1779, broken up 1811
- French brig Sphinx (1813), brig, launched in Genoa in 1813
- French corvette Sphinx (1829), launched 1829, first steamship in the French Navy
- Sphinx, also known as the Japanese ironclad Kōtetsu, an ironclad built for the Confederate States Navy, launched at Bordeaux in 1864
