= Hinchinbrooke (1780 ship) =

History

Spain
- Name: San Carlos
- Captured: 7 January 1780

Great Britain
- Name: Hinchinbrooke
- Owner: Robert Williams
- Acquired: 1780 by purchase of a prize
- Fate: Wrecked 10 April 1785

General characteristics
- Tons burthen: 528, or 52853/94 (bm)
- Length: Overall: 115 ft 10 in (35.3 m); Keel: 91 ft 3 in (27.8 m) (keel)
- Beam: 33 ft 0 in (10.1 m)
- Depth of hold: 13 ft 6 in (4.1 m)
- Complement: 200 (San Carlos)
- Armament: 32 guns (San Carlos)

Hinchinbrooke (or Hinchinbrook) was the Spanish ship San Carlos that Admiral Rodney's squadron captured on 8 January 1780. She was sold as a prize and in 1781 commenced a voyage as an "extra" ship of the British East India Company. During the voyage a French squadron captured her at the Battle of Porto Praya, but the British Royal Navy recaptured her within a day or so. She was lost in the Hooghly River in 1783 on her return voyage to Britain.

San Carlos: On 8 January 1780 a squadron under the command of Admiral Rodney encountered a convoy of 22 Spanish vessels some 76 leagues ENE of Cape Finisterre.

== Background ==
The convoy consisted of seven vessels and ships of war belonging to the Guipuzcoan Company of Caracas, and 15 merchantmen. One of the Company vessels was San Carlos, under the command of Captain Don Firmin Urtizberea. Rodney's squadron captured the entire Spanish convoy.

EIC voyage and loss: San Carlos arrived in the River Thames on 27 April 1780. There she was condemned in prize.

Robert Williams purchased San Carlos and renamed her Hinchinbrooke. He chartered her for a voyage to Bengal for the EIC, but first she underwent fitting and measuring by Barnard.

Captain Arthur Maxwell sailed from Portsmouth for Madras and Bengal on 13 March 1781.

On 16 April 1781 a French squadron under the Bailli de Suffren attacked a British squadron under Commodore George Johnstone anchored at Porto Praya (now Praia) in the Cape Verde Islands to take on water. Both squadrons were en route to the Cape of Good Hope, the British to take it from the Dutch, the French aiming to help defend it and French possessions in the Indian Ocean. The encounter was unexpected so neither fleet was prepared to do battle. The French ship Artésien captured Hinchinbrooke, but when the French withdrew from the inconclusive battle the prize crew abandoned her and the British recaptured her. Hinchinbrooke sailed on to Bengal.

Loss: Hinchinbrooke was wrecked on 10 April 1785 on the Long Sand, River Hooghly, as she was returning to Calcutta for repairs prior to resuming her return voyage to Britain. She had reached the mouth of the Bengal river when she encountered a violent storm. As she was returning to Kedgeree to refit she wrecked and three crew members drowned. The value of her cargo, which could not be saved, was reported as three (or six or seven) Lakhs, presumably of rupees.

== Bibliography ==
- Hackman, Rowan (2001). Ships of the East India Company. Gravesend, Kent: World Ship Society. ISBN 0-905617-96-7.
