= Achille de Trémigon =

- Born: 18 March 1732 Saint-Méloir, France
- Died: 16 April 1781 (aged 49)
- Branch: French Navy
- Rank: captain
- Conflicts: Battle of Porto Praya

Barthélemy Evrard Achille de Trémigon (Note: Or Barthélemy Édouard Achille.) (Saint-Méloir, 18 March 1732—Battle of Porto Praya, 16 April 1781) was a French Navy officer.

== Biography ==
Born to a family of sailors, he was brother to Charles Jean César de Trémigon. Trémigon started sailing with the French East India Company in 1751 and made five journeys to the Indian Ocean. He served as a lieutenant on Bien-Aimé (1757) in d'Aché's squadron, and later on Zodiaque, taking part in two battles in 1759, where he was gravely wounded.

D'Aché gave Trémigon command of Pénélope for missions in the Indian Ocean. In July 1761, he was promoted to capitaine de brûlot and made two cruises in the Caribbean (1761–1763) on Protée and Zodiaque. In 1763, he was wounded in the fire at the stores in Brest.

Promoted to Lieutenant de vaisseau (in May 1763), he took part in the bombardment of Larache and Salé on Licorne in 1765. In 1767, he captained the corvette Vigilant in the Indian Ocean and was tasked with importing spice plants from Moluques in 1769. He was promoted to Frigate captain in 1770 and introduced to the King.

In February 1772, Trémigon was promoted to captain, and given command of the 64-gun Alexandre, in the squadron under Orvilliers. In the night of 23 to 24, Alexandre got separated from the fleet, and thus failed to take part in the Battle of Ushant on 27 July 1778. Trémigon was admonished after the subsequent inquiry. The year after, he took part in the Armada of 1779.

In 1780, he was appointed to the brand-new 110-gun Invincible. In March 1781, he transferred to Annibal, part of a division under Suffren, bound for the Indian Ocean. He was killed en route during the Battle of Porto Praya on 16 April 1781.

== Sources and references ==
Notes

Bibliography

- Caron, François (1996). La guerre incomprise, ou, Le mythe de Suffren: la campagne en Inde, 1781-1783. Service historique de la marine. OCLC 463973942.
- Cunat, Charles (1852). Histoire du Bailli de Suffren. Rennes: A. Marteville et Lefas.
- Taillemite, Étienne (2002). Dictionnaire des Marins français. Tallandier. ISBN 2-84734-008-4. OCLC 606770323.
- Naval History Division (2019). Naval Documents of the American Revolution: American Theater: June 1, 1778–August 15, 1778; European Theater: June 1, 1778–August 15, 1778 (PDF). Vol. 13. United States: Department of the Navy.
