= French ship Sphinx (1776) =

French Navy 64-gun ship

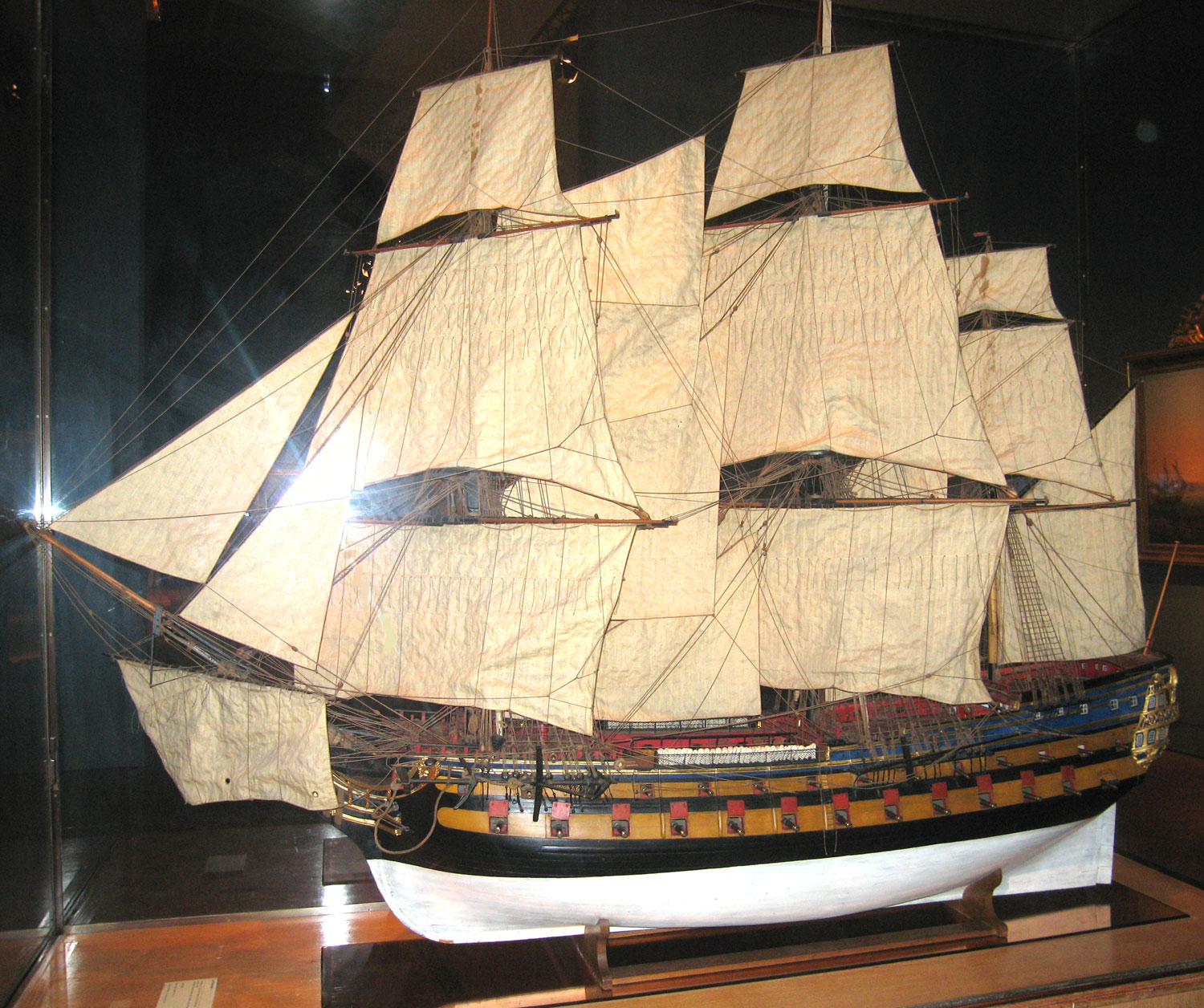
- Model of a 64-gun ship from the 1770s of the same type as Sphinx

History

France
- Name: Sphinx
- Builder: Brest, France
- Launched: 1776
- Fate: Hulked 1793

General characteristics
- Armament: 64 guns; 26 × 24-pounder guns; 28 × 12-pounder guns; 10 × 6-pounder guns

Sphinx was a two-deck 64 gun ship of the French Navy. She was built at Brest to plans by Ollivier Fils and launched in 1776. She took the name of a recently retired 64-gun ship with the same dimensions. She fought in the American War of Independence, most notably in Suffren's campaign in the Indian Ocean.

== Features ==
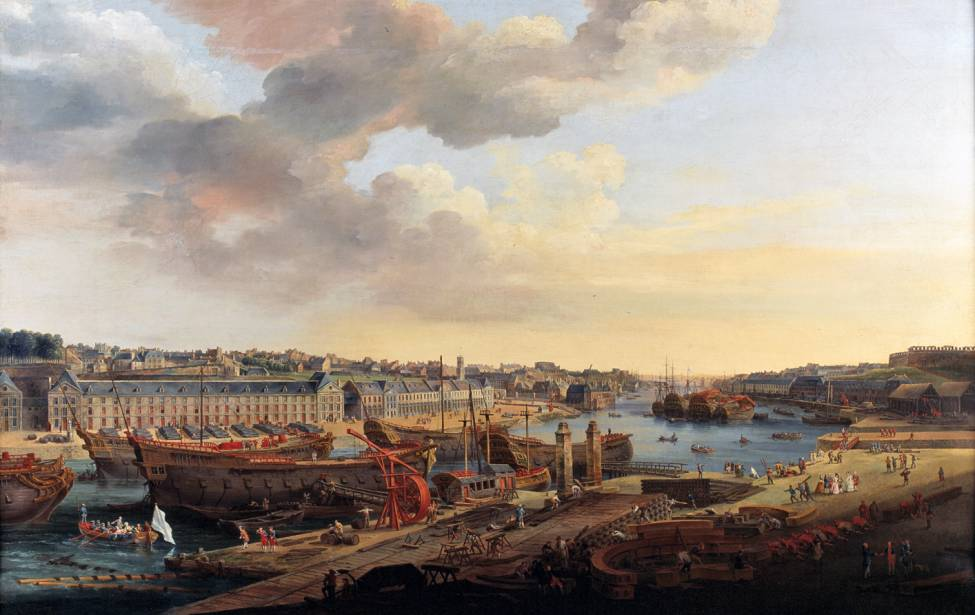
The Brest arsenal at the time of Sphinx's construction.

She was built according to norms laid down by French shipbuilders in the 1730s and 1740s which had aimed at a good combination of low cost and high manoeuvrability and armament, in the face of a numerically-superior British Royal Navy. The first 64-gun ship of her type was launched in 1735, followed by dozens of others until the end of the 1770s, a decade in which they were definitively outclassed by 74-gun ships.

As with all French warships of this era, she had an oak hull, pine masts and hemp ropes and sails. She not only carried fewer guns than a 74-gun ship, her 64 iron guns were of lower caliber:

- Twenty-six 24-pounder guns on one gun deck
- Twenty-eight 12-pounder guns on her other gun deck
- Ten six-pounder guns on her forecastle and aftcastle

Each gun had a reserve of around 50 to 60 shot as well as bar shot and grape shot.

She could also carry enough fresh water to feed her crew for two to three months and enough provisions to feed them for five to six months without calling at a port. This included wine, vinegar, oil, flour, condiments, cheese, fruits, dry vegetables and even livestock which would be butchered on board.

== History ==
=== American War of Independence (1775–1783) ===
Sphinx fought as part of Louis Guillouet d'Orvilliers's fleet against Augustus Keppel's force at the Battle of Ushant on 27 July 1778, captained by comte de Soulanges. She formed part of the Blue Squadron, the rear guard commanded by Louis-Philippe d'Orléans, duc de Chartres.

In 1780 she joined Guichen's squadron sent to fight in the Antilles. On 17 April 1780, still captained by the comte de Soulanges, she fought in the Battle of Martinique in the West Indies. She and the rest of the squadron then returned to France.

In 1781 she joined Suffren's small force, sent to fight in the Indian Ocean. On 16 April she fought in the French victory at the Battle of Porto Praya. Afterwards she took the badly damaged Annibal in tow. She was then stationed off the Cape of Good Hope for a few weeks to take on board reinforcements heading for Mauritius Island.

Between 1782 and 20 June 1783, Sphinx was an engaged in Suffren's five battles in the Bay of Bengal and off Sri Lanka - the battles of Sadras (17 February 1782), Providien (12 April 1782), Negapatam (6 July 1782), Trincomalee (August and September 1782) and Cuddalore (20 June 1783).

At the Battle of Providien, Sphinx, under Captain du Chilleau, was fourth in the French line, behind Petit Annibal (Captain de Morard de Galles). She came within pistol range of his opposite number, HMS Burford (Captain Peter Rainier) before opening fire. She sustained casualties, with over 20 killed, including Lieutenant Anerchiesna and Lieutenant de Bourdeille, and about 75 wounded, including Ensign d'Aigremont.

During this campaign she captured the troop transport Raikes on 6 June 1782 and HMS Resolution three days later. She also took Héros in tow after the latter was dismasted at the Battle of Trincomalee.

After the war, Sphinx sailed to Isle de France for a refit. Her captain, Du Chilleau, claimed that the cannonballs removed from her hull filled six longboats.

=== Final years ===
She returned to France for a refit in 1784 and was then posted to the Rochefort squadron. She was barely ten years old but had already been outclassed - the American War of Independence had shown that she and her type were not powerful enough and the naval ministry had already begun to prioritise building 74-gun ships, a drive that came to its final fruition with the designs of Borda and Sané. When war broke out with Britain again in 1793, Sphinx was turned into a floating battery with twelve 36-pounder guns, four-16-pounder howitzers, six swivel guns, and two mortars. Sphinx is also recorded as a hulk in Rochefort in 1793 and disappeared from the navy lists in 1802.

== Bibliography ==
- Acerra, Martine; Zysberg, André (1997). L'essor des marines de guerre européennes: vers 1680–1790. Regards sur l'histoire (in French). Paris: SEDES. ISBN 2-7181-9515-0. (notice BnF no FRBNF36697883)
- Du Chilleau, Alex (1815). Au Roi. Exposé des services du contre-amiral Mis Du Chilleau (in French). Paris: Leblanc.
- Meyer, Jean; Acerra, Martine (1994). Histoire de la marine française: des origines à nos jours (in French). Rennes: éditions Ouest-France. ISBN 2-7373-1129-2. (notice BnF no FRBNF35734655)
- Vergé-Franceschi, Michel (2002). Dictionnaire d'histoire maritime. Bouquins (in French). Paris: éditions Robert Laffont. ISBN 2-221-08751-8. et ISBN 2-221-09744-0 (notice BnF no FRBNF38825325)
