= 107th Infantry Regiment (France) =

- 107e régiment d'infanterie
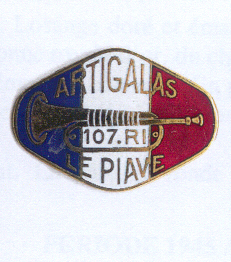
- Regimental insignia of the 107th infantry regiment
- Active: 1469–1989
- Country: France France
- Allegiance: French Armed Forces
- Branch: French Army
- Type: Infantry regiment
- Role: Infantry
- Garrison/HQ: Angoulême
- Colors: Red, White, Blue
- Anniversaries: Saint Maurice celebrated 29 June (formed 1794)
- Decorations: Croix de guerre 1914–1918

Flag of the regiment. It wears, stitched in gold letters in its folds, the above entries.

The 107th Infantry Regiment (107e régiment d'infanterie; shortened to 107e RI or "107th RI") was a French Army infantry regiment that dates back to 1469, where it was originally created as the Francs Archers Angoumois. In 1755, the Augoumois battalion was stationed in Louisiana on a harbor defense mission. The regiment was later stationed—similarly—on a mission in 1772 led by the Pondicherry regiment in India. The 107th was one of many regiments created under the Ancient Regime to serve on board naval ships and in the colonies, and subsequently, all such regiments were—in 1791—given a number in the line-infantry order of battle. This means that the 107th could be considered as "ancestors" of the naval infantry regiments.

They are:

- "La Marine" from ""Compagnies ordinaires de la mer"" (lit. "ordinary companies of the sea"), created in 1622 and became 11th Infantry Regiment
- "Royal-Vaisseaux" which dates from 1638 and became the 43rd Infantry Regiment
- "La Couronne" created in 1643 and became 45th Infantry Regiment
- "Royal-Marine" created in 1669 and became the 60th Infantry Regiment
- "Amirauté" created in 1669
- "Cap" created in 1766 and became 106th Infantry Regiment
- "Pondichéry" created in 1772; white uniform with orange facings. Became 107th Infantry Regiment
- "Île de France, Île de Bourbon, & Port Louis; established in 1772 for the defense of the Mascarene Islands. Merged into the Île de France in 1775; uniform was white with blue facings. In 1776 Bourbon regained its separate identity. Île de France became the 108th Infantry Regiment
- "Martinique et Guadeloupe" created in 1772 and became 109th Infantry Regiment
- "Port-au-Prince" created in 1773 and became 110th Infantry Regiment

The regiment was set up in 1772. It was disbanded and re-established many times throughout the years before finally dissolving in 1989.

== Outline and changes to name ==
- 1469: creation of the Francs Archers of Angoumois
- 1772: creation of the Régiment de Pondichéry
- 1791: renamed 107th Infantry Regiment
- 1794: renamed 107th Demi-Brigade of Battle
- 1798: renamed 107th Demi-Brigade Line
- 1803: dissolved
- 1814: re-created under the name of 107th Infantry Regiment of the Line
- 1815: dissolved
- 1870: re-created of the 107th Infantry Regiment of the Line
- 1882: renamed 107th Infantry Regiment
- 1914: mobilized, reserve regiment set up, the 107+200 = 307th Infantry Regiment
- 1940: dissolved
- 1944: re-created
- 1945: dissolved
- 1963: creation of the 107th Infantry Battalion
- 1964: dissolved
- 1980: re-created reserve regiment of 22nd Infantry Regiment of Marines
- 1989: dissolved

== Colonel/Chef de brigade ==
- unknown – 6 November 1914: Colonel Jacquot
- 1939: Lieutenant-Colonel Laffont

== Battles ==
=== Ancien Régime ===
- During the French Revolution, the regiment Pondicherry suffered the fate of many royal regiments: It was disbanded and then reconstituted in 1792 under the name 107th.

=== Wars of the Revolution and the Empire ===
- 1794–1795: Netherlands
- 1795–1796: War in the Vendée
- 1799: Italian campaign

- garrison at Mont-Dauphin (this place being particularly isolated and depressing, 800 men of the 74th and 107th demi-brigades deserted their posts, abandoning their flags and their equipment.)

- 1808: Army of Portugal – Peninsular War
- 1813: German campaign

16–19 October: Battle of Leipzig

- 1814: Campaign of France (1814)
- 1815: Hundred Days campaign

=== 1815–1848 ===
- Present at Waterloo on 18 June 1815 when they lost 15 officers, including its colonel. It is dissolved in the Second French Restoration.

=== Second Empire ===
- The 107th did reunite on the occasion of the War of 1870 under the name of the 18th Regiment. It is integrated into the Armée de la Loire, They fought desperately through the winter of 1870–1871; after this campaign, the Charentais had lost 689 men (killed or missing).

1870–1871: Siege of Paris

=== 1870–1914 ===
- 1871–1875: Pacification operations in Kabylie, Algeria
- 1881–1883: South Tunisia

=== World War I ===
In 1914, the 107th shared barracks at Angoulême with the 46th Infantry Brigade, 23rd Infantry Division, and 12th Army Corps. The 107th was part of the 23rd Infantry Division from August 1914 to November 1918. They participated in the Battle of the Marne, Artois and the Somme.

In 1916, the 107th was assigned to defend Verdun. After the mission, they immediately proceeded, during the rigorous winter of 1916–1917, to Champagne. In October 1917, following the disaster of Caporetto, the whole 23rd Infantry Division and 12th Army Corps became part of the Tenth Army, known as the "French Expeditionary Force" responsible for plugging the breach opened by the Austrians on the Italian front. It was during this campaign on October 26, 1918, that the 107th managed a daring crossing of the Piave. The bugler Artagilas died getting hit by a bullet in the forehead when he rang the charge of the 2nd battalion and subs.

Your regiment is admirable, no one in the French Army would have done better.

— General commanding the 12th Army Corps, 1914.

Elite Regiment, which has demonstrated the moral qualities of the highest order.

— Unknown 1918.

=== Interwar period ===
The 107th RI was stationed in Angouleme in January 1939, when they were required to implement the plan de barrage (lit. "plan of the dam") in the Pyrénées-Orientales. The plan aimed to prevent the soldiers of the Spanish Republican Army, defeated by the Francoist rebels, in full retreat (or Retirada in Spanish), to go to France. The prohibition to enter ceased from 5 February to 9 February of that year.

=== World War II ===
==== Battle of France ====
In 1939, the 107th Infantry Regiment, under the command of lieutenant-colonel Laffont, was integrated into the 23rd Infantry Division. On August 24, 1939, the 107th left the barracks Gaspard-Michel for Lorraine where it participated in one of the few offensive actions of the "Phoney War", that of Sare. The 107th RI embarked on the Somme and the Crozat Canal where from 18 to 30 May 1940, the Germans are content, but after the fall of Dunkirk and the resumption of the Wehrmacht on the Somme, the regiment was forced to retreat on June 7 order, first on the Oise and the Marne, where it continued to fight. Under pressure from the enemy, it found itself in Châteauroux where, having retained its cohesion, it is organized to defend the city. The armistice with Germany was signed, and the regiment was once again dissolved, this time on 21 August 1940.

==== Liberation of France ====
The 107th RI was re-established in 1944 and participated in the liberation of France. It was once again dissolved in 1945. In spring 1945, the unit was attached to the Army commanded by General Larminat and responsible for the reduction of pockets of German resistance on the Atlantic coast. It was assigned to the reconquest of the tip of the Coubre.

In Royan, the 107th RI was attached to the southern group of Colonel Adeline under the Frugier group. April 14, 1945, in the Royan pocket, in a "vulnerable operation," the regiment attacked towards Meschers and Talmont. On April 15, the regiment moved towards the Compin and dropped Suzac, focusing on the German fortifications. It held the position until the fall of Royan.

=== 1945 to 1989 ===
The 107th was briefly restored in 1963 as the 107th Infantry Battalion, then reborn in 1980 as a reserve regiment of the 22nd Marine Infantry Regiment. In 1989, the 107th was—once again—disbanded indefinitely.

== Refrain ==
Allons 107, il faut partir sans courir. (lit. "Come, 107th, we must go without running.")

== Notable members ==
- Sergeant Ignace Hoff during the Siege of Paris
- Captain George Gaudy, writer of two wars (see Combats sans gloire, lit. "Inglorious Battles")

== Citations and references ==
Citations

References

- Andolenko (General, ret.), Serge (1969). À partir du Recueil d'Historiques de l'Infanterie Française [From the Historical Collection of the French Infantry] (in French). Eurimprim.
- Gaudy, Georges (1941). Combats sans gloire [Inglorious Battles] (in French). Lyon, France: Editions Lardanchet.
- McAteer, William (1991) Rivals in Eden: A history of the French settlement and British conquest of the Seychelles islands. (Sussex: Book Guild). ISBN 978-0863324963
- nithart.com C'est le Service Historique de l'Armée de Terre au Château de Vincennes. (lit. "This is the History Department of the Army at the Château de Vincennes.") – archives at the Château de Vincennes
