= François Caron (French Navy officer) =

- Born: 6 August 1937
- Service / branch: French Navy
- Rank: contre-amiral

François Michel Marie Ignace Caron (b. 6 August 1937) is a French Navy officer and historian.

== Biography ==
Caron was born to the family of a Navy captain, and joined the École navale in 1957.

He captained several submarines before becoming first officer on the missile destroyer Duquesne, and later captain of the T 53-class destroyer La Galissonnière.

He retired with the rank of contre-amiral.

== Works ==
- Caron, François (1983). La Guerre incomprise ou les raison d'un échec (capitulation de Louisbourg). Service historique de la marine. ISBN 9782110911360. OCLC 879045239.
- Caron, François (1989). La Victoire volée - Bataille de la Chesapeake. Service historique de la marine. OCLC 23254405.
- Caron, François (1996). La guerre incomprise, ou, Le mythe de Suffren: la campagne en Inde, 1781-1783. Service historique de la marine. OCLC 463973942.
- Van Hille, Jean-Marc; Caron, François (1998). Les vicissitudes d'un marin provençal, le contre-amiral Jean-Gaspard Vence. Preface by contre-amiral François Caron. Service historique de la marine. OCLC 572778855.

== Sources and references ==
Notes

Citations
