= Battle of Porto Praya =

1781 battle of the American Revolutionary War

- Part of the American Revolutionary War
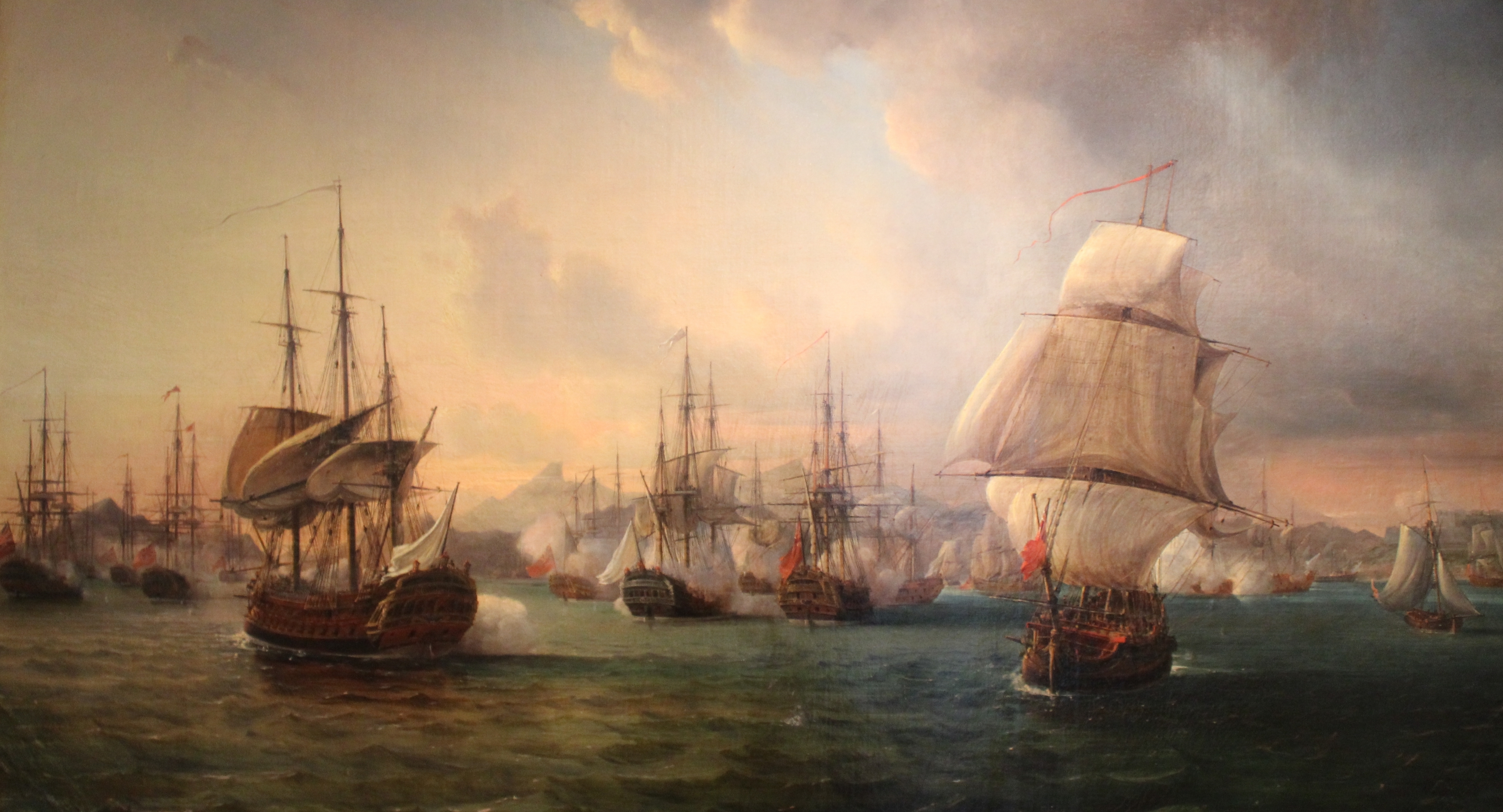
- 1836 painting of the battle
Date	16 April 1781
Location	Off Porto Praya, Atlantic Ocean 14°54′26.27″N 23°30′17.66″W
Result	Inconclusive

Belligerents
Great Britain	France

Commanders and leaders
George Johnstone	Pierre André de Suffren

Strength
5 ships of the line 3 frigates 2 cutters 1 bomb vessel 1 fireship 2 hired armed vessels 4 troopships 1 storeship 13 merchant ships	5 ships of the line

Casualties and losses
36 killed 147 wounded 1 fireship captured 1 storeship captured 2 merchant ships captured	93 killed 217 wounded

The Battle of Porto Praya was fought on 16 April 1781 during the American Revolutionary War between a Royal Navy fleet under Commodore George Johnstone and a French Navy squadron under Pierre André de Suffren. Both the British and French were en route to the Dutch Cape Colony, the former to capture it and the latter to help defend it before proceeding to France's colonies in the Indian Ocean. The British had anchored at Porto Praya in neutral Portuguese-held Cape Verde to take on water, when the French squadron arrived and violated Portuguese neutrality by attacking them at anchor.

Due to the unexpected nature of the encounter, neither the British nor French were prepared to do battle, and in the inconclusive engagement that followed Suffren's squadron sustained more damage than Johnstone's fleet, though no ships were lost. Johnstone tried to pursue the French, but was forced to call it off in order to repair the damage his ships had taken. The French gained a strategic victory, because Suffren beat Johnstone to the Cape Colony and reinforced its garrison before continuing on his journey to the French colony of Isle de France.

== Background ==
France had entered the American Revolutionary War in 1778, and Britain declared war on the Dutch Republic in late 1780, when the Dutch refused to stop trading with the French and the Americans. Commodore George Johnstone was ordered to lead an expedition to capture the Dutch Cape Colony. On 13 March 1781 Johnstone sailed from Spithead with a fleet of 37 ships, including five ships of the line, three frigates, and a large number of transport ships. In early April Johnstone's fleet anchored in the neutral harbour of Porto Praya in Portuguese-held Cape Verde to take on water and supplies; Johnstone believed the French would not attack his force there as doing so would violate Portuguese neutrality.

Suffren had been dispatched on a mission to provide military assistance to French and Dutch colonies in India, leading a squadron of five ships of the line, seven transports, and a corvette to escort the transports. On 22 March he had sailed in the company of a squadron destined for North America under Admiral de Grasse, with word of Johnstone's mission and an objective to reach the Cape first. One of Suffren's ships, Artésien, had originally been destined for America, and was in need of water, so the French squadron paused when it approached Santiago on 16 April, and Suffren ordered Artésien to reconnoitre the harbour.

== Battle ==
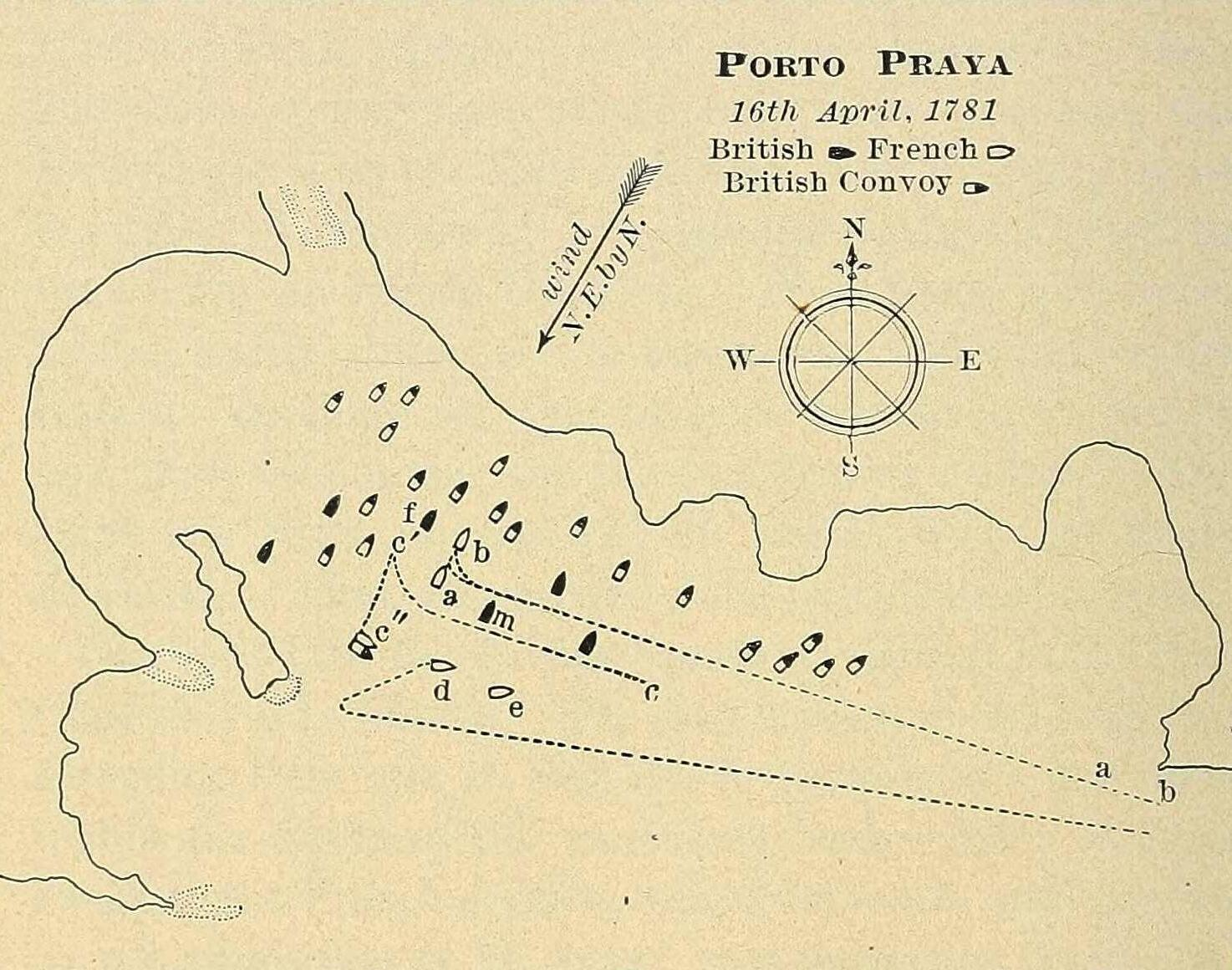
Map of the battle

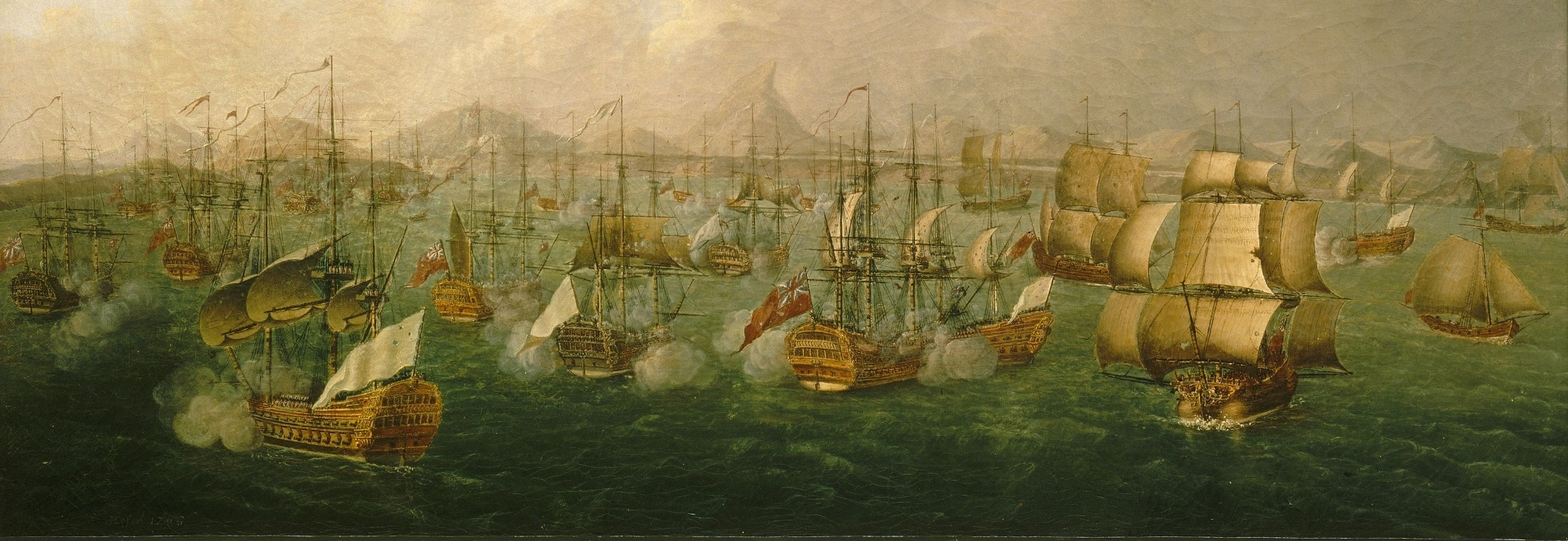
Painting of the battle by Rossel de Cercy

When Artésien reached the mouth of Porto Praya's harbour, she spotted Johnstone's fleet at anchor and signalled Suffren that enemy ships were in sight. Suffren, correctly assuming that the British fleet had men ashore and would be in some disarray, immediately gave orders to attack, violating Portuguese neutrality; he led the attack with his flagship Héros. Johnstone, who was in the process of ordering ship manoeuvres to separate ships that had drifted too close to one another when the French squadron was spotted, scrambled to prepare his ships for battle.

Suffren's orders were for his line to anchor before the British fleet and open fire. This he did with Héros, taking on Hero and Monmouth, the two largest British ships. Annibal soon came to his aid, and eventually drew most of the fire. Artésien, whose captain was killed early in the engagement, captured the East Indiaman Hinchinbrooke in the confusion, and then a breeze blew her away from the action. Vengeur passed along the anchored British fleet exchanging broadsides but never anchored herself and passed out of the action, while Sphinx also failed to anchor, and only contributed minimally to the action.

Suffren, with the advantage of surprise, maintained the action with the two anchored ships for ninety minutes until damage (Annibal lost two of three masts) led him to signal a retreat while maintaining fire. Annibal lost her third mast on her way out of the harbour, and was slow to follow Héros. The French captured the East Indiamen Hinchinbrook and Fortitude, the fireship Infernal and the storeship Edward. The British however recaptured them all over the next few days.

== Aftermath ==
Suffren gathered his squadron together outside the harbour to assess damage and make repairs. Terror and Infernal had got out to sea and the French fired on them. Despite being set on fire, Terror escaped and her crew extinguished the flames. The French captured Infernal and her captain Master and Commander Henry D'Esterre Darby along with a number of other British military personnel and civilian sailors.

Johnstone got his fleet ready and came out of the harbour in pursuit about three hours later. Suffren adopted an aggressive line, and Johnstone, some of whose ships — especially Isis — had suffered significant damage, chose not to renew the battle, and returned to the harbour to effect repairs. However, before he returned, he succeeded in recovering Infernal. Her remaining crew had recaptured her while the prize crew were off their guard. Alternatively, her prize crew abandoned her at the approach of the British fleet. Their prize crews also abandoned Hinchinbrook and Edward, and the British recovered the vessels a few days later.

Suffren's squadron reached the Cape Colony on 21 June, with the troop convoys arriving nine days later. After spending a month there for repair and refit, he left 500 troops at the Cape Colony and proceeded on to the French colony of Isle de France. Johnstone, however, still headed for the Cape Colony and arrived in July and captured five Dutch East Indiamen at Saldanha Bay on 21 July. He subsequently returned to England with his fleet.

== Order of battle ==
Captain Suffren's squadron
Ship	Guns	Commander	Casualties			Notes
Ship	Guns	Commander	Killed	Wounded	Total	Notes
Héros	74	Captain Pierre André de Suffren; Captain Félix d'Hesmivy de Moissac	23	87	110	Damaged
Annibal	74	Captain Achille de Trémigon †	70	130	200	Damaged and dismasted. First officer Morard de Galles and Lieutenant Huon de Kermadec wounded.
Artésien	64	Captain Paul de Cardaillac de Lomné †				
Vengeur	64	Captain Charles Gaspard Hyacinthe de Forbin La Barben				
Sphinx	64	Captain Charles Louis du Chilleau de La Roche				
Casualties: 93 killed, 217 wounded, 310 total

Three frigates, the corvette Fortune, and numerous transports did not engage.

British fleet
Ship	Guns	Commander	Casualties			Notes
Ship	Guns	Commander	Killed	Wounded	Total	Notes
HMS Hero	74	Captain James Hawker				
HMS Monmouth	64	Captain James Alms				
HMS Isis	50	Captain Evelyn Sutton				
HMS Jupiter	50	Captain Thomas Pasley				
HMS Romney	50	Commodore George Johnstone; Captain Roddam Home				
HMS Jason	32	Captain James Pigott				
HMS Active	32	Captain Thomas Mackenzie				
HMS Diana	32	Captain Sir William Burnaby				
HMS Lark	14	Lieutenant Philippe d'Auvergne				
HMS Infernal	8	Commander Henry D'Esterre Darby				
HMS Terror	8	Commander Charles Wood				
HMS Rattlesnake	14	Commander Peter Clements				
HMS Porto	16	Commander Thomas Charles Lumley				
San Carlos	20	Commander John Boyle				Armed ship
Pondicherry	20	Lieutenant Thomas Saunders Grove				Armed transport
Royal Charlotte	20	Commander Thomas Stanhope Bennett				Hired armed ship

=== Armed transports ===
- Lord Townsend
- Manilla
- Porpoise

=== Storeships ===
- Edward

=== East Indiamen ===
- Asia
- Chapman
- Essex
- Fortitude (Captain Grigory)
- Hastings
- Hinchinbrook
- Latham
- Locko
- Lord North
- Osterley
- Queen
- Southampton
- Valentine

== Legacy ==
The Agosta-class submarine La Praya (S 622) was named in honour of the battle.
