= French ship Annibal (1778) =

Ship of the line of the French Navy

- Achille (left) being dismasted by HMS Brunswick at the Glorious First of June

History

France
- Name: Annibal
- Builder: Brest
- Laid down: December 1777
- Launched: 5 October 1778
- In service: January 1779
- Renamed: Achille, 1786
- Captured: 1 June 1794 by Royal Navy

Great Britain
- Name: Achille
- Commissioned: never commissioned
- Fate: Broken up, 1796

General characteristics
- Class & type: Annibal-class ship of the line
- Displacement: 2,939 tonneaux
- Tons burthen: 1,478 port tonneaux
- Length: 54.7 m (179 ft 6 in)
- Beam: 14.3 m (46 ft 11 in)
- Draught: 7.2 m (23 ft 7 in)
- Propulsion: Sails
- Armament: 74 guns of various weights of shot

Annibal was a 74-gun ship of the line of the French Navy, lead ship of her class. She was designed by Jacques-Noël Sané, and was one of the earliest of his works. She was built at Brest in 1778.

== Career ==
=== American theatre in the War of American Independence ===
Annibal sailed out to the West Indies and took part in the Battle of Grenada under Lamotte-Picquet. In the Battle of Martinique, on 18 December 1779, Annibal single-handedly engaged seven ships of the line to protect a convoy, and withdrew without anyone being killed aboard. Annibal later took part in the action of 20 March 1780.

=== Indian theatre in the War of American Independence ===
She was then sent out to the East Indies under Suffren. Fortune and Annibal were the only two ships in the squadron not to have a copper sheathing.

At the Battle of Porto Praya, her captain, Achille de Trémigon, failed to understand Suffren's intentions to illegally attack the British fleet without consideration for the Portuguese neutrality, and followed Héros into the harbour unprepared for battle. Trémigon was killed by a cannonball that struck his leg, and First Officer Morard de Galles assumed command. After the battle, Suffren gave command of Annibal to Captain Bernard Boudin de Tromelin.

Sadras, Providien, Negapatam and Trincomalee in 1782 under Captain de Tromelin. The following year, she fought at the battle of Cuddalore under Captain d'Aymar.

Annibal was renamed to Achille in 1786 to prevent confusion with Petit Annibal.

=== French revolutionary wars ===
Achille served with the French Navy until 1794, when she was captured by the Royal Navy during the battle of the Glorious First of June. She was commissioned into the Royal Navy as the third-rate HMS Achille, retaining the French spelling of the name. However, she was in a poor state and was broken up at Plymouth in 1796, just two years after her capture.
