= Action of 10 September 1782 =

- Part of the American Revolutionary War
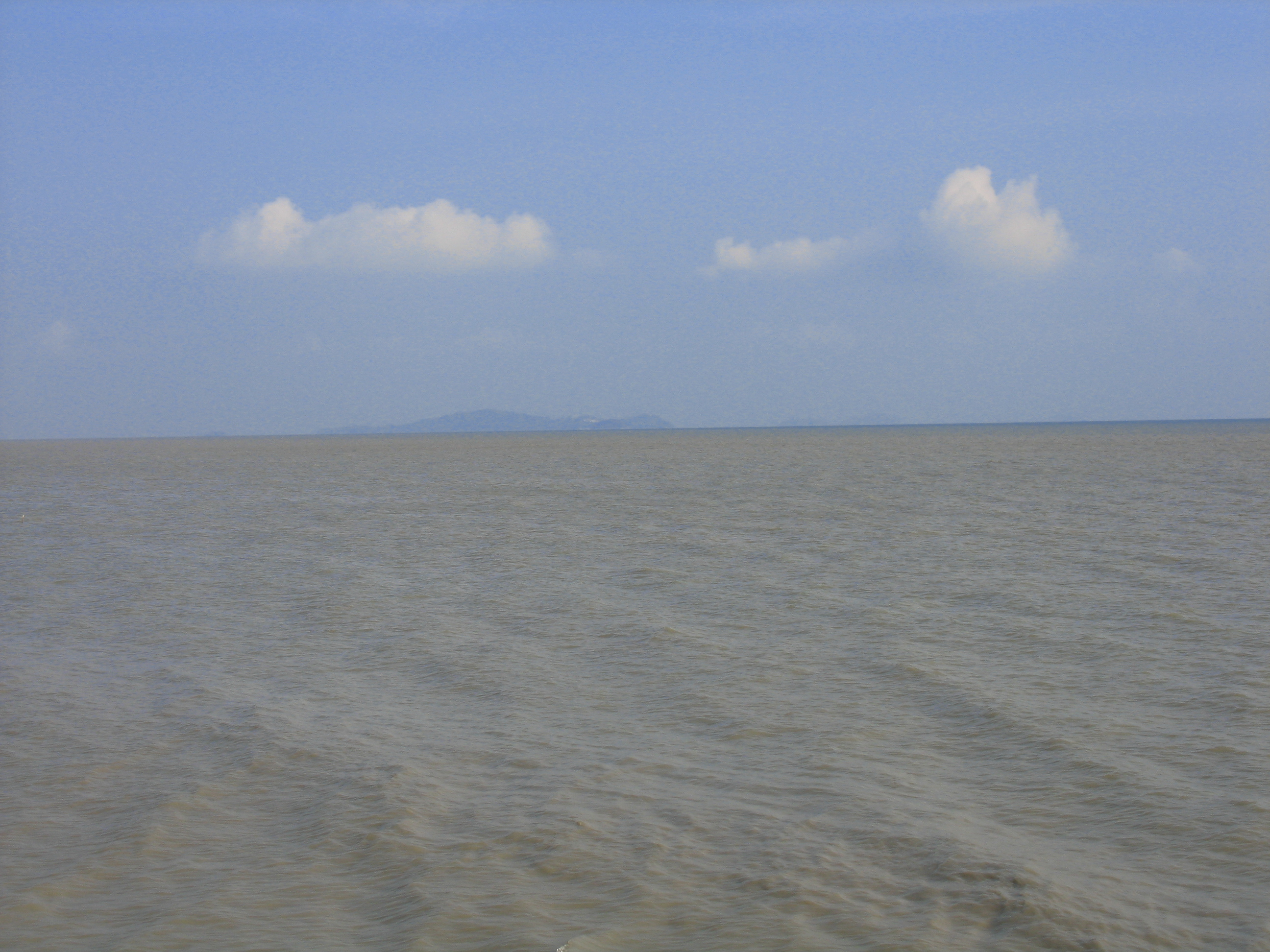
- Present-day view of the Strait of Malacca
Date	10 September 1782
Location	Off Pisang Island, Strait of Malacca 1°28′03″N 105°15′17″E
Result	Indecisive

Belligerents
East India Company	France

Commanders and leaders
Patrick Lawson	Jacques Boudin de Tromelin

Strength
5 merchantmen	1 frigate

Casualties and losses
2 killed	4 killed

The action of 10 September 1782 was a minor engagement between five merchant vessels — four East Indiamen of the British East India Company and a country-ship — on the one side, and a French frigate on the other. The action resulted in only a few casualties and was inconclusive. What was noteworthy was that the Indiamen sought out the French man-of-war and attacked it; it would have been more usual for the merchantmen to have avoided combat as they had little to gain from a battle.

== Background ==
Since at least the mid-18th Century, and to a great degree even earlier, the East India Company would annually send a fleet of Indiamen from England to trade with India, South East Asia, and China. The vessels would generally, and particularly during wartime, stay together for mutual protection and support to the Cape of Good Hope, and then sail independently, or in smaller groups, to Bombay, Madras, Bengal (Calcutta), and on. During wartime the Royal Navy would often provide warships to escort the fleet well into the Atlantic, and possibly as far as St Helena. Country ships, i.e., ships based in India, some sailing for the Company, some independent, might join up in India with vessels going on to China, again for mutual protection against pirates, and in wartime privateers and enemy vessels.

On the homeward journey, the vessels that had gone to China would return in convoy, generally stopping at St Helena to pick up escorts back to England. Frequently other vessels, such as whalers returning from the South Seas fisheries, might join at St Helena too.

The British vessels involved in the action of 9 September 1782 had sailed from Portsmouth on 13 March 1781, bound for Bombay and China as part of a convoy of Indiamen accompanying a British squadron under Commodore George Johnstone. At about the same time, a French squadron under the command of Bailli de Suffren left France. Both squadrons were sailing for the Cape of Good Hope, the British to take it from the Dutch, the French aiming to help defend it and French possessions in the Indian Ocean, including Rodriguez Island, Ile Bourbon (Réunion), Île de France (Mauritius), and Pondicherry. The two squadrons, including the Indiamen, met in the battle of Porto Praya. Though the battle was inconclusive, it did enable the French to forestall the British attack on the Cape.

The British sailed on to the Cape, where Johnstone captured five Dutch East Indiamen at the battle of Saldanha Bay. The British Indiamen then sailed on, directly, or indirectly, to India.

== The action ==
On 8 August 1782 the Indiamen Asia, Essex, Locko, and Osterley, and the country ship Shah Byram Gore, left Bombay, bound for China. (Note: The spelling of the country ship's name varies, sometimes being given as Byram Gore, and sometimes as Byramgore, and preceded, or not, by Shah, Shaw, or Shy. She was a ship launched at Bombay Dockyard in 1775 that was lost in 1785. She provides the cover illustration to the book by Bulley (2000), which also has some information on her and her successors, all named for a legendary king of Persia. The cover illustration suggests that she was three-masted, and armed with 18 guns.) The captains were Patrick Lawson of Locko, who was the senior captain, Samuel Rodgers of Osterley, Robert Maw of Asia, Arthur Morris of Essex, (Note: Cotton identifies the captain of Locko as Peter Lawson, not Patrick. However, Company records and other sources, including a court case, confirm the name as Patrick.) and Maugham of Shah Byram Gore.

As the squadron was sailing through the Strait of Malacca on 6 September, it sighted a Malay vessel at anchor by the shore near Mount Formosa (1°49′N 102°55′E), some 40 miles southeast of Malacca. The captain of the Malay vessel reported that there was a French frigate and two brigs anchored at Pisang Island, and that the captain of the frigate had asked him if he had seen five ships coming from Bombay. This intelligence led Lawson to believe that the French were cruising, looking for his squadron, but did not believe themselves stronger than the Indiamen.

On 9 September the ships encountered the 38-gun French frigate Pourvoyeuse, which was under the command of Lieutenant J. M. Boudin de Tromelin. (Note: Tromelin was the younger brother of Captain B. M. Boudin de Tromelin, who in 1779 had captured the previous Osterley.) That evening Locko and Pourvoyeuse came quite close, but no engagement ensured. Locko did fire on and take possession of a Malay sloop that he feared the French captain had dispatched to summon the two brigs that had been reported accompanying the frigate.

The engagement began at 10 minutes past 2 p.m. on 10 September, when Pourvoyeuse opened fire with her bow chasers. Locko, Osterley, and Shah Byram Gore were closest but withheld their fire. When Pourvoyeuse fired her broadside at Locko, Lawson responded with a broadside. The engagement lasted some two-and-a-half hours, with Locko and Osterley bearing the brunt of it. Although Asia and Essex did fire on Pourvoyeuse, Lawson tried to keep them out of the battle as felt they were weakly manned, with a large portion of their crews being lascars.

Towards dusk, the two opponents separated. Locko pursued Pourvoyeuse, whose two 18-pounder stern guns took away some of Locko's rigging. At about 8p.m. Pourvoyeuse extinguished her lights and steered towards Malacca. At 8:15 Lawson gave up the chase, which would have taken the squadron in the opposite direction from China, and signalled to his squadron to resume their voyage. Locko brought up the rear as they sailed, so that should Pourvoyeuse wish to resume the action Locko would be the first vessel she would encounter.

== Outcome ==
On the British side, Osterley had two men killed, and Locko and Essex had several men injured from exploding cartridges. Pourvoyeuse had four seamen killed, and two officers and several seamen wounded.

Pourvoyeuse withdrew, sailing for Malacca where she could take shelter under the guns of the Dutch fort there. On 26 December she arrived at Trincomalee, which the French under Bailli de Suffren had captured from the British at the battle of Trincomalee on 3 September 1782, having left him and his squadron at Aceh, where they were wintering. At Trincomalee the memorist William Hickey met Tromelin. Later, Hickey described Pourvoyeuse as "Almost tumbling to pieces, and in want of every kind of stores." (Note: Hickey and his wife were travelling on the Portuguese merchant vessel Rainha de Portugal from Lisbon. Rainha became caught in a terrible storm off the Malabar Coast that killed thirteen of her crew. She put into Trincomalee harbour on 30 November, not knowing that the French had captured the port. The French later seized Rainha de Portugal on a pretext.)

The British: Lawson considered pursuing Pourvoyeuse but decided that doing so might take too long. As it was late in the sailing season, if the British vessels lost their passage to China there was no friendly port where they could winter. He lamented the lost opportunity to capture Pourvoyeuse, believing that if there had been one more hour of light he would have been able to capture her. The five British vessels sailed on to China, where they arrived safely in early October.

After the return to Britain of the four captains of the Indiamen, the East India Company awarded them prizes. Robert Maw received a silver salver made in 1787 by Joseph Heriot, of London, and inscribed "The Gift of the Hon’ble East India Company to Robert Maw Esq’r Commander of the Asia East Indiaman for gallantly defending the said ship against a French frigate of 44 guns in the Straights of Malacca September, 1782." We can safely assume that Arthur Morris received a similar piece of plate. We do not know what Samuel Rogers received, or if Patrick Lawson even received anything as by 1787 he had fled Britain for India to escape a fine of £100,000 for having smuggled goods back to Britain on Locko.

The French: Upon his return, Tromelin suffered the scorn of Suffren, who blamed him for failing to press his attack on the East Indiamen. Suffren repeatedly accused Tromelin of "disgracing the flag", (Note: M. de Lanuguy, dont la manoeuvre était l'objet des plaisanteries des matelots, qui en ce genre n'ont pas la main légère, offrit son journal à M. de Suffren; et, quoiqu'on doive présumer qu'il eût cherché à y atténuer sa faiblesse, le général, discourant peu, louant en peu de mots et blâmant de même, lui dit de sa voix nasillarde, en le lui remettant le lendemain : « Eh bien! M. de Lanuguy, eh bien! je persiste à dire que vous avez entaché le pavillon ») but when he offered to resign, Suffren refused.
