= Pisang Island =

Pisang Island (Pulau Pisang) may refer to:

- Pisang Island (Maluku), one of the Banda Islands in Maluku Province, Indonesia
- Pisang Island (Lampung), in Lampung Province, Indonesia
- Pisang Island (Johor), situated off the western coast of the Malaysian state of Johor
  - Pisang Island Lighthouse
