= Busbridge (1782 EIC ship) =

British East Indiaman 1782–1805

History

Great Britain
- Name: Busbridge
- Namesake: Busbridge
- Owner: EIC voyages 1-6: Robert Preston; EIC voyage 7:Samuel Dobrée
- Operator: British East India Company
- Builder: Perry, Blackwall
- Launched: 28 January 1782, or 1781
- Fate: Broken up 1805

General characteristics
- Tons burthen: 771, 77160/94, or 788 (bm)
- Length: 143 ft 10 in (43.8 m) (overall); 116 ft 9 in (35.6 m) (keel)
- Beam: 35 ft 3 in (10.7 m)
- Depth of hold: 14 ft 9 in (4.5 m)
- Propulsion: Sail
- Complement: 1793: 85; 1793:99; 1796:70
- Armament: 1793: 12 × 12-pounder guns; 1793: 26 × 12&6&4-pounder guns; 1796: 26 × 4&9-pounder guns
- Notes: Three decks

Busbridge (or Bushbridge) was launched in 1782 as an East Indiaman for the British East India Company (EIC). She made seven voyages for the EIC before she was broken up. In June 1795, during her sixth voyage, she participated in the capture of eight vessels of the Dutch East India Company. She was laid up for several years on her return from her seventh voyage and sold for breaking up in 1805.

== Career ==
EIC voyage #1 (1782–1784): Captain Todd sailed from Portsmouth on 11 September 1782, bound for Madras and Bengal. Busbridge returned to The Downs on 7 August 1784.

EIC voyage #2 (1785–1786): Captain Thomas Robertson sailed from The Downs on 15 March 1785, bound for China. Busbridge arrived at Whampoa anchorage on 24 September. She left China on 28 January 1786, reached St Helena on 2 May, and arrived at Long Reach on 10 July.

EIC voyage #3 (1787–1788): Captain Robertson sailed from The Downs on 19 February 1787, bound for Madras and Bengal. Busbridge reached Madras on 6 June and arrived at Diamond Harbour on 27 June. Homeward bound, she was at Cox's Island on 16 November, returned to Madras on 6 January 1788, reached St Helena on 2 March, and arrived at Long Reach on 29 April.

EIC voyage #4 (1789–1790): Captain Robertson sailed from The Downs on 7 March 1789, bound for Madras and Bengal. Busbridge reached Madras on 24 June and arrived at Diamond Harbour on 3 July. Homeward bound, she was at Cox's Island on 23 November and Saugor on 14 December. She reached St Helena on 2 March 1790, and arrived at Long Reach on 1 May.

EIC voyage #5 (1792–1793): Capt Robertson sailed from The Downs on 15 April 1792, bound for Madras and Bengal. Busbridge reached Madras on 25 August and arrived at Diamond Harbour on 19 September. Homeward bound, she was at Saugor on 7 February 1793 and reached St Helena on 22 May. She sailed from St Helena on 20 June and arrived at Long Reach on 24 August.

The EIC inspected the East Indiamen as they arrived and on 15 October fined Robertson and eight other captains £100 each for having not stowed their cargoes in conformance with the Company's orders. The money was to go to Poplar Hospital. (Note: There was a second assessment, on 30 July 1794 of a fine, but whether this was a restatement or a separate assessment is unclear.)

EIC voyage #6 (1794–1795): French Revolutionary Wars had broken out as Busbridge was returning from Bengal on her fifth voyage. Captain Robertson acquired a letter of marque on 17 August 1793. However, he did not sail her on her sixth voyage. Captain Samuel Maitland acquired a letter of marque on 21 December.

The British government held her at Portsmouth, together with a number of other Indiamen in anticipation of using them as transports for an attack on Île de France (Mauritius). It gave up the plan and released the vessels in May 1794. It paid £1,365 12s for having delayed her departure by 72 days.

Captain Maitland sailed from Portsmouth on 2 May 1794, bound for Madras and China. Busbridge reached Madras on 11 September and arrived at Diamond Harbour on 15 October. Homeward bound, She was at Saugor on 31 December. She reached Madras on 3 March 1795 and reached St Helena on 22 May.

The British gathering at St Helena for convoy home found out that a large squadron of Dutch East Indiamen would be sailing from the Dutch Cape Colony. After France had invaded Holland earlier that year, instructions had gone out throughout the British colonies and Navy that Dutch vessels were to be detained. Between 3 June and 17 June an ad hoc squadron consisting of HMS Sceptre and the Indiamen General Goddard and Manship, succeeded in capturing eight Dutch East Indiamen off St Helena.

Busbridge was in a second squadron of East Indiamen and she and Asia arrived on the scene in time to help board the Dutch vessels. There were no casualties on either side. The British then brought their prizes into St Helena on 17 June.

The entire convoy Indiamen and prizes, all under escort by Sceptre, left St Helena in August. Busbridge arrived at Long Reach on 19 October.

Because the capture of the Dutch vessels had occurred before Britain had declared war on the Batavian Republic, the vessels became Droits to the Crown. Still, prize money, in the amount of two-thirds of the value of the Dutch ships amounted to £76,664 14s. Of this, £61,331 15s 2d was distributed among the officers and crew of Sceptre, General Goddard, Busbridge, Asia, and Swallow. The remainder went to the garrison at St Helena, and various vessels in the St Helena roads. Thirty-three years later, in July 1828, there was a small final payment. (Note: A first-class share was worth £4 3s 6d; a fourth-class share was worth 3s 1d.)

EIC voyage #7 (1796–1799): Captain John Dobrée acquired a letter of marque on 2 June 1796. He sailed from Portsmouth on 11 August 1796, bound for Bengal. Busbridge reached the Cape of Good Hope on 18 November and arrived at Kedgeree on 28 February 1798.

The British government chartered Busbridge, as well as numerous other Indiamen and country ships, to serve as a transport in a planned attack on Manila. She was Diamond Harbour on 2 April, and Madras on 29 August. She sailed to Penang, where she arrived on 17 September. There she joined the other vessels. Between 2 September and 26 November Busbridge was under the command of Lieutenant Kempt (Royal Navy).

When the British Government cancelled the invasion following a peace treaty with Spain, it released the vessels it had engaged. On 9 December Busbridge returned to Madras and on 29 February 1798 arrived at Calcutta.

Homeward bound, Busbridge was at Diamond Harbour on 5 July and Saugor on 10 August. She returned to Madras on 2 October, reached the Cape on 3 January 1799 and St Helena on 8 February, and arrived at Long Reach on 15 July.

The EIC charged the British government some £6083 for demurrage for the 292 days delay to Busbridge's original voyage, plus £800 for table expenses. Dobrée sued for additional expenses but lost.

== Fate ==
Busbridge was laid up after her return to England in 1799. She was sold in 1805 for breaking up.
