= HMS Inflexible (1780) =

Ship of the line of the Royal Navy

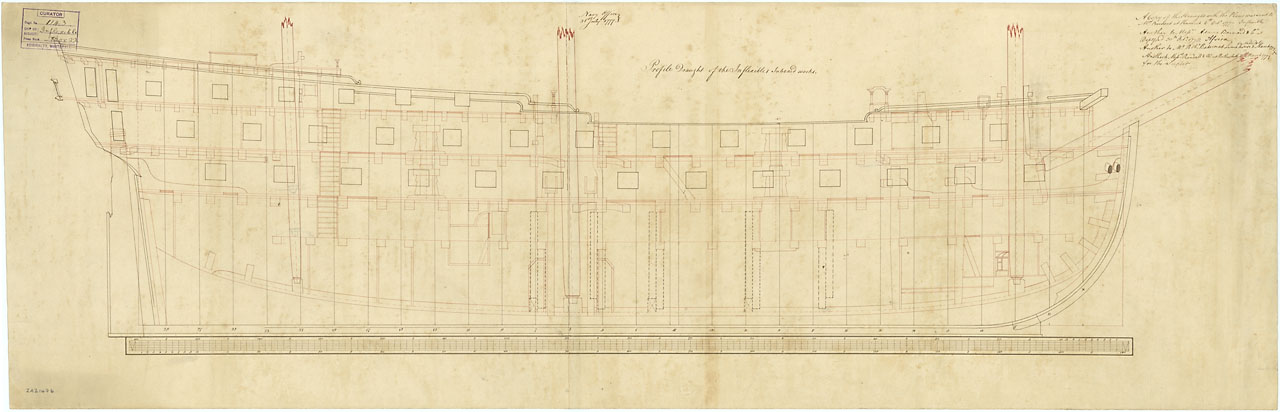
- Plan showing the inboard profile for Inflexible (1780), and later for Africa, Dictator, and Sceptre, all 64-gun third rate, two-deckers.

History

Great Britain
- Name: HMS Inflexible
- Ordered: 26 February 1777
- Builder: Barnard, Harwich
- Laid down: April 1777
- Launched: 7 March 1780
- Honours and awards: Participated in Battle of Cuddalore; Naval General Service Medal with clasp "Egypt"
- Fate: Broken up, 1820

General characteristics
- Class & type: Inflexible-class ship of the line
- Tons burthen: 1386 (bm)
- Length: 159 ft (48 m) (gundeck)
- Beam: 44 ft 4 in (13.51 m)
- Depth of hold: 18 ft 10 in (5.74 m)
- Propulsion: Sails
- Sail plan: Full-rigged ship
- Armament: Gundeck: 26 × 24-pounder guns; Upper gundeck: 26 × 18-pounder guns; QD: 10 × 4-pounder guns; Fc: 2 × 9-pounder guns

HMS Inflexible was a 64-gun third rate ship of the line of the Royal Navy, launched on 7 March 1780 at Harwich.

In 1783, she fought in the Battle of Cuddalore.

Because Inflexible served in the navy's Egyptian campaign (8 March to 8 September 1801), her officers and crew qualified for the clasp "Egypt" to the Naval General Service Medal that the Admiralty authorized in 1850 to all surviving claimants. (Note: A first-class share of the prize money awarded in April 1823 was worth £34 2s 4d; a fifth-class share, that of a seaman, was worth 3s 11½d. The amount was small as the total had to be shared between 79 vessels and the entire army contingent.)

In 1807 she was present at the Battle of Copenhagen, joining on 7 August off Helsingor (Captain Joshua Rowley Watson).

Inflexible became a storeship in 1793, and was eventually broken up in 1820.
