= Essex (1780 EIC ship) =

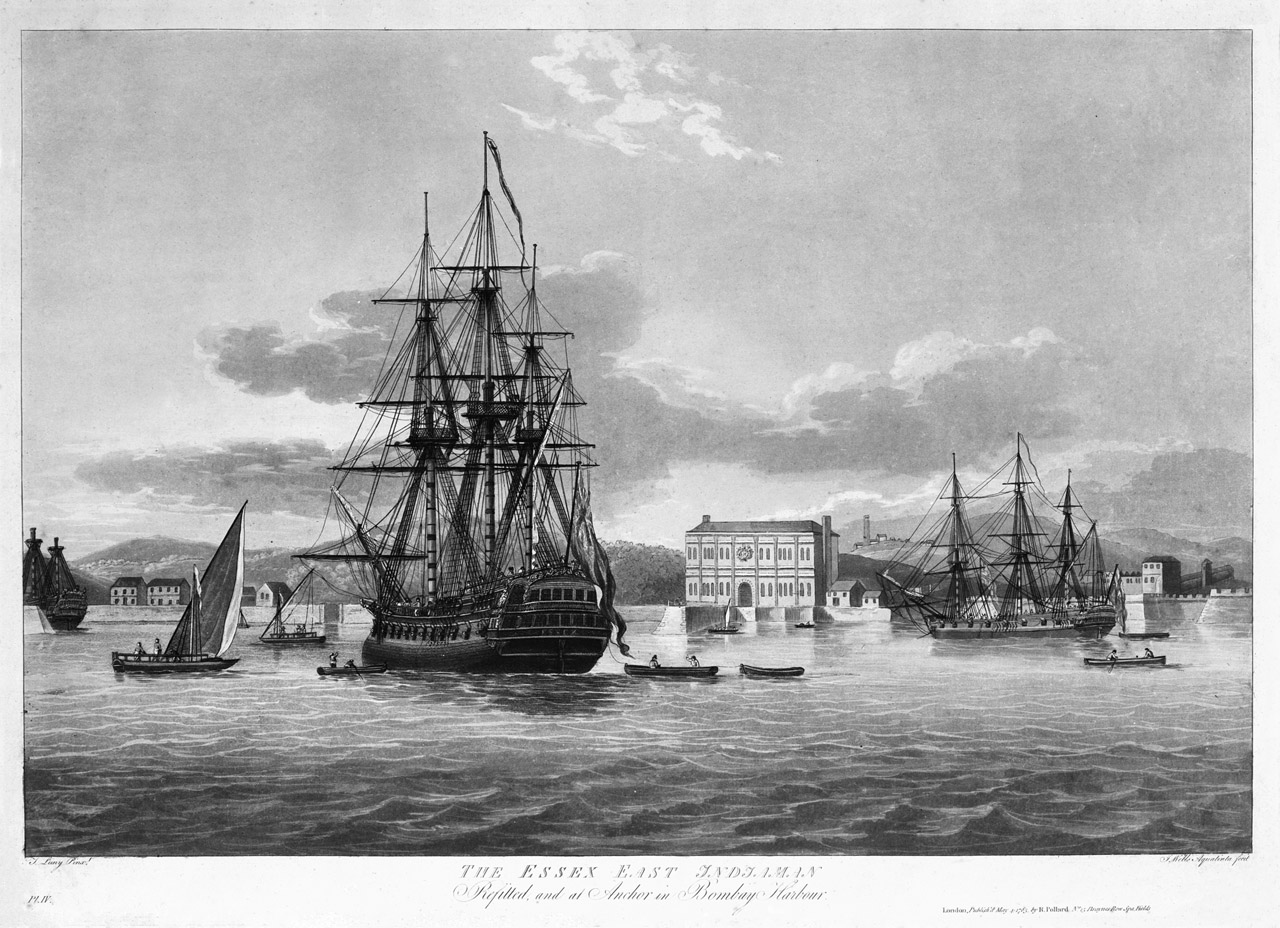
- The Essex refitted, and at anchor in Bombay

History

Great Britain
- Name: Essex
- Namesake: British East India Company
- Owner: Henry Boulton
- Builder: Perry, Blackwall
- Launched: October 1780
- Fate: Sold 1798 for hulking or breaking up

General characteristics
- Tons burthen: 793, 799, or 79914/94 (bm)
- Length: Overall:143 ft 3 in (43.7 m); Keel:115 ft 5 1/2 in (35.2 m) (keel)
- Beam: 36 ft 0 7/8 in (11.0 m)
- Depth of hold: 15 ft 1 in (4.6 m)
- Propulsion: Sails
- Sail plan: Full-rigged ship
- Complement: 105
- Armament: 26 × 9&4-pounder guns
- Notes: Three decks

Essex was launched in 1780 as an East Indiaman. She made six voyages for the British East India Company (EIC). On her first voyage she was present at an inconclusive battle with the French, and later at a second inconclusive engagement with a French frigate. In 1798 she was sold to be hulked or broken up.

== Career ==
EIC voyage #1 (1781–1783): Captain Arthur Morris sailed from Portsmouth on 13 March 1781, bound for Madras and China as part of a convoy of Indiamen accompanying a British squadron under Commodore George Johnstone. At about the same time as the British sailed, a French squadron under the command of Bailli de Suffren left France. Both squadrons were en route to the Cape of Good Hope, the British to take it from the Dutch, the French aiming to help defend it and French possessions in the Indian Ocean, including Rodriguez Island, Ile Bourbon (Réunion), Île de France (Mauritius), and Pondicherry.

The British stopped at São Tiago to take on water, with Essex arriving on 9 April. The French squadron attacked the British on 16 April in the battle of Porto Praya. Due to the unexpected nature of the encounter, neither fleet was prepared for the engagement and the result was an inconclusive battle in which the French warships sustained more damage than did the British. Though the battle was inconclusive, it did enable the French to forestall the British attack on the Cape. The British sailed on to the Cape. At the Cape, Johnstone captured five Dutch East Indiamen at the battle of Saldanha Bay. The British Indiamen then sailed on, directly, or indirectly, to India.

Essex arrived at Madras on 24 August. She was at 19 Oct Tranquebar on 19 October, trincomalee on 4 January 1782, and Tellicherry on 13 February.

On 20 April a gale struck near Bombay. Several vessels were lost, and Essex lost masts. She arrived at Bombay on 24 April.

Essex left Bombay on 8 August in company with the Indiamen Asia, Locko, and Osterley, and the country ship Shah Byram Gore. As the squadron was sailing through the Strait of Malacca, on 9 September the ships encountered the 38-gun French frigate Pourvoyeuse, which was under the command of Captain de Lannuguy-Tromelin. After an engagement the next day that lasted some two-and-a-half hours and in which Osterley had two men killed, and Locko and Essex had several men injured from exploding cartridges, Pouvoyeuse withdrew.

Essex arrived at Whampoa anchorage on 5 October, as did Asia and Osterley. Locko had arrived the day before.

Homeward bound, Essex crossed the Second Bar on 19 December, reached St Helena on 18 June 1783, and arrived at the Downs on 5 October.

EIC voyage #2 (1785–1786): Captain John Strover sailed from The Downs on 7 January 1785, bound for Madras and China. Essex reached St Augustine's Bay on 22 May, and arrived at Madras on 3 July. She arrived at Whampoa on 10 August. Homeward bound, Essex crossed the Second Bar on 3 February 1786, reached St Helena on 8 June, and arrived at the Downs on 14 August.

EIC voyage #3 (1788–1789): Captain Strover sailed from The Downs on 20 January 1788, bound for St Helena and China. Essex reached St Helena on 12 May and Batavia on 27 August. She arrived at Whampoa on 2 November. Homeward bound, Essex crossed the Second Bar on 8 February 1789, reached St Helena on 4 May, and arrived at the Downs on 8 July.

EIC voyage #4 (1791–1792): Captain Strover sailed from Portsmouth on 17 May 1791, bound for Bombay. Essex reached Johanna on 28 September, and arrived at Bombay on 17 November. On 12 January 1792 she was at Surat, and she returned to Bombay on 22 January. Homeward bound, she was at Tellicherry on 27 February, and Anjengo on 8 March. She reached St Helena on 26 June and arrived at The Downs on 1 September.

EIC voyage #5 (1794–1795): War with France had broken out in 1793. Captain Strover acquired a letter of marque on 20 November.

The British government held Essex at Portsmouth, together with a number of other Indiamen in anticipation of using them as transports for an attack on Île de France (Mauritius). It gave up the plan and released the vessels in May 1794. It paid £1,500 for having delayed her departure by 72 days.

Captain Strover was at Portsmouth on 24 April, and sailed on 2 May, bound for Madras and Bengal. Essex reached Madras on 10 September and arrived at Diamond Harbour on 24 October. Homeward bound, she was at Saugor on 30 December. She reached St Helena on 24 May 1795 St Helena.

While Essex was at St Helena, the 64-gun third rate HMS Sceptre and the Indiaman General Goddard, together with the assistance of some other Indiaman, captured eight Dutch East Indiamen.

The convoy of British and captured Dutch East Indiamen arrived at Shannon on 13 September. Essex arrived back at The Downs on 15 October. Although Essex had not actively engaged the Dutch, she did share in the prize money.

EIC voyage #6 (1796–1798): Captain Strover sailed from Portsmouth on 29 March 1796, bound for Madras and Bengal. Essex reached Simon's Bay on 22 July.

While she was at the Cape Captain Strover became Commodore of the East Indiamen in False Bay. Some had come with Vice-Admiral Sir George Elphinstone's expedition to the Dutch Cape Colony. Elphinstone took his naval vessels to intercept a Dutch naval squadron in an action that resulted in the Capitulation of Saldanha Bay. He placed the merchantmen under Strover's overall command and charged him with organizing a defence should the Dutch evade the Royal Navy and attack Simon's Bay. After the capture of the Dutch squadron the Indiamen were free to proceed on their voyages. (Note: The EIC later awarded Strover with a large silver two-handled urn-shaped cup inscribed "Presented by the EAST INDIA COMPANY, to CAPTAIN STROVER, OF THE ESSEX EAST INDIA-MAN for his gallant conduct at the Capture of the CAPE OF GOOD HOPE".)

Essex arrived at Madras on 17 November. On 2 December she was at Trincomalee, and she returned to Madras on 5 January 1797. She arrived at Kedgeree on 1 February. She sailed for Bombay and was at Saugor on 12 May, Anjengo on 12 April, and Tellicherry on 2 May. She arrived at Bombay on 8 June. She returned to Bombay on 12 August. Homeward bound, she reached the Cape on 22 October and St Helena on 3 December. She arrived at The Downs on 30 January 1798.

== Fate ==
Essex was sold in 1798 to be hulked or broken up.
