= John Barrett (Royal Navy officer) =

Irish Royal Navy captain

Captain John Barrett
- Born: Drogheda, County Louth, Ireland
- Died: 1810; Texel, France (present day Netherlands)

John Barrett (died 1810) was an Irish captain in the Royal Navy.

== Life ==
A native of Drogheda, Barrett was made a lieutenant on 2 November 1793, and having distinguished himself in command of the store-ship Experiment at the capture of St. Lucia, in June 1795, he was, on 25 November, advanced to the rank of post-captain.

In October 1808, during the Gunboat War Barret had the dangerous task of convoying a merchant fleet of 137 sail through the Sound, then infested by the Danish gunboats. His force, quite unsuitable for the work, consisted of his own ship, HMS Africa, of 64 guns, and a few gun-brigs; in a calm, the small heavily armed row-boats of the Danes had an enormous advantage, and in an attack on the English squadron on 20 October they inflicted a very heavy loss on the Africa. In such a contest the English gun-brigs were useless, and the Danish boats, taking a position on the Africa's bows or quarters, galled her exceedingly; twice her flag was shot away, her masts and yards badly wounded, her rigging cut to pieces, her hull shattered, and with several large shot between wind and water; nine men were killed and fifty-three wounded. The engagement lasted all the afternoon. "Had the daylight and calm continued two hours longer, the Africa must either have sunk or surrendered; as it was, her disabled state sent the ship back to Carlscrona to refit".

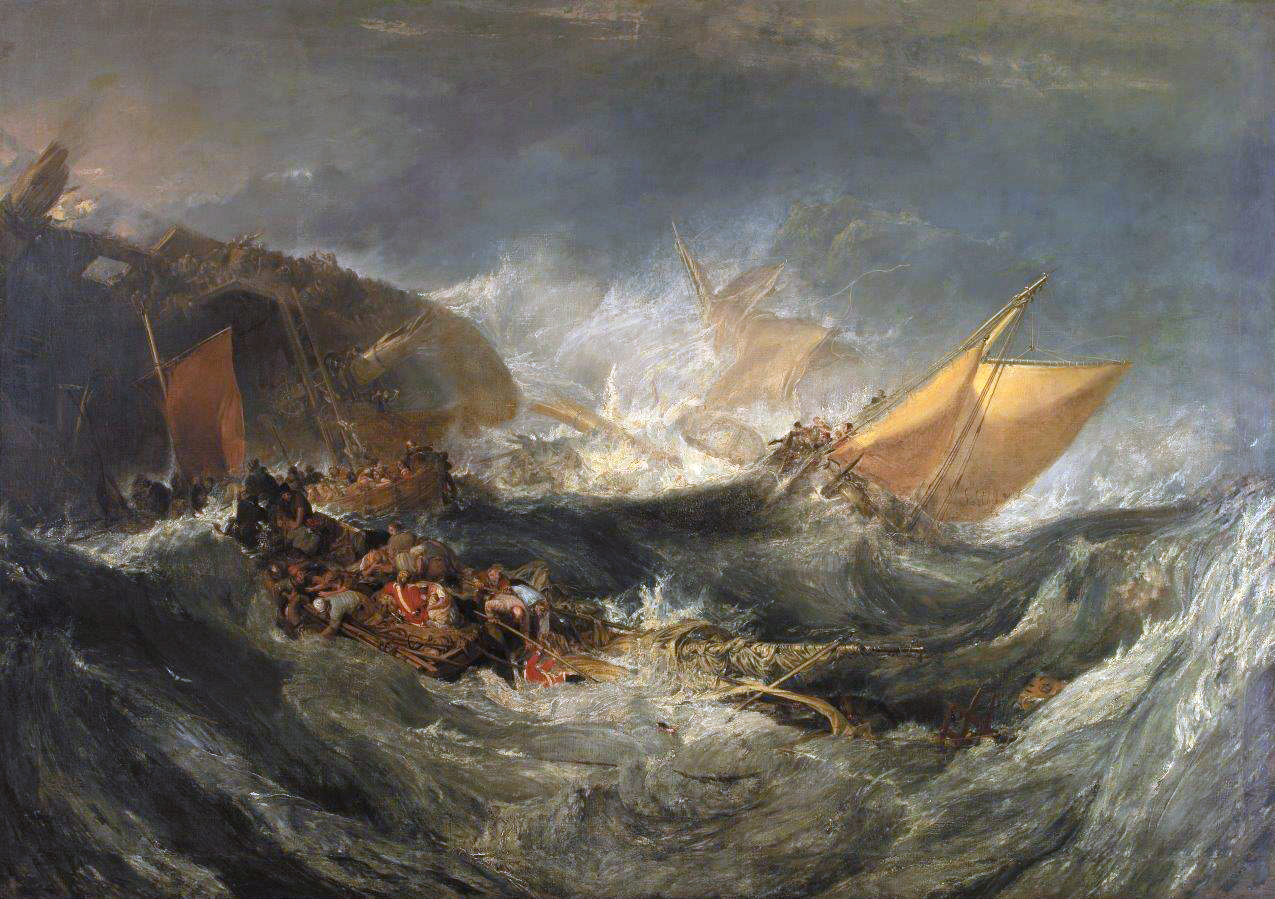
The Wreck of a Transport Ship by J. M. W. Turner

In 1810 Barrett had command of HMS Minotaur, 74 guns, and was again employed in convoying the Baltic trade. On a wild stormy night of December the ship was driven on the sands of the Texel and lost, with nearly 500 of her crew, Barrett amongst them. He is described as having acted to the last with perfect coolness and composure. "We all owe nature a debt", he is reported to have said; "let us pay it like men of honour".
