= George Frederick Ryves =

Rear-Admiral George Frederick Ryves
- Born: 8 September 1758
- Died: 20 May 1826 (aged 67)
- Military career
- Allegiance: United Kingdom
- Branch: Royal Navy
- Service years: 1774–1826
- Rank: Rear-Admiral
- Commands: HMS Bulldog; HMS Agincourt; HMS Gibraltar; HMS Africa
- Conflicts: American Revolutionary War; French Revolutionary Wars; Napoleonic Wars

George Frederick Ryves (8 September 1758 - 20 May 1826) was an officer of the Royal Navy who saw service during the American War of Independence, and the French Revolutionary and Napoleonic Wars, rising to the rank of rear-admiral.

== Life ==
George was born on 8 September 1758, the son of Thomas Ryves, of a long-established Dorset family, by his second wife, Anna Maria, daughter of Daniel Graham. He received his early education at Harrow, and in February 1774 was entered on board the Plymouth guard ship HMS Kent. In April 1775 he joined HMS Portland, going out to the West Indies as flagship of Vice-Admiral James Young, and shortly after arriving on the station was appointed to command the tender Tartar, carrying eight guns and a crew of thirty-three men. In her he had the fortune to capture upwards of fifty prizes, some of them privateers of superior force. In May 1778 the Portland returned to England, and in May 1779 Ryves joined HMS Europe, the flagship of Vice-Admiral Mariot Arbuthnot, who in September appointed him acting-lieutenant of the armed ship HMS Pacific. His lieutenant's commission was confirmed on 18 November 1780, and in December he was appointed to HMS Fox on the Jamaica station. In her he returned to England in 1782, and early in 1783 he was appointed to HMS Grafton, which sailed for the East Indies; but, having been dismasted in a gale in the Bay of Biscay, was obliged to put back and, consequent on the peace, was paid off and Ryves placed on half-pay.

In the armament of 1787 he was appointed first lieutenant of the frigate HMS Aurora, and in January 1795 to HMS Arethusa on the coast of France. On 4 July 1795 he was promoted to the command of HMS Bulldog, then in the West Indies, and went out to her as a passenger in HMS Colossus. On arriving at St. Lucia, in the absence of the Bulldog, Ryves volunteered for service with the seamen landed under the command of Sir Hugh Cloberry Christian for the reduction of the island, and rendered important assistance in the making of roads and the transporting of heavy guns. He afterwards joined the Bulldog, in which he returned to England in September 1797. On 29 May 1798 he was advanced to post rank, and in April 1800 was appointed to the 64-gun HMS Agincourt, which during the summer carried the flag of Sir Charles Morice Pole on the Newfoundland Station.

In the following year the Agincourt was one of the fleet with Lord Keith on the coast of Egypt, and in March 1802 Ryves was sent with a small squadron to receive the cession of Corfu. Afterwards, on intelligence that the French were preparing to seize on the island of La Maddalena, he was sent there to prevent the encroachment. The intelligence proved to be incorrect; but while waiting there Ryves carried out a survey of the roadstead, then absolutely unknown, and by his chart Nelson, in the following year, was led to make it his base, calling it, in compliment to Ryves, Agincourt Sound. In May 1803 Ryves was moved to HMS Gibraltar, in which he remained in the Mediterranean, under Nelson's command, till the summer of 1804, when the Gibraltar, being almost worn out, was sent home and paid off.

In 1810 Ryves commanded the 64-gun HMS Africa in the Baltic, from which he brought home a large convoy, notwithstanding the severity of the weather and the violence of the gales. He had no further service, but became rear-admiral on 27 May 1825, and died at his seat, Shrowton House, Dorset, on 20 May 1826. Ryves was twice married: first, in 1792, to Catherine Elizabeth, third daughter of the Hon. James Everard Arundell (third son of the sixth Baron Arundell, and father of the ninth); and, secondly, in 1806, to Emma, daughter of Richard Robert Graham of Chelsea Hospital. By both wives he had children; five of his sons served in the navy. The eldest, George Frederick Ryves, nominated a Companion of the Most Honourable Order of the Bath in 1826 for distinguished service in the First Anglo-Burmese War, died, a rear-admiral, in 1858.

(Note: Marshall's Roy. Nav. Biogr. iii. (volume ii.) 136) (Note: O'Byrne's Nav. Biogr. Dictionary page 1017) (Note: Nicolas's Despatches of Lord Nelson (see Index)) (Note: Service-book in the Public Record Office) (Note: Gentlemen's Magazine 1826, i. 640.])
