= Asia (1780 EIC ship) =

British East Indiaman 1780–1808

History

Great Britain
- Name: Asia
- Owner: Thomas Newte
- Operator: British East India Company
- Builder: Perry, Blackwall
- Launched: November 1780
- Renamed: Reine Louise de Prusse (1802)
- Fate: Unknown

General characteristics
- Tons burthen: 816
- Length: 143 ft 6 1/2 in (43.8 m) (overall): 116 ft 0 in (35.4 m) (keel)
- Beam: 36 ft 5 in (11.1 m)
- Depth of hold: 14 ft 11 1/2 in (4.6 m)
- Propulsion: Sails
- Sail plan: Full-rigged ship
- Complement: 100
- Armament: 1793: 26 × 9-pounder guns + 6 swivel guns; 1802:20 × 9-pounder guns

Asia was launched in 1780 and made six voyages as an East Indiaman for the British East India Company (EIC). She participated in three actions, two against the French and one against the Dutch. She left the EIC's service in 1799 and traded between London and Lisbon until 1802 when new owners from Embden renamed her Reine Louise de Prusse and returned her to trading with the East Indies. Asia is last listed in Lloyd's Register for 1808 on the London-Batavia trade.

== EIC voyages ==
=== EIC voyage #1 (1781-83) ===
Asia, under the command of Captain Robert Maw, sailed from Portsmouth on 13 March 1781, bound for Bombay and China as part of a convoy of Indiamen accompanying a British squadron under Commodore George Johnstone. At about the same time as the British sailed, a French squadron under the command of Bailli de Suffren left France. Both squadrons were en route to the Cape of Good Hope, the British to take it from the Dutch, the French aiming to help defend it and French possessions in the Indian Ocean, including Rodriguez Island, Ile Bourbon (Réunion), Île de France (Mauritius), and Pondicherry.

The British stopped at São Tiago to take on water, with Asia arriving on 10 April. The French squadron attacked the British on 16 April in the battle of Porto Praya. Due to the unexpected nature of the encounter, neither fleet was prepared to do battle, and the result was an inconclusive battle in which the French warships sustained more damage than did the British. Though the battle was inconclusive, it did enable the French to forestall the British attack on the Cape. The British sailed on to the Cape, with Asia arriving there on 21 July. At the Cape, Johnstone captured five Dutch East Indiamen at the battle of Saldanha Bay. The British Indiamen then sailed on, directly, or indirectly, to India.

Asia sailed to Johanna, which she reached on 3 September. The convoy left Johanna on 21 or 22 September, but ran into an adverse monsoon that drove the vessels to the coast of Arabia; the four Indiamen Asia, Latham, Locko, and Osterley were driven further, to Kissen Bay, near the Bab-el-Mandeb. The Indiamen were carrying the 2nd Battalion of the 42nd (Highland) Regiment of Foot. They remained there for some six weeks as the indigenes were friendly and the vessels could procure fresh food. The Highlanders entertained the indigenes with bagpipe music, and danced the Highland Fling; the indigenes reciprocated with a war dance involving shields and spears. The Indiamen arrived at Mocha on 4 December. Asia's log book puts her at "Qishm" on 5 December. Whether this was Qeshm, and she was not with the other three, or "Kissen Bay", is currently an open question. They then sailed out of the Red Sea, with Asia reaching Bombay on 4 March, two days before the others. A voyage that would take a coppered vessel not facing adverse winds about two and a half weeks had taken the four Indiamen five and a half months.

Asia left Bombay on 8 August in company with the Indiamen Locko. Essex, and Osterley, and the country ship Shah Byram Gore. As the squadron was sailing through the Strait of Malacca, on 9 September the ships encountered the 38-gun French frigate Pourvoyeuse, which was under the command of Captain de Lannuguy-Tromelin. After an engagement the next day that lasted some two and a half hours and in which Osterley had two men killed, and Locko and Essex had several men injured from exploding cartridges, Pouvoyeuse withdrew.

On 5 October Asia reached Whampoa anchorage. On 4 January 1783, Locko, Osterley, and Asia left Whampoa. On 22 January Locko parted company with Essex and Osterley in the straits of Lombon by one account, and on the 23rd near Caremata ((1°37′S 108°53′E), by another account. Locko and Asia then parted company on 30 January at "St Clement's Bank Peels Morcop". These are probably "St Clement's Reef" and "Pulo Mancap", at the lower end of the Karimata Strait. (Note: These areas or places are difficult to identify today. One set of coordinates places Pulo Mancap at 3°5′S 110°11′E), but there is no island (pulao) there. Pulo Mancap may simply be a designation for the SW corner of Borneo. The same source identifies Pulo Mancap Shoal a little to the south, approximately where earlier sources had placed St Clement's Bank.)

Asia reached St Helena on 17 June and arrived at The Downs on 28 October.

After the return to Britain of the four captains of the Indiamen that participated in the action on 10 September 1782, the EIC awarded them prizes. Robert Maw received a silver salver made in 1787 by Joseph Heriot, of London, and inscribed "The Gift of the Hon’ble East India Company to Robert Maw Esq’r Commander of the Asia East Indiaman for gallantly defending the said ship against a French frigate of 44 guns in the Straights of Malacca September, 1782."

=== EIC voyage #2 (1785-86) ===
Captain John Davy Foulkes left Portsmouth on 10 March 1785, bound for Benkulen and China. Asia reached Bencoolen on 2 July. She then sailed to Padang, which she reached on 5 Aug, before returning to Bencoolen on 19 August. Asia arrived at Whampoa on 30 October. She left on 5 March 1786, reached St Helena on 24 June, and arrived at Blackwall, London, on 20 September.

=== EIC voyage #3 (1788-89) ===
Captain Foulkes left Portsmouth on 5 April 1788, bound for Bombay and China. Asia reached Johanna on 6 July and arrived at Bombay 20 days later. She reached Batavia on 25 November, and arrived at Whampoa on 8 February 1789. She reached St Helena on 25 June and arrived at Blackwall on 3 September.

=== EIC voyage #4 (1791-92) ===
Captain Foulkes left The Downs on 26 April 1791, bound for Madras and Bengal. Asia reached Madeira on 9 May and arrived at Madras on 10 September. On 8 November she arrived at Diamond Harbour. Asia returned to Madras on 3 March 1792, and sailed to Benkulen, which she reached on 18 April. She then reached St Helena on 26 August and arrived at Blackwall on 2 November.

=== EIC voyage #5 (1794-95) ===
Captain John Davy Foulkes received a letter of marque on 6 December 1793.

The British government held her at Portsmouth, together with a number of other Indiamen in anticipation of using them as transports for an attack on Île de France (Mauritius). It gave up the plan and released the vessels in May 1794. It paid £1,500 for having delayed her departure by 72 days.

Foulkes sailed Asia from Portsmouth on 2 May 1794, bound for Madras and Bengal. She reached Madras on 11 September and arrived at Diamond Harbour on 15 October. Homeward bound, she passed Saugor on 16 December. By 31 January 1795 she was at Madras again, and then by 24 May she was at St Helena. Between 14 and 18 June Asia participated in the capture of seven Dutch ships off St Helena.

When HMS Sceptre arrived at St Helena in May she brought the news that France had invaded the Netherlands in January. Furthermore, under an order dated 9 February 1795, Royal Navy vessels and British letters of marque were to detain Dutch vessels and cargoes and bring them into British ports that they might be detained provisionally. Then on 2 June the British East India Company packet ship Swallow arrived from the Cape of Good Hope with the news than a convoy of Dutch East Indiamen had left the Cape, sailing for the Netherlands.

Captain Essington, of Sceptre formed a squadron to try and intercept the Dutch. Providentially, the General Goddard, an East Indiaman under the command of Captain William Taylor Money, was resting at St Helena while on her way back to England. The small squadron intercepted eight Dutch vessels, which surrendered on 15 June. The EIC ships Busbridge, Captain Samuel Maitland, and Asia arrived on the scene and helped board the Dutch vessels. There were no casualties on either side. The British then brought their prizes into St Helena on 17 June.

By 13 September Asia had reached the River Shannon and by 27 October she was at Blackwall.

Because the capture of the Dutch vessels had occurred before Britain declared war on the Batavian Republic, the vessels became Droits to the Crown. Still, prize money, in the amount of two-thirds of the value of the Dutch ships amounted to £76,664 14s. Of this, £61,331 15s 2d was distributed among the officers and crew of Sceptre, General Goddard, Busbridge, Asia, and Swallow. The remainder went to the garrison at St Helena, and various vessels in the St Helena roads. Thirty-three years later, in July 1828, there was a small final payment. (Note: A first-class share was worth £4 3s 6d; a fourth-class share was worth 3s 1d.)

=== EIC voyage #6 (1796-98) ===
Captain Foulkes left Portsmouth on 12 April 1796, bound for Madras, Bengal, Bombay, and China. By 21 July Asia was at Simon's Bay, and she reached Madras on 16 November. On 20 December she was at Trincomalee before returning to Madras on 4 January 1797. She arrived at Kedgeree on 1 February. She then followed the Indian coast to Anjengo, which she reached on 17 April, and then Mahé on 30 April and Bombay on 7 June. She reached Penang on 3 September, and arrived at Whampoa on 20 December. Asia reached St Helena on 5 August 1798, and arrived at Blackwall on 9 November.

== Later career ==
In 1799 Beatson & Co., London, purchased Asia to sail between London and Lisbon. The Register of Shipping for 1802 shows her master as L. Strong, her owner as Beatson & Co., and her trade as London transport.

Then on 31 February 1802 Beatson sold her to buyers in Embden, who renamed her Reine Louise de Prusse. She returned to the Far East trade. Lloyd's Register for 1804 gave her trade as London-Batavia. She was last listed in Lloyd's Register for 1808 in the London-Batavia trade. Her subsequent career and fate are unknown.
