= Inflexible-class ship of the line =

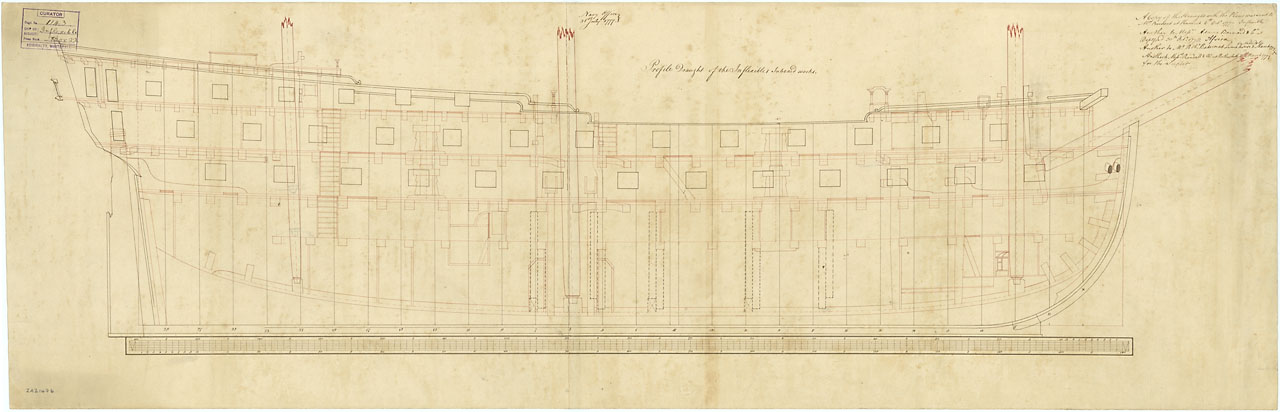

Class overview
- Name: Inflexible
- Operators: Royal Navy
- Preceded by: Worcester class
- Succeeded by: Crown class
- In service: 7 March 1780 – 1820
- Completed: 4
- Lost: 1

General characteristics
- Type: Ship of the line
- Length: 159 ft (48 m) (gundeck); 130 ft 7 1/2 in (39.8 m) (keel)
- Beam: 44 ft 4 in (13.51 m)
- Propulsion: Sails
- Armament: 64 guns: Gundeck: 26 × 24 pounders; Upper gundeck: 26 × 18 pdrs; Quarterdeck: 10 × 4 pdrs; Forecastle: 2 × 9 pdrs
- Notes: Ships in class include: Inflexible, Africa, Dictator, Sceptre

The Inflexible-class ships of the line were a class of four 64-gun third rates, designed for the Royal Navy by Sir Thomas Slade. The lines of this class were based heavily on Slade's earlier 74-gun Albion-class.

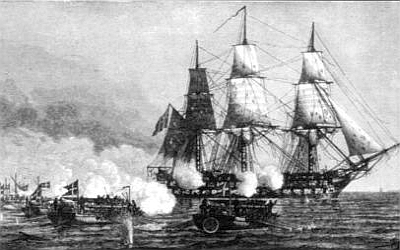
Danish gunboats attack the British ship of line HMS Africa in Drogden

== Ships ==
- HMS Inflexible

Builder: Barnard, Harwich
Ordered: 26 February 1777
Launched: 7 March 1780
Fate: Broken up, 1820

- HMS Africa

Builder: Barnard, Deptford
Ordered: 11 February 1778
Launched: 11 April 1781
Fate: Broken up, 1814

- HMS Dictator

Builder: Batson, Limehouse
Ordered: 21 October 1778
Launched: 6 January 1783
Fate: Broken up, 1817

- HMS Sceptre

Builder: Randall, Rotherhithe
Ordered: 16 January 1779
Launched: 8 June 1781
Fate: Wrecked, 1799
