= HMS Africa (1781) =

Ship of the line of the Royal Navy

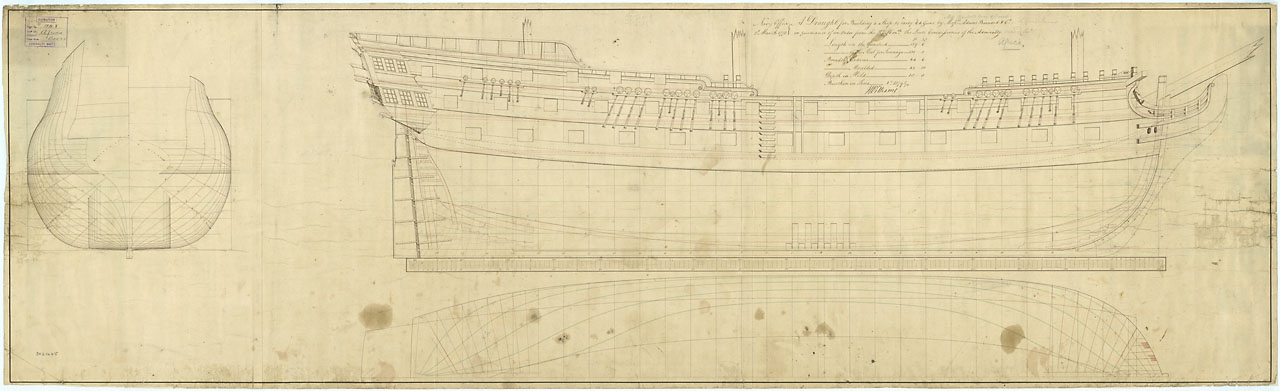
- HMS Africa

History

Great Britain
- Name: Africa
- Ordered: 11 February 1778
- Builder: Barnard, Deptford
- Laid down: 2 March 1778
- Launched: 11 April 1781
- Fate: Broken up, May 1814
- Notes: Participated in: Battle of Cuddalore; Battle of Trafalgar

General characteristics
- Class & type: Inflexible-class ship of the line
- Tons burthen: 1,4144/94 (bm)
- Length: 160 ft 10 in (49 m) (gundeck); 132 ft 9 in (40.5 m) (keel)
- Beam: 44 ft 9 in (13.6 m)
- Depth of hold: 18 ft 1 in (5.5 m)
- Propulsion: Sails
- Sail plan: Full-rigged ship
- Armament: 64 guns: LD: 26 × 24-pounder guns; UD: 26 × 18-pounder guns; QD: 10 × 4-pounder guns; Fc: 2 × 9-pounder guns

HMS Africa was a 64-gun third-rate ship of the line of the Royal Navy, launched by William Barnard at Barnard's Thames Yard in Deptford on 11 April 1781.

Commissioned in March 1781, during the American Revolutionary War, she was deployed to the East Indies in early 1782. She participated in the war’s final naval engagement, the Battle of Cuddalore on 20 June 1783, fighting against a French fleet. She returned to Britain and entered the reserve fleet after peace was declared.

Reactivated in 1793, she served in Nova Scotia before transferring to the Jamaica Station. In 1796, she sustained heavy damage from shore batteries during a failed British assault on Léogâne, Saint-Domingue (modern-day Haiti). Following repairs, she spent several years configured as a hospital ship. Africa was commanded at Trafalgar by Captain Henry Digby. Having become separated from the main British fleet the night before the battle, she arrived late and from an entirely different direction (the north). Misinterpreting a signal, Digby boldly sailed down the length of the enemy line alone. She engaged the massive 130-gun Spanish flagship Santísima Trinidad and fought the French ship Intrépide for 40 minutes. Africa suffered 62 casualties and lost her masts, requiring a tow to safety by HMS Conqueror after the battle.

On 15 October 1808, while escorting a large convoy of 137 merchant ships in the Baltic Sea, Africa was attacked. She was swarmed and heavily damaged in a four-hour battle against a fleet of small, nimble Danish gunboats. She managed to avoid capture and escaped to Sweden for emergency repairs.

At the start of the War of 1812, based in Halifax, Nova Scotia, she served as part of the British squadron that engaged in the famous, unsuccessful 60-hour chase of the American frigate USS Constitution in August 1812.

Worn out from decades of continuous, heavy use across the globe, the aging ship was paid off in March 1813 and broken up for scrap in Portsmouth in May 1814.

== Construction and design ==
Africa was a 64-gun third-rate Inflexible-class ship of the line designed by John Williams. Her class was a smaller version of the 74-gun ship of the line HMS Albion designed by Sir Thomas Slade which in turn was influenced by the 1719 Establishment design of the 90-gun ship of the line HMS Neptune.

Africa was ordered on 11 February 1778 to be built at Deptford Dockyard by Adams and Barnard and approved for construction on 29 February. She was laid down on 2 March and launched on 11 April 1781 with the following dimensions: 160 feet 10 inches (49 m) along the gun deck, 132 feet 9 inches (40.5 m) at the keel, with a beam of 44 feet 9 inches (13.6 m) and a depth in the hold of 18 feet 1 inch (5.5 m). She measured 1,4144/94 tons burthen. This armament consisted of twenty-six 24-pounder guns on her lower gundeck, twenty-six 18-pounder guns on the upper gundeck, ten 4-pounder guns on the quarterdeck and two 9-pounder guns on the forecastle. The fitting out process for Africa was completed at the Deptford and Woolwich dockyards in July.

The lead ship of Africa's class, HMS Inflexible, was launched in 1780 and opinions of her sailing qualities were so low that it was decided that no more ships of the design would be built after 1780. The next planned ship of the class, HMS Diadem, was instead built to the Intrepid-class design, and Africa and her sister ships were only completed to the deprecated design because by the time of Inflexible's trials they had already been laid down.

== Service ==
=== American Revolutionary War ===
Africa was commissioned by Captain Thomas Newnham in March 1781. In January of the following year command of the ship changed to Captain Robert McDowell and under him she sailed to the East Indies in the squadron of Commodore Sir Richard Bickerton on 6 February 1782. As such Africa fought in the unsuccessful Battle of Cuddalore on 20 June 1783. With the American Revolutionary War having ended in September she returned home to Britain where she was paid off in May 1784. The ship was then put in ordinary at Plymouth Dockyard in June. Africa was briefly commissioned for one month by Captain James Kempthorne in November 1790 but this was her only service until the beginning of the French Revolutionary Wars in 1792.

=== French Revolutionary Wars ===
The ship was recommissioned for this war under Captain Roddam Home in November 1793, under whom she sailed to Nova Scotia on 18 May 1794. Having transferred to the Jamaica Station she then participated in an attack on Léogâne, Saint-Domingue on 21 March 1796 where, after Africa and the ship of the line HMS Leviathan had been heavily damaged by shore batteries, the landings were called off. In October of the same year Africa was again paid off, spending almost two years out of service before she was recommissioned as a hospital ship under Lieutenant John Bryant in September 1798. Command of the ship changed to Lieutenant John Dixon in early 1800 but little else of note occurred in her service as a hospital ship.

=== Napoleonic Wars ===
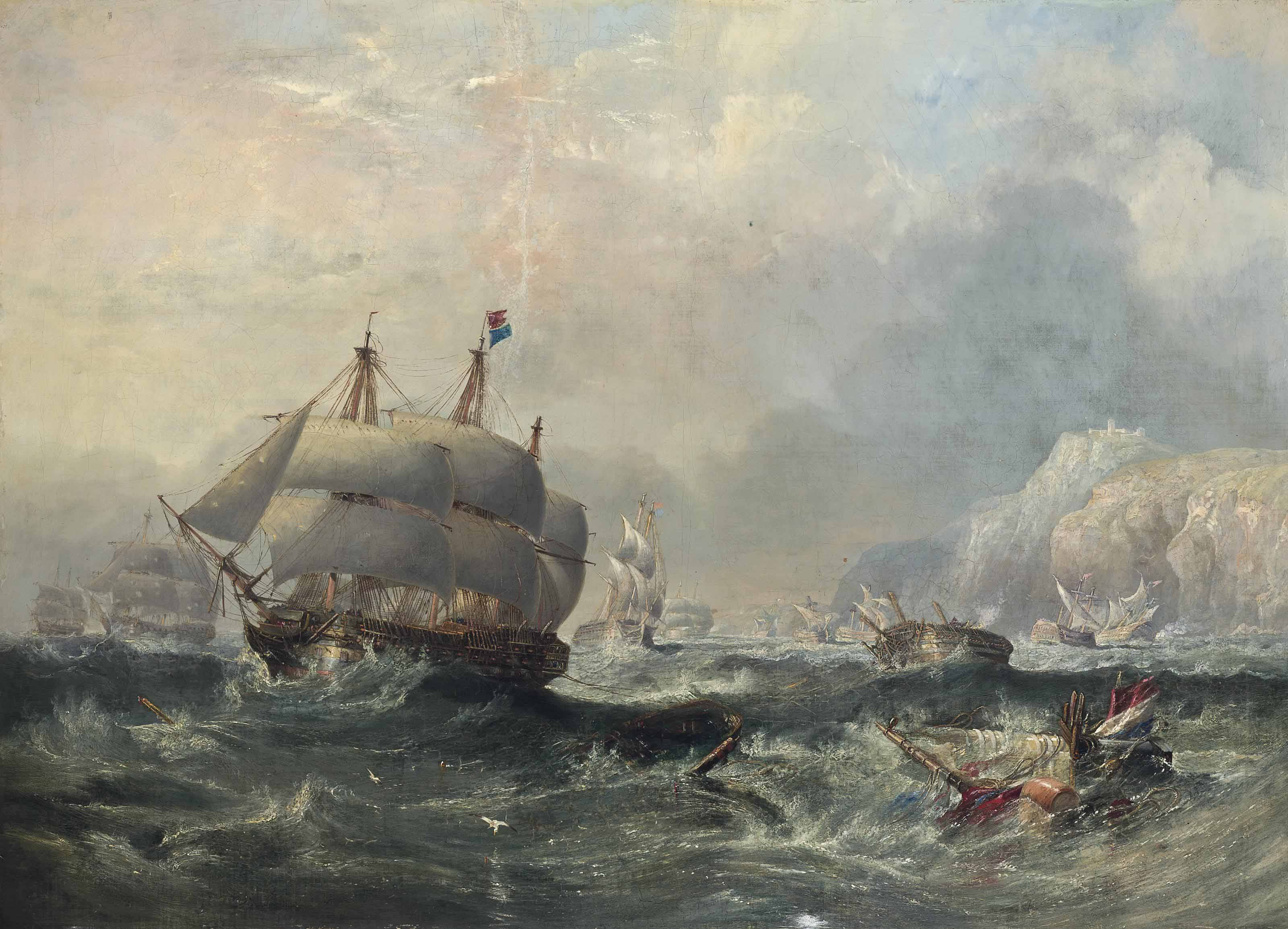
HMS Conqueror towing Africa off the shoals at Trafalgar, three days after the battle, painting by James Wilson Carmichael

The Napoleonic Wars having begun, Africa was reconfigured as a 64-gun ship of the line again by Thomas Pitcher at Northfleet between September 1804 and July 1805. She was recommissioned by Captain Henry Digby at the end of her conversion. Africa was present at the Battle of Trafalgar on 21 October 1805; having been separated from the main British fleet before the battle, she arrived from a different direction without knowing the battle plan that Admiral Horatio Nelson had devised. As the rest of the fleet engaged the combined Franco-Spanish fleet in a pell-mell battle, Digby sailed Africa down the line of enemy ships in a parallel fashion, exchanging broadsides. She lost 18 men killed and 44 wounded in the battle.

=== Gunboat War ===
During the Gunboat War, Africa was under the command of Captain John Barrett. On 15 October 1808, Africa was escorting a convoy of 137 merchant ships in the Baltic, with the assistance of the bomb vessel HMS Thunder and two gun-brigs. They left Karlskrona that day and on 20 October they anchored in the Øresund off Malmö. At noon a flotilla of Danish gunboats was seen moving towards the convoy and Africa sailed to intercept them. The flotilla consisted of 25 gunboats and seven armed launches, mounting some 70 heavy cannons and with an overall total of some 1600 men. It was under the command of Commodore Johan Cornelius Krieger. (Note: At the outbreak of hostilities in August 1807, Krieger was appointed commander of the mobile defence at Copenhagen. In 1810, his area of command was extended to the waters between Nakkehoved and Møn, and in 1812, the gunboats in the belt were further placed under his command. He also showed exceptional courage and skill in this position, was promoted to Commodore in 1808, and to Rear Admiral in 1812.)

At 1:30 the wind died and Africa was immobilized. By 2:50pm the gunboats had stationed themselves off Africa's quarters, where few of her guns could fire, and opened fire. The battle continued until 6:45pm when with night closing in all firing ceased. Had daylight lasted another hour the Danes might have captured Africa, however nightfall meant both forces left the battlefield without victory for either side. As it was, she had lost 9 men killed and 51 wounded, including Barrett. She was so badly battered that she had to return to Karlskrona for repairs. The convoy, however, managed to reach Britain.

In 1810 George Frederick Ryves commanded Africa, in the Baltic, from which he brought home a large convoy, notwithstanding the severity of the weather and the violence of the gales.

Lieutenant John Houlton Marshall was promoted to commander on the ship at a ceremony held on 21 October 1810 to commemorate the Battle of Trafalgar.

=== War of 1812 ===
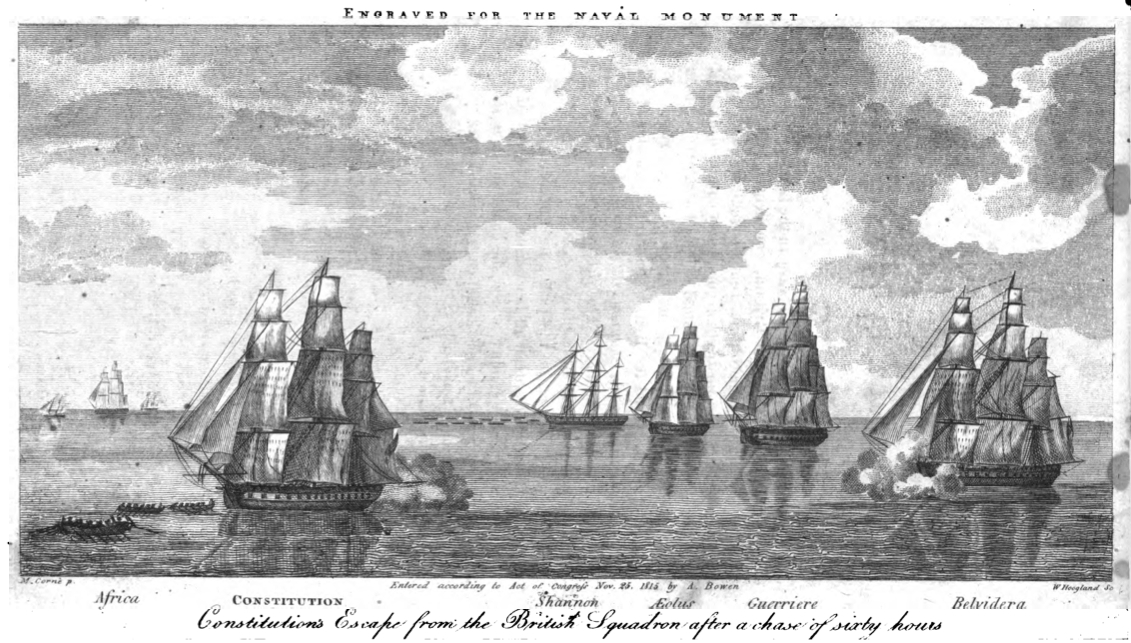
Constitution's escape from the British squadron after a chase of sixty hours, 1816

On 5 October 1811, Africa arrived at Halifax, Nova Scotia, followed by Spartan and Aeolus.

Africa was under the command of Captain John Bastard from November 1811 onwards. Africa was the flagship of Vice Admiral Herbert Sawyer, commander-in-chief of the North American Station until succeeded by John Borlase Warren who arrived in September 1812.

Africa was still in Halifax as of July 1812. Africa was present at the capture of the brig Minerva on 6 July, Oronoco on 11 July, and the 14-gun Nautilus on 16 July 1812.

After the War of 1812 with Britain broke out on 18 June 1812, Nautilus gained the dubious distinction of being the first American warship to be lost. A squadron built around the Third Rate Africa (64 guns) and the two Fifth Rate frigates, Shannon (38 guns) and Aeolus (32 guns), captured her off northern New Jersey. Nautilus was 24 hours out on a cruise from New York when Shannon and Aeolus captured her on 17 July. At the time of her capture she mounted 16 guns, had crew of 106 men and was under the command of Lieutenant William M. Crane. (Note: A first-class share of the prize money, that of a captain, was £68 15s 11d; a sixth-class share, that of an ordinary seaman, was worth 12 s 0¾d.) The Schooner Eleanor was taken as a prize on 31 July by Africa and Shannon, but was scuttled by order of the commanding officer

Africa was part of Sir Philip Broke's squadron that pursued but ultimately failed to catch USS Constitution on 14 August 1812.

It was reported in September 1812 that the schooner Lewis, of 6 Guns and 30 Men, was captured by the Hope, tender to Africa, off Halifax on 14 August 1812. Africa captured the Eastern Star on 17 August.

A court-martial was held on board Africa at Halifax on 2 October, following the capture of the HMS Guerriere on 19 August.

At the start of November, HMS Halifax noted that Africa was at Bermuda. On 12 November 1812, Africa departed from Halifax, in a convoy, destined for Portsmouth. On 24 December 1812, Africa arrived at Cork.

On 2 March 1813, Africa was moored at Spithead, off Portsmouth. Africa was put out of commission in March 1813. Bastard remained in command of Africa until May 1814.

== Fate ==
Africa was broken up in May 1814 at Portsmouth.
