= HMS Sceptre (1781) =

Ship of the line of the Royal Navy

Coordinates: 33°55′12″S 18°27′0″E

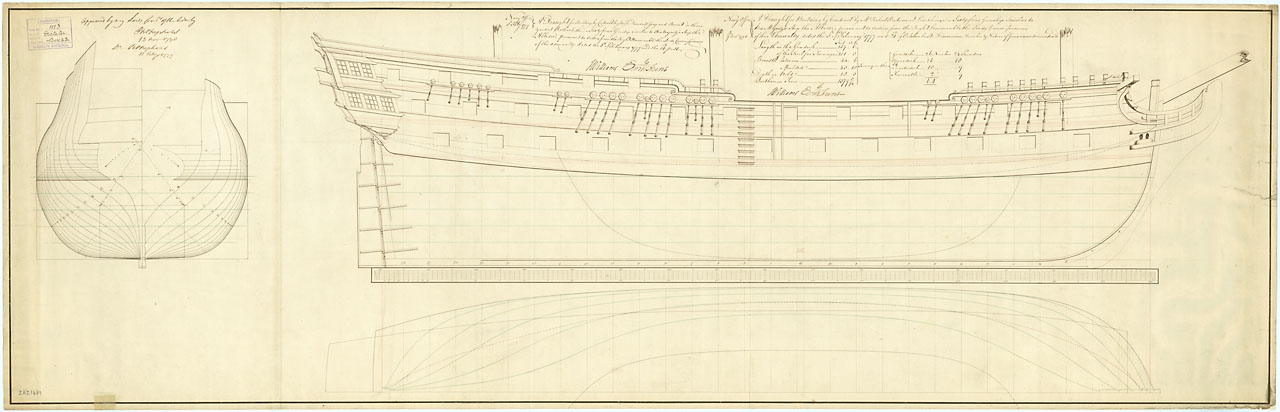
- Sceptre

History

Great Britain
- Name: HMS Sceptre
- Ordered: 16 January 1779
- Builder: Randall, Rotherhithe
- Laid down: May 1780
- Launched: 8 June 1781
- Fate: Wrecked in Table Bay, 5 November 1799
- Notes: Participated in: Battle of Trincomalee; Battle of Cuddalore (1783); Battle of Muizenberg

General characteristics
- Class & type: Inflexible-class ship of the line
- Tons burthen: 1398 (bm)
- Length: 159 ft (48 m) (gundeck)
- Beam: 44 ft 4 in (13.51 m)
- Draught: 5.7m
- Depth of hold: 18 ft 10 in (5.74 m)
- Propulsion: Sails
- Sail plan: Full-rigged ship
- Complement: 481 men in 1799
- Armament: Gundeck: 26 × 24-pounder guns; Upper gundeck: 26 × 18-pounder guns; QD: 10 × 4-pounder guns; Fc: 2 × 9-pounder guns

HMS Sceptre was a 64-gun third-rate ship of the line of the Royal Navy, launched on 8 June 1781 at Rotherhithe. She served in the American War of Independence and the French Revolutionary Wars before being wrecked in a gale in Table Bay, South Africa, in 1799. The ship was wrecked in a hurricane on 5 November 1799 in Table Bay near the Cape of Good Hope.

== Career ==
Shortly after completion she was sent out to the Indian Ocean to join Vice-Admiral Sir Edward Hughes's squadron. She arrived in time for the Battle of Trincomalee in 1782. This was the fourth battle of a bloody campaign between Vice-Admiral Hughes and the French Admiral Suffren's squadron.

The following year, she took part in the Battle of Cuddalore (1783), the final battle in the East Indies campaign. In the run-up to the battle Sceptre captured the Naïade, under captain Villaret, on the night of 11 April 1783. Naïade was armed with eighteen to twenty 8-pounder guns and ten swivel guns, and had a crew of 160 men. The British took her into service but never commissioned her; they then sold her in August 1784.

She was then laid up for the peace. In 1794, under the command of Commodore John Ford, Sceptre assisted in the capture of Port-au-Prince, Haiti.

On 12 March 1795, under the command of Captain William Essington, Sceptre sailed for the Cape of Good Hope as escort to fleet of East Indiamen sailing to India and China.

=== Capture of eight Dutch East Indiamen off St Helena ===
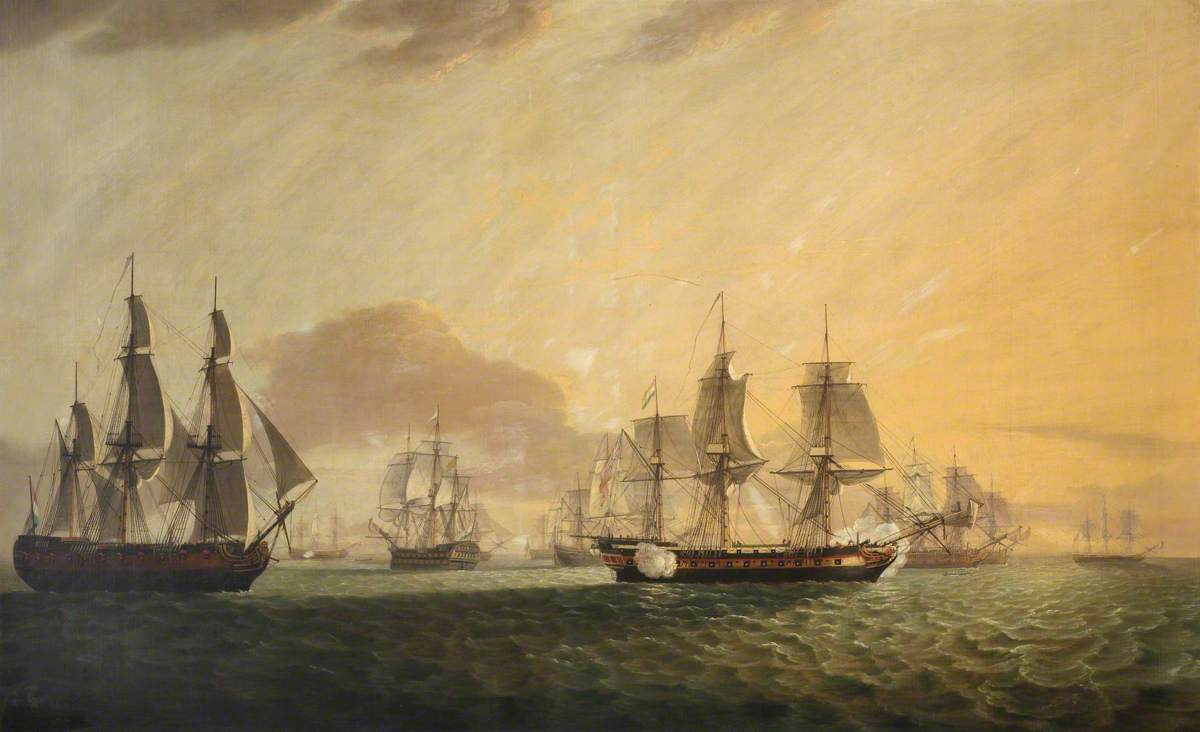
General Goddard, Sceptre, and Swallow capturing several Dutch East Indiamen in June 1795

When Sceptre arrived at St Helena she brought the news that France had invaded the Netherlands in January. Furthermore, under an order dated 9 February 1795, Royal Navy vessels and British letters of marque were to detain Dutch vessels and cargoes and bring them into British ports that they might be detained provisionally. Then on 2 June the British East India Company packet ship Swallow arrived from the Cape of Good Hope with the news than a convoy of Dutch East Indiamen had left the Cape, sailing for the Netherlands.

On 18 May 1795, the Dutch brig Komeet, under the command of Captain-Lieutenant Mynheer Claris, and the Dutch corvette Scipio, under the command of de Jong, set out from Table Bay with a convoy of sixteen East Indiamen, for Europe. Bad weather forced eight Indiamen back to the Cape. These eight sailed again on 22 May.

The remaining eight Indiamen, which had sailed on 18 May together with their two escorts, and a private Dutch ship from the Cape, the whaler Herstilder, sailed on. All but two of this group reached ports in then-neutral Norway.

Essington prevailed upon Colonel Brooke, the governor of St Helena, to lend him some troops and to put the British East India Company (EIC) vessels there at the time to form a squadron to try and intercept the Dutch. Providentially, General Goddard, an East Indiaman under the command of Captain William Taylor Money, was resting at St Helena while on her way back to England. On 3 June, Sceptre, General Goddard, Manship (also an EIC ship), and Swallow set out. Five other HEIC ships set out later, of which only Busbridge met up with the squadron. On 10 June the British captured the Dutch Indiaman Hougly, which Swallow escorted into St Helena, before returning to the squadron with additional seamen. Due to bad weather, Manship and Busbridge lost contact with Essington's squadron.

In the afternoon of 14 June, Essington's squadron sighted seven sail. At 1 a.m. the next morning General Goddard sailed through the Dutch fleet, which fired on her. She did not fire back. Later that morning, after some exchange of shots between the British and Dutch vessels, the Dutch surrendered. The HEIC ships Busbridge, Captain Samuel Maitland, and Asia, Captain John Davy Foulkes, arrived on the scene and helped board the Dutch vessels. There were no casualties on either side. The British then brought their prizes into St Helena on 17 June.

On 1 July, Sceptre, General Goddard and the prizes sailed from St Helena to gather in other returning British East Indiamen. They then returned to St Helena, where George Vancouver and Discovery, which had arrived there in the meantime, joined them. The entire convoy, now some 20 vessels or so strong, sailed from there in August to Shannon, where most arrived on 13 December. (Three Dutch vessels were lost. Houghly was lost on 1 September. Surcheance was lost on 5 September. Zeelelie escaped and wrecked off the Scilly Islands on 26 September.) General Goddard reached the Downs on 15 October.

Because the captures occurred before Britain had declared war on the Batavian Republic, the vessels become Droits to the Crown. Still, prize money, in the amount of two-thirds of the value of the Dutch ships amounted to £76,664 14s. Of this, £61,331 15s 2d was distributed among the officers and crew of Sceptre, General Goddard, Busbridge, Asia, and Swallow.

== Wrecking ==
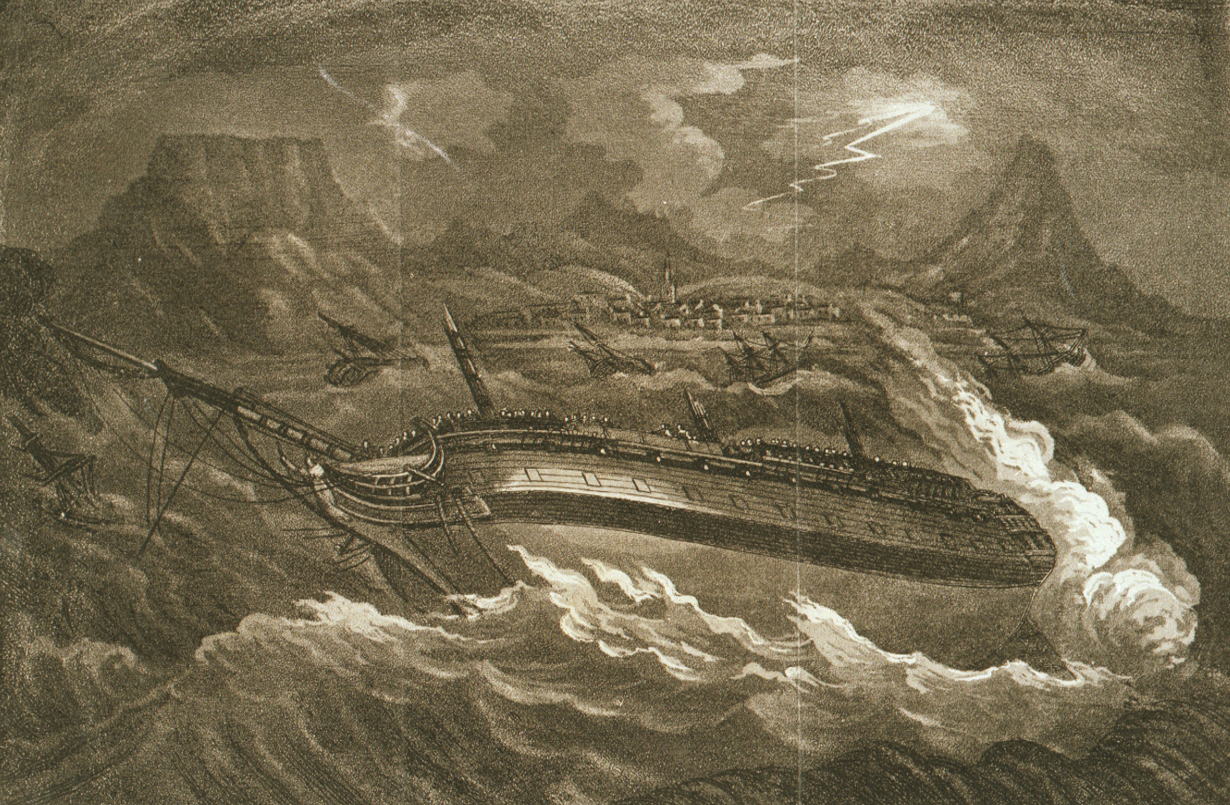
Sceptre sinking

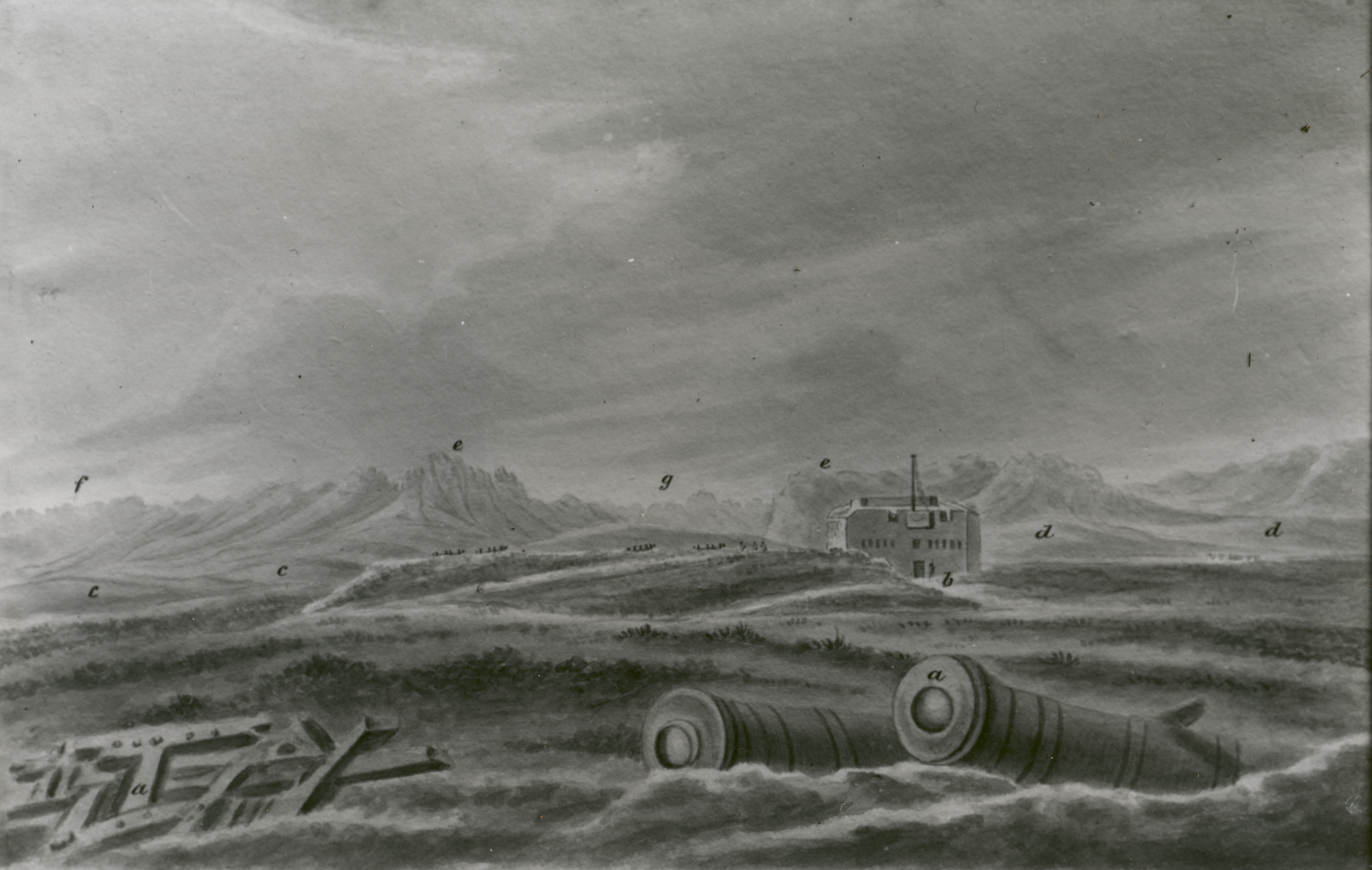
A sketch of wreckage from Sceptre at Craig's Tower by Lady Anne Barnard

While under the command of Captain Valentine Edwards, Sceptre was caught at anchor in a storm on 5 November 1799 along with seven other ships in Table Bay, near the Cape of Good Hope. At 10:30am, the captain ordered the topmasts struck, and the fore and main yards lowered in order to ease the ship in the strengthening winds. At midday, the ship fired a feu de joie on the occasion of the Gunpowder Plot, suggesting no apparent apprehension about the oncoming storm. However within half an hour, the main anchor cable parted and despite the laying of a secondary one, this also broke. At approximately 7pm, the ship was driven ashore onto a reef at Woodstock Beach at the site of the present-day Royal Cape Yacht Club and battered to pieces. One account states approximately 349 seamen and marines were killed or drowned. One officer, two midshipmen, 47 seamen, and one marine were saved from the wreck, but nine of these died on the beach. The ship was wrecked a few hundred meters from the spot where a similar sized Danish warship, the Oldenborg was also wrecked in the same hurricane.

On 14 December, the surviving junior officers and crew were subjected to a court martial (standard on the loss of a ship) but all were acquitted and no blame was apportioned for the loss of the ship.

== See also ==
- Shipwrecks of Cape Town
