= Osterley (1780 EIC ship) =

History

Great Britain
- Name: Osterley
- Namesake: Osterley Park (Note: Osterley Park was the home of the Child family, owners of Child & Co., a private bank that financed EIC voyages and ships.)
- Owner: Voyages 1–6:William Dent (Note: William Dent was the brother of Roger Dent, a partner in Child & Co.); Voyage 7:John Atkins
- Builder: Wells, Deptford
- Launched: 1780
- Captured: 1800 and recaptured
- Fate: Sent out to India in 1800 for the coastal trade; ultimate fate is unknown

General characteristics
- Tons burthen: 77567/94 (bm)
- Length: 139 ft 4 in (42.47 m) (overall), 111 ft 9 in (34.06 m) (keel)
- Beam: 36 ft 1 1/2 in (11.011 m)
- Depth of hold: 15 ft 0 in (4.57 m)
- Sail plan: Full-rigged ship
- Complement: 1793: 99; 1798: 70
- Armament: 1793: 26 × 12 & 6-pounder guns; 1798: 20 × 9-pounder guns

Osterley was a three-decker East Indiaman, launched in 1780, that made seven trips for the British East India Company between 1781 and 1800. She was present at two battles, and an engagement in which four Indiamen and a country ship engaged a French frigate. On her last trip a French frigate captured her in a single-ship action, but sent her on her way. Osterley eventually returned to Britain in 1800. Her subsequent fate is unknown.

== Voyages ==
=== Voyage #1 (1781–83) — Battles with the French ===
Osterley, under the command of Captain Samuel Rogers, left Portsmouth on 13 March 1781, bound for Bombay and China. (Note: Rogers was the nephew of Richard Dent, the owner of Osterley. He had also been captain of an earlier Osterley that the French had captured in 1779.) Osterley was part of a convoy of Indiamen accompanying a British squadron under Commodore George Johnstone.

Osterley reached São Tiago on 10 April. Six days later, Osterley was present at the Battle of Porto Praya, when a French squadron under the Bailli de Suffren attacked Johnstone. Both squadrons were en route to the Cape of Good Hope, the British to take it from the Dutch, the French aiming to help defend it and French possessions in the Indian Ocean. The British convoy and its escorting squadron had anchored at Porto Praya (now Praia) in the Cape Verde Islands to take on water, when the French squadron arrived and attacked them at anchor. Due to the unexpected nature of the encounter, neither fleet was prepared to do battle, and the result was an inconclusive battle in which the French warships sustained more damage than did the British. The French did capture the Indiamen Fortitude and Hinchinbrooke (recaptured the next day), and the victualer Edward, and gained a strategic victory, because Suffren beat Johnstone to the Cape and reinforced the Dutch garrison before continuing on his journey to the Ile de France (now Mauritius). Still, Johnstone went on to capture five Dutch East Indiamen and destroy a sixth at the battle of Saldanha Bay on 21 July.

Osterley, in convoy, too reached the Cape on 21 July. She then sailed to Johanna, which she reached on 2 September. the convoy left Johanna on 21 or 22 September, but ran into an adverse monsoon that drove the vessels to the coast of Arabia, and especially the four Indiamen Asia, Latham, Locko, and Osterley were driven further, to Kissen Bay, near the Bab-el-Mandeb. The Indiamen were carrying the 2nd Battalion of the 42nd (Highland) Regiment of Foot. They remained there for some six weeks as the indigenes were friendly and the vessels could procure fresh food. The Highlanders entertained the indigenes with bagpipe music, and danced the Highland Fling; the indigenes reciprocated with a war dance involving shields and spears. The Indiamen arrived at Mocha on 4 December. They then sailed out of the Red Sea and reached Bombay on 6 March. A voyage that would take a coppered vessel not facing adverse winds about two and a half weeks had taken the Indiamen five and a half months.

Osterley left Bombay on 8 August in company with the Indiamen Asia, Essex, and Locko, and the country ship Shah Byram Gore. (Note: The spelling of the country ship's name varies, sometimes being given as Byram Gore, and sometimes as Byramgore, and preceded, or not, by Shah or Shaw. She was a ship launched at Bombay Dockyard in 1775 and was lost in 1785. She provides the cover illustration to the book by Bulley (2000), which also has some information on her and her successors, all named for a legendary king of Persia. The cover illustration suggests that she was three-masted, and armed with 18 guns.) As the squadron was sailing through the Strait of Malacca, on 9 September the ships encountered the 38-gun French frigate Pourvoyeuse, which was under the command of Captain de Lannuguy-Tromelin. (Note: Lannuguy-Tromelin was the younger brother of Captain de Tromelin, who in 1779 had captured the previous Osterley.) After an engagement the next day that lasted some two and a half hours in which Osterley had two men killed, Pourvoyeuse withdrew.

Osterley arrived at Whampoa on 5 October. Homeward bound, she reached the Bocca Tigris on 4 January 1783 and St Helena on 18 June, and arrived at the Downs on 22 September.

=== Voyage #2 (1784–86) ===
Osterley was again under the command of Capt Samuel Rogers when she left the Downs on 22 December 1784, bound for Madras and China. She reached Madeira on 7 January 1785, Johanna on 30 April, Madras on 6 June, and Malacca on 31 July, and arrived at Whampoa on 1 September. Homeward bound, she crossed the Second Bar on 1 January 1786, reached St Helena on 4 May, and arrived at the Downs on 8 July.

=== Voyage #3 (1787–88) ===
Captain Joseph Clarkson sailed Osterley from the Downs on 22 January 1787, bound for Madras and China. She reached Johanna on 21 May and Madras on 22 June, and arrived at Whampoa on 10 October. In September, as she was on her way to China, Osterley encountered a frigate named Calypso, that ran out her guns; Clarkson manned his 10 guns and Osterley's crew stood ready when the French vessel announced that she was a naval vessel and sailed off. (Note: The French frigate may have been the Félicité-class frigate Calypso.) On her return trip Osterley crossed the Second Bar on 18 February 1788, reached St Helena on 13 July, and arrived at the Downs on 23 September.

=== Voyage #4 (1790–91) ===
Captain Joseph Clarkson left Torbay on 7 February 1790, bound for Bombay and China. Osterley reached Bombay on 3 June and arrived at Whampoa on 29 August. Returning home, she crossed the Second Bar on 8 December, reached the Cape on 9 April 1791 and St Helena on 28 April, and arrived at the Downs on 27 June.

=== Voyage #5 (1793–94) ===
Captain James Foy left Portsmouth on 22 May 1793, bound for China. War with France had broken out, so Foy sailed under a letter of marque (LoM) issued to him on 28 March 1793. The letter authorized him to take offensive action against the French should the occasion arise, not just defensive action.

Osterley was part of a convoy that also included the East Indiamen Prince William, Lord Thurlow, William Pitt, Barwell, Earl of Oxford, Pigot, Fort William, London, Glatton, Houghton, Marquis of Landsdown, Hillsborough, Ceres, and Earl of Abergavenny, amongst numerous other vessels, merchant and military, most of the non-Indiamen travelling to the Mediterranean.

Osterley reached Manila on 10 November and arrived at Whampoa on 20 December. Early in 1794 she crossed the Second Bar, reached St Helena on 18 June, and arrived at the Downs on 16 September.

=== Voyage #6 (1795–97) ===
Captain James Foy left Portsmouth on 24 May 1795, bound for China, and still covered by the same letter of marque. She sailed with a convoy of Indiamen that were bringing General Alured Clarke and his troops for the invasion of the Cape Colony. Osterley reached San Salvadore on 6 July.

She sailed on 13 July, together with the other Indiamen such as Northumberland, and under the escort of Sphinx. However, Sphinx ran into Warren Hastings and both vessels returned to port, accompanied by Exeter.

The fleet reached the Cape on 3 September. Osterley delivered her troops and then sailed for Whampoa, where she arrived on 7 March 1796. Homeward bound, she crossed the Second Bar on 21 June, reached St Helena on 20 November, and arrived at the Downs on 9 February 1797.

=== Voyage #7 (1798–1800) — Capture and recapture ===
Captain John Wintersgill Piercy left Portsmouth on 8 June 1798 bound for Madras and Bengal. The change in captain necessitated the issuance of a new letter of marque, which was issued on 5 April 1798. She reached Madras on 1 October and Trincomalee on 27 October, before returning to Madras, which she reached on 23 December. On 6 February she sailed from Madras carrying 104 officers and men of the 28th Light Dragoons. On 13 February 1799 she reached Tranquebar, from which she sailed the next day. Unfortunately, on 24 February she encountered the French frigate Forte, of 54 guns and some 460 men, under the command of Commander Beaulieu-Leloup.

A sharp action of about 45 minutes ensued in which Osterley sustained casualties of four men killed and 13 wounded before she struck. She had also sustained substantial damage. After removing the stores he needed, Beaulieu-Leloup on 27 February permitted Piercy to proceed as a cartel for an exchange of prisoners. In a notable single-ship action on 28 February, HMS Sybille captured Forte. The action cost the lives of both Beaulieu-Leloup and Captain Edward Cooke of Sybille.

Osterley almost immediately encountered Nonsuch, Captain Grey, who examined the papers of M. La Forée, the French officer accompanying Osterley. Nonsuch escorted her to Saugor Roads, where Osterley anchored on 1 March. Because she was so quickly recaptured, the EIC sustained no loss on her cargo.

Osterley reached Diamond Harbour on 2 March, but Sybille claimed her as a prize there, before allowing her to proceed. (Note: As Osterley was a cartel, it is not clear that Sybille had any grounds to claim salvage for her. Furthermore, it is not clear that Sybille at any time took possession of Osterley before she arrived at Saugor.) Osterley reached Calcutta on 3 April.

Osterley passed Saugor on 25 August, reached St Helena on 26 January 1800, and arrived at the Downs on 30 May. (Note: Piercy died in February 1802 at Islington.)

== Fate ==
Later in 1800 Osterley was sent out to India for the local coastal trade.
