= Locko (1780 EIC ship) =

History

France
- Name: Modeste
- Namesake: Modest
- Launched: c.1777
- Captured: 1778

Great Britain
- Name: Locko
- Namesake: Locko Park (Note: Locko Park was the residence of Robert Lowe, who owned 4/16ths of Locko, and was a partner with Robert Williams in the banking firm of Lowe, Vere, and Williams.)
- Owner: Robert Williams (principal managing owner)
- Acquired: 1780 (EIC service)
- Fate: Broken up c. 1788

General characteristics
- Tons burthen: Modeste: 1000 (French; "of load"); Locko: 922 (bm); Voy. #1; Locko: 758 (bm); Voy. #2&3
- Propulsion: Sails
- Sail plan: Full-rigged ship
- Complement: Modeste: 99; Locko: 95
- Armament: Modeste: 26 guns; Locko: 26 guns

Locko was originally the French East Indiaman Modeste, built in France. (Note: Although sources state that she was built for the French East India Company, the company had gone into liquidation in 1769.) The Royal Navy captured Modeste in 1778, while she was on the return leg of her maiden voyage, whereupon individuals associated with the British East India Company (EIC) purchased her. She entered the EIC's service in 1780, then performed three voyages for the EIC. On the first voyage she was present at the Battle of Porto Praya, and led an inconclusive attack by five merchant vessels on a French frigate. The second and third voyages were much less eventful. Locko's owners disposed of her on her return in 1788 from her third voyage.

== Capture ==
The French East Indiaman Modeste was returning to France from China in company with three other Indiamen when a gale on 25 September 1778 or so parted them. On 29 September, HMS Porcupine, Captain W. C. Finch, was on her way from Lisbon to England when she captured Modeste in the Bay of Biscay. Modeste was returning from China and richly laden. Her cargo, which consisted primarily of tea, was valued at £300,000, half of which was insured with English underwriters. (Note: English privateers captured two of Modeste's companions. Alexander and Tartar, both of Bristol, captured Ferme, while Two Brothers and Henry, both of Liverpool, captured Gaston. John Dawson, captain of the Mentor, captured what may have been the fourth, Carnatic, on 28 October.)

== British East Indiaman ==
Captain Patrick Lawson purchased Modeste, had her lengthened and superbly fitted out, and renamed her Locko. Lawson had been captain of Lord Holland when, on his return to Britain in 1779, a crew member had denounced him for smuggling. Lawson lost his goods, and his command, which he had purchased from Lord Holland's previous captain, Fasham Naire. Lawson enlisted Robert Williams, who had been principal managing owner of Lord Holland on Lawson's voyage, to become principal managing director of Locko.

The EIC took Locko into service in 1780.

== EIC voyage #1 (1781-83) ==
Captain Patrick Lawson sailed Locko from Portsmouth on 13 March 1781, bound for Bombay and China. Locko was part of a convoy of Indiamen accompanying a British squadron under Commodore George Johnstone.

Locko and the convoy reached São Tiago on 10 April. Six days later, Locko was present at the Battle of Porto Praya, when a French squadron under the Bailli de Suffren attacked Johnstone. Both squadrons were en route to the Cape of Good Hope, the British to take it from the Dutch, the French aiming to help defend it and French possessions in the Indian Ocean. The British convoy and its escorting squadron had anchored at Porto Praya (now Praia) in the Cape Verde Islands to take on water, when the French squadron arrived and attacked them at anchor. Due to the unexpected nature of the encounter, neither fleet was prepared to do battle, and the result was an inconclusive battle in which the French warships sustained more damage than did the British. The French did capture the Indiamen Hinchinbrooke (recaptured the next day), and Fortitude, and the victualer Edward, and gained a strategic victory, because Suffren beat Johnstone to the Cape and reinforced the Dutch garrison before continuing on his journey to the Ile de France (now Mauritius). Still, Johnstone went on to capture five Dutch East Indiamen and destroy a sixth at the battle of Saldanha Bay on 21 July.

Locko, reached the Cape region on 22 July. (Note: The National Archives reports that Locko reached "Hollis Bay". Unfortunately, it is not clear where Hollis Bay is. This is probably a transcription error.) She then sailed to Johanna, which she reached on 2 September. The convoy left Johanna on 21 or 22 September, but ran into an adverse monsoon that drove the vessels to the coast of Arabia, and especially the four Indiamen Asia, Latham, Locko, and Osterley were driven further, to Kissen Bay, near the Bab-el-Mandeb. The Indiamen were carrying the 2nd Battalion of the 42nd (Highland) Regiment of Foot. They remained there for some six weeks as the indigenes were friendly and the vessels could procure fresh food. The Highlanders entertained the indigenes with bagpipe music, and danced the Highland Fling; the indigenes reciprocated with a war dance involving shields and spears. The Indiamen arrived at Mocha on 4 December. (Note: Asia's log book puts her at "Qishm" on 5 December. Whether this was Qeshm, and she was not with the other three, or "Kissen Bay" is currently an open question.) They then sailed out of the Red Sea and reached Bombay on 6 March. A voyage that would take a coppered vessel not facing adverse winds about two and a half weeks had taken the Indiamen five and a half months.

Locko left Bombay on 8 August in company with the Indiamen Asia, Essex, and Osterley, and the country ship Shah Byram Gore. (Note: The spelling of the country ship's name varies, sometimes being given as Byram Gore, and sometimes as Byramgore, and preceded, or not, by Shah or Shaw. She was a ship launched at Bombay Dockyard in 1775 and was lost in 1785. She provides the cover illustration to the book by Bulley (2000), which also has some information on her and her successors, all named for a legendary king of Persia. The cover illustration suggests that she was three-masted, and armed with 18 guns.) As the squadron was sailing through the Strait of Malacca, on 9 September the ships encountered the 38-gun French frigate Pourvoyeuse, which was under the command of Lieutenant de Lannuguy-Tromelin. (Note: Lannuguy-Tromelin was the younger brother of Captain de Tromelin, who in 1779 had captured the previous Osterley.) After an engagement the next day that lasted some two and a half hours and in which Osterley had two men killed, and Locko and Essex had several men injured from exploding cartridges, Pouvoyeuse withdrew.

On 4 October Locko reached Whampoa anchorage. She was at the Second Bar on 20 December.

On 4 January 1783, Locko, Osterley, and Asia left Whampoa. On 22 January Locko parted company with Essex and Osterley in the straits of Lombon by one account, and on the 23rd near Caremata (1°37′S 108°53′E), by another account. Locko and Asia then parted company on 30 January at "St Clement's Bank Peels Morcop". These are probably "St Clement's Reef" and "Pulo Mancap", at the lower end of the Karimata Strait. (Note: These areas or places are difficult to identify today. One set of coordinates places Pulo Mancap at 3°5′S 110°11′E), but there is no island (pulao) there. Pulo Mancap may simply be a designation for the SW corner of Borneo. The same source identifies Pulo Mancap Shoal a little to the south, approximately where earlier sources had placed St Clement's Bank.)

Locko arrived at St Helena on 10 May, and brought in with her the French brigantine Anna Maria, of 120 tons (bm), which Locko had captured on 2 May. The capture of Anna Maria gave rise to a court case in which her master, Georgius Bassett, contested the seizure. He appealed to the Lords Commissioners of Appeals in Prize Causes from the decision by the Court of Admiralty of England.

Locko reached Cork on 14 August and arrived at the Downs on 21 September. Once again a member of his ship's crew denounced Lawson for smuggling; leading the Court of Exchequer to fine him £100,000. Instead of paying, Lawson fled to Vizagapatam, where he lived until his death on 10 October 1820, aged 76 years. At Vizagapatam Lawson had prospered as a free (i.e., not EIC-affiliated) merchant.

== EIC voyage #2 (1785-1786) ==
Captain John Baird left Torbay on 12 February 1785, bound for China. Locko arrived at Whampoa on 14 August. Homeward bound, she crossed the Second Bar on 24 November. She reached St Helena on 24 March 1786 and arrived at the Downs on 20 June.

== EIC voyage #3 (1787-88) ==
Baird and Locko left the Downs on 6 January 1787, bound for Bombay and China, and reached Lisbon on 23 January, a stop made necessary by the need for repairs to her topmast and rigging, damaged in the Bay of Biscay. She sailed again in about ten days. She reached Johanna on 20 May and Bombay on 16 June Bombay. She arrived at Whampoa on 23 October. Homeward bound, she crossed the Second Bar on 6 March 1788 and reached St Helena on 31 July. At some point Captain Charles Samways replaced Baird as by the time Locko was at St Helena, Samways was her captain. He had been her first officer under Baird.

Locko left St Helena on 19 August in company with the Walsingham, but the two vessels parted company on 9 September in a gale. Because of the storm Locko had to throw her guns overboard, as well as some water casks and 100 chests of tea. On 21 October Samways arrived at East India House to announce that she had arrived safely at Plymouth. She arrived at the Downs on 14 November.

== Fate ==
Locko was surveyed on her return. Her owners decided that she was not worth repairing and sold her for breaking up.
