= Pulau Pisang (Johor) =

Island in Pontian District, Johor, Malaysia

Native name: ڤولاو ڤيسڠ
- Interactive map of Pulau Pisang

Geography
- Location: Strait of Malacca
- Coordinates: 1°28′03″N 103°15′17″E
- Archipelago: Pisang Islands
- Area: 1.4 km^{2} (0.54 sq mi)

Administration
- Malaysia
- State: Johor
- District: Pontian
- Mukim: Pontian

Pulau Pisang (Banana Island) is a small island in Pontian District, Johor, Malaysia, situated about 12 kilometres from the town of Pontian Kechil and 5 kilometres from Benut town. It is the site of the Pulau Pisang Lighthouse, a lighthouse guiding ships into the western entrance of the busy Singapore Strait. Singapore currently operates the lighthouse, and the country has publicly announced recognition that the island is Malaysian territory.

== Acknowledgement of the island's sovereignty ==
In 2003, Minister for foreign affairs of Singapore, S. Jayakumar, acknowledged that sovereignty of Pulau Pisang is with Malaysia and had never disputed that sovereignty. He also maintained that the management of Pulau Pisang Lighthouse should remain with Singapore.

In 2010, the government of Johor stated that Pulau Pisang is part of the Johor sultanate and would be gazetted as such.

== Pisang Islands ==
Pulau Pisang and three nearby islets form the Pisang Islands Group.

| Island | Area (km^{2}) |
|---|---|
| Pisang | 1.400 |
| Sauh | 0.114 |
| Kemudi | 0.076 |
| Tunda | 0.056 |
| Total | 1.646 |

== See also ==
- Action of 10 September 1782
