= Pulau Pisang Lighthouse =

Lighthouse in Malaysia

Pulau Peesang Lighthouse Rumah Api Pulau Pisang
- Location: Pulau Pisang, Johor, Malaysia
- Coordinates: 1°28′10″N 103°15′21″E

Tower
- Constructed: 1914
- Construction: cast iron (tower)
- Height: 16 m (52 ft)
- Shape: cylindrical tower with balcony and lantern
- Markings: White
- Operator: Maritime and Port Authority of Singapore

Light
- Focal height: 150 m (490 ft)
- Lens: first order Fresnel lens (–Unknown), fourth order Fresnel lens
- Characteristic: Fl W 10s

The Pulau Pisang Lighthouse (Malay: Rumah Api Pulau Pisang) is a lighthouse located on the highest point of Pulau Pisang, an island in the Strait of Malacca 15 kilometres from Pontian Kechil, Johor, Malaysia.

Built in 1914, the lighthouse was constructed as a white 16 metre (52 feet) high circular cast iron tower with one support structure and a single storey keeper's house at the base. As of 2008, its functions remains as an aid for maritime navigation into the western entrance of the Singapore Strait. Due to its isolated location, the lighthouse is only reachable via boat and an access road.

== History ==
While the island where the lighthouse stands belongs to Johor, the lighthouse is operated by the Maritime and Port Authority of Singapore (MPA). This is due to an agreement signed in 1900 between Sultan Ibrahim of Johor and Sir James Alexander Sweethenham, Governor of the Straits Settlements, stating that the island belonged to Johor, while the British government of Singapore (at the time part of the Straits Settlements) had the rights to the plot of land on which the lighthouse stands and the roadway leading to it.

When Singapore separated from Malaysia in 1965, Malaysia took over the island while management of the lighthouse remains with Singapore. Since 1974, instructions to the lighthouse keeper is that no ensign is to be flown at the lighthouse.

Since 2002, to maintain sovereignty over the island by Malaysia, lighthouse keepers and maintenance workers from MPA had to clear Malaysia's customs at Kukup in Johor before heading to Pulau Pisang. Before 2002, there was no such requirement.

In 2003, the Minister for Foreign Affairs of Singapore, S. Jayakumar, acknowledged that sovereignty of Pulau Pisang is with Malaysia and its sovereignty was never disputed. He also maintained that the management of the Pulau Pisang Lighthouse should remain with Singapore.

== See also ==
- List of lighthouses in Malaysia
