= Droit =

Archaic term for rights in captured property

A droit (French for right or Law) is a legal title, claim or due.

== Droits of admiralty (English law) ==
The term is used in English law in the phrase "droits of admiralty". This refers to certain customary rights or perquisites, formerly belonging to the Lord High Admiral, but now to the crown, for public purposes and paid into the Exchequer. These droits (see also wreck) consisted of flotsam, jetsam, ligan - (goods or wreckage on the sea bed that is attached to a buoy so that it can be recovered), treasure, deodand, derelict (maritime), within the admiral's jurisdiction; all fines, forfeitures, ransoms, recognizances and pecuniary punishments; all sturgeons, whales, porpoises, dolphins, grampuses and such large fishes; all ships and goods of the enemy coming into any creek, road or port, by durance or mistake; all ships seized at sea, salvage, etc., with the share of prizes such shares being afterwards called "tenths", in imitation of the French, who gave their admiral a droit de dixième. The droits of admiralty were definitely surrendered for the benefit of the public by Prince George of Denmark, when Lord High Admiral of England in 1702. American law does not recognize any such droits, and the disposition of captured property is regulated by various acts of Congress.

== Other legal connexions (French law, etc.) ==
The term droit is also used in various legal connexions (i.e., French law), such as the droit of angary, the droit d'achat (right of pre-emption) in the case of contraband, the feudal droit de bris (see wreck), the droit de regale or ancient royal privilege of claiming the revenues and patronage of a vacant bishopric, and the feudal droites of seignory generally.

In French, droit can mean the whole body of the Law, as in the motto "dieu et mon droit", which is to say "God and my whole body of Law." Droit d'auteur is a term for French copyright law.
