= Argonaut (disambiguation) =

An Argonaut is a hero in Greek mythology.

Argonaut or Argonauts may also refer to:

== Transportation ==
- Argonaut, a 1961 yacht build by Trojan Yachts
- Argonaut (submarine), a class of submarines built by engineer Simon Lake
- USS Argonaut, several submarines of the United States Navy
- HMS Argonaut, several ships of the Royal Navy
- SS Argonaut, a cargo ship
- Argonaut (train), a train operated between Los Angeles and New Orleans
- Argonaut (aircraft), a variant of the Canadair North Star airliner
- Argonaut (automobile), an American automobile manufactured from 1959 to 1963

== Companies ==
- Argonaut Games, a British video game company
- Argonaut Mine, a defunct gold mine in Jackson, California
- Argonaut Resources, Australian mining company drilling for minerals at Lake Torrens, South Australia

== Publications ==
- The Argonaut, a former literary journal based in San Francisco
- The Argonaut, the student newspaper of the University of Idaho
- The Argonaut, a community newspaper in Los Angeles published by Southland Publishing
- The Argonauts, a 2015 book by Maggie Nelson

== Sports ==
- Argonauts F.C., an amateur football club based in London
- Argonaut Rowing Club, a rowing club in Toronto, Ontario
- Toronto Argonauts, a team in the Canadian Football League
- Antwerp Argonauts, an amateur American football team based in Antwerp, Belgium
- West Florida Argonauts, collegiate football team, former NCAA Division 2 Champions, based in Pensacola, Florida.

== Other uses ==
- Argonaut (animal), pelagic octopuses of the genus Argonauta
- Argonaut Conference, the code name for the Yalta Conference, a 1945 wartime meeting between Franklin D. Roosevelt, Winston Churchill, and Joseph Stalin
- Argonaut, a person who took part in the California Gold Rush
- Argonaut High School, a high school in Jackson, California, named for the nearby Argonaut Mine
- Argonaut, a member of the Argonauts Club, an Australian children's radio program
- Argonauts of Saint Nicholas, a military order in Naples
- Argonaut class reactor, a type of small nuclear research reactor
- Argonaut Island, local name Ulleungdo, a South Korean island
- VFA-147, a United States Navy squadron
- Argonaut Building, an office building in Detroit, Michigan
- "Argonaut", code name assigned to Ron "Captain Clarinet" Peterson in the comic book series PS238
- Argonaut, a fictional spaceship in the anime series Heroic Age
- Argonaut (lunar lander)

== See also ==
- Argonauta (disambiguation)
- Argonaute, a family of proteins
- French ship Argonaute, several French Navy ships
- Argonotes, the unofficial band of the Toronto Argonauts
- Dragonaut: The Resonance, an anime series
- Uronautes, a dubious genus of extinct plesiosaur
