= Argonauta =

Argonauta may refer to:

== Animals ==
- Argonaut (animal), molluscs of the genus Argonauta
- Aprominta argonauta, a species of moth
- Asterias argonauta, a species of starfish
- Dentimargo argonauta, a species of sea snail
- Dorcadion sulcipenne argonauta, a subspecies of the beetle species Dorcadion sulcipenne

== Ships ==
- Argonauta-class submarine, a class of submarines of the Italian Navy
- Italian submarine Argonauta, two submarines of the Italian Navy
- Spanish ship Argonauta, various ships of the Spanish Navy

== See also ==
- Argonaut (disambiguation)
- Argonaute
- French ship Argonaute
