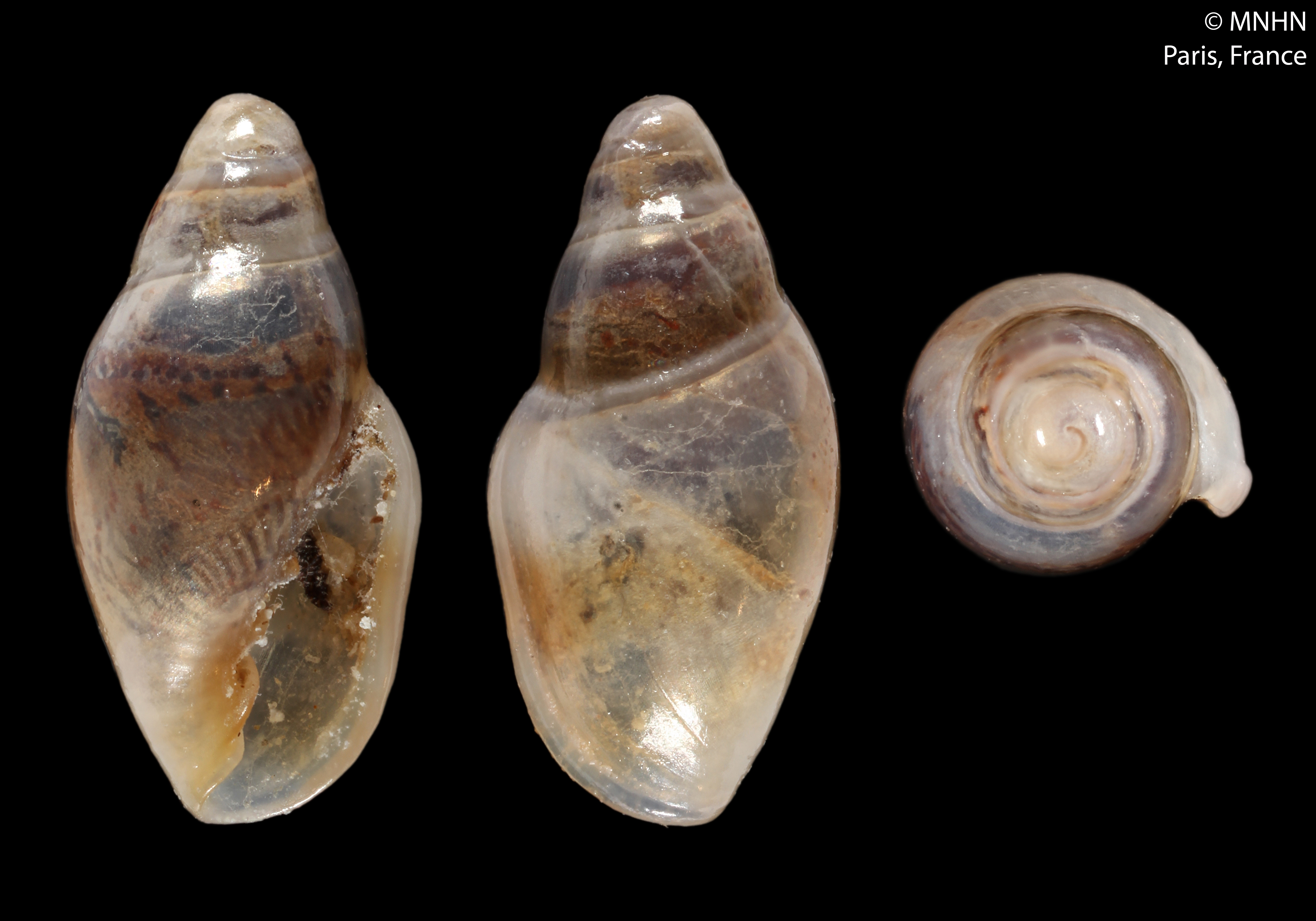
- Shell of Dentimargo aliguayensis (holotype at MNHN, Paris)

Scientific classification
- Kingdom: Animalia
- Phylum: Mollusca
- Class: Gastropoda
- Subclass: Caenogastropoda
- Order: Neogastropoda
- Family: Marginellidae
- Subfamily: Marginellinae
- Genus: Dentimargo; Cossmann, 1899

Type species
- Dentimargo dentifera Lamarck, J.B.P.A. de, 1803

Synonyms
- Longinella Laseron, 1957 (non Gros & Lestage, 1927); Marginella (Dentimargo) Cossmann, 1899 (original rank); Marginella (Eburnospira) Olsson & Harbison, 1953; Marginella (Volvarinella) Habe, 1951; Marginellona (Eburnospira) Olsson & Harbison, 1953; Volvarinella Habe, 1951; Volvarinella (Eburnospira) Pacaud & Le Renard, 1995

= Dentimargo =

Genus of sea snails

Dentimargo is a genus of sea snails, marine gastropod mollusks in the family Marginellidae, the margin snails.

== Species ==
Species within the genus Dentimargo include:

- Dentimargo aggressorum Cossignani & Lorenz, 2018
- Dentimargo alchymista Melvill & Standen, 1903
- Dentimargo aliguayensis Bozzetti, 2017
- Dentimargo alisae Boyer, 2001
- Dentimargo allporti Tenison-Woods, 1876
- † Dentimargo altispira (May, 1922)
- Dentimargo altus Watson, 1886
- Dentimargo amoenus (Suter, 1908)
- Dentimargo anticleus (Dall, 1919)
- Dentimargo argonauta Espinosa & Ortea, 2002
- Dentimargo arvinus Laseron, 1957
- Dentimargo auratus Espinosa, Ortea & Moro, 2014
- Dentimargo aureocinctus (Stearns, 1872)
- Dentimargo balicasagensis Cossignani, 2001
- Dentimargo basareoi Espinosa, Ortea & Moro, 2012
- Dentimargo bavayi Espinosa, Ortea & Moro, 2011
- Dentimargo bifurcatus Boyer, 2017
- Dentimargo binotatus (Sykes, 1905)
- Dentimargo biocal Boyer, 2002
- Dentimargo bojadorensis Thiele, 1925
- Dentimargo cairoma (Brookes, 1924)
- Dentimargo caribbaeus Espinosa & Ortea, 2015
- Dentimargo chaperi Jousseaume, 1875
- Dentimargo cingulatus Boyer, 2002
- Dentimargo clarus Thiele, 1925
- Dentimargo claroi Espinosa, Fernandez-Garcès & Ortea, 2004
- Dentimargo cruzmoralai Espinosa & Ortea, 2000
- Dentimargo debruini Cossignani, 1998
- Dentimargo delphinicus Bavay, 1920
- Dentimargo dentatus Lussi & G. Smith, 1996
- Dentimargo dentiens (May, 1911)
- Dentimargo dianae Lussi & G. Smith, 1996
- Dentimargo didieri Espinosa & Ortea, 2013
- Dentimargo dimidius Garrard, 1966
- Dentimargo dispoliatus Bavay, 1922
- Dentimargo eburneolus (Conrad, 1834)
- Dentimargo elatus Watson, 1886
- Dentimargo elpilar Espinosa & Ortea, 2018
- † Dentimargo elusiva Sosso, Brunetti & Dell'Angelo, 2015
- Dentimargo epacrodonta Roth, 1978
- Dentimargo eremus Dall, 1919
- Dentimargo esther (Dall, 1927)
- Dentimargo exquisitus Boyer, 2017
- Dentimargo fortis Laseron, 1957
- Dentimargo fusiformis (Hinds, 1844)
- Dentimargo fusinus (Dall, 1881)
- Dentimargo fusulus (Murdoch & Suter, 1906)
- Dentimargo fusuloides (Dell, 1956)
- Dentimargo galindoensis Espinosa, Moro & Ortea, 2011
- Dentimargo gibbus Garcia, 2006
- Dentimargo giovannii Pérez-Dionis, Espinosa & Ortea, 2014
- Dentimargo grandidietti Cossignani, 2001
- Dentimargo guionneti Cossignani, 2001
- Dentimargo habanensis Espinosa, Ortea & Moro, 2012
- Dentimargo hebescens (Murdoch & Suter, 1906)
- Dentimargo hennequini Cossignani, 2004
- Dentimargo hesperia (Sykes, 1905)
- Dentimargo idiochilus Schwengel, 1943
- Dentimargo imitator (Dall, 1927)
- Dentimargo incessa (Dall, 1927)
- Dentimargo jaffa Cotton, 1944
- Dentimargo janae T. Cossignani, 2011
- Dentimargo jeanmartinii Cossignani, 2008
- Dentimargo kawamurai (Habe, 1951)
- Dentimargo kemblensis (Hedley, 1903)
- Dentimargo kevini Cossignani, 2004
- Dentimargo kicoi Espinosa & Ortea, 2015
- Dentimargo lantzi (Jousseaume, 1875)
- Dentimargo lodderae (May, 1911)
- Dentimargo luridus (Suter, 1908)
- Dentimargo macnairi (Bavay, 1922)
- Dentimargo makiyamai (Habe, 1951)
- Dentimargo mayabequensis Espinosa & Ortea, 2015
- Dentimargo mayii (Tate, 1900)
- Dentimargo montrouzieri Boyer, 2003
- Dentimargo nauticus Espinosa, Ortea & Moro, 2012
- Dentimargo neglectus G.B. Sowerby II, 1846
- Dentimargo osmayi Espinosa & Ortea, 2014
- Dentimargo perexilis (Bavay, 1922)
- Dentimargo pumilus Redfield, 1869
- Dentimargo quilonicus (Melvill, 1898)
- Dentimargo ratzingeri Cossignani, 2006
- Dentimargo redferni Espinosa, Ortea & Moro, 2012
- Dentimargo reductus (Bavay, 1922)
- Dentimargo repentinus Sikes, 1905
- † Dentimargo rhytidobasis (Lozouet, 1999)
- Dentimargo ringicula G.B. Sowerby III, 1901
- Dentimargo rivesi Espinosa & Ortea, 2013
- Dentimargo rogeri Espinosa & Ortea, 2014
- Dentimargo scapulatus Boyer, 2017
- Dentimargo slateri Lussi & G. Smith, 2015
- Dentimargo smithii (A. E. Verrill, 1885)
- Dentimargo somalicus Cossignani, 2001
- Dentimargo spengleri Lussi, 2007
- Dentimargo spongiarum Boyer, 2001
- Dentimargo stewartiana (Suter, 1908)
- Dentimargo suavis (Souverbie, 1859)
- Dentimargo subamoenus (Powell, 1937)
- Dentimargo subfusulus (Powell, 1932)
- Dentimargo subventricosior (Souverbie, 1863)
- Dentimargo tanorus (Dall, 1927)
- Dentimargo teramachi Habe, 1951
- Dentimargo tillmanni Espinosa & Ortea, 2013
- Dentimargo tonyi Espinosa & Ortea, 2014
- Dentimargo totomiensis Makiyama, 1927
- Dentimargo tropicensis Boyer, 2002
- Dentimargo tropicus (Laseron, 1957)
- Dentimargo undulatus Boyer, 2017
- Dentimargo vincenzoi Cossignani, 2001
- Dentimargo virginiae Boyer, 2001
- Dentimargo vitoria Espinosa & Ortea, 2005
- Dentimargo walkeri E.A. Smith, 1899
- Dentimargo wormaldi (Powell, 1971)
- Dentimargo yucatecana (Dall, 1881)
- Dentimargo zaidettae Espinosa & Ortea, 2000
- Dentimargo zanzibaricus Bozzetti, 1997
- Dentimargo zetetes Roth, 1978

Species brought into synonymy

- Dentimargo boyeri Bozzetti, 1994: synonym of Eratoidea boyeri (Bozzetti, 1994)
- Dentimargo cecalupoi Cossignani, 2005: synonym of Demissa cecalupoi (Cossignani, 2005) (original combination)
- Dentimargo costulata Thiele, 1925: synonym of Eratoidea costulata (Thiele, 1925)
- Dentimargo janeiroensis E.A. Smith, 1915: synonym of Eratoidea janeiroensis (E. A. Smith, 1915)
- Dentimargo lateritius (Melvill & Sykes, 1903): synonym of Marginella lateritia Melvill & Sykes, 1903
- Dentimargo procrita (Kilburn, 1977): synonym of Demissa procrita (Kilburn, 1977)
- Dentimargo sinuosa Bozzetti, 1997: synonym of Eratoidea sinuosa (Bozzetti, 1997)
- Dentimargo stylaster Boyer, 2001: synonym of Serrata stylaster (Boyer, 2001)
- Dentimargo sulcata d' Orbigny, 1842: synonym of Eratoidea sulcata (d'Orbigny, 1842)
