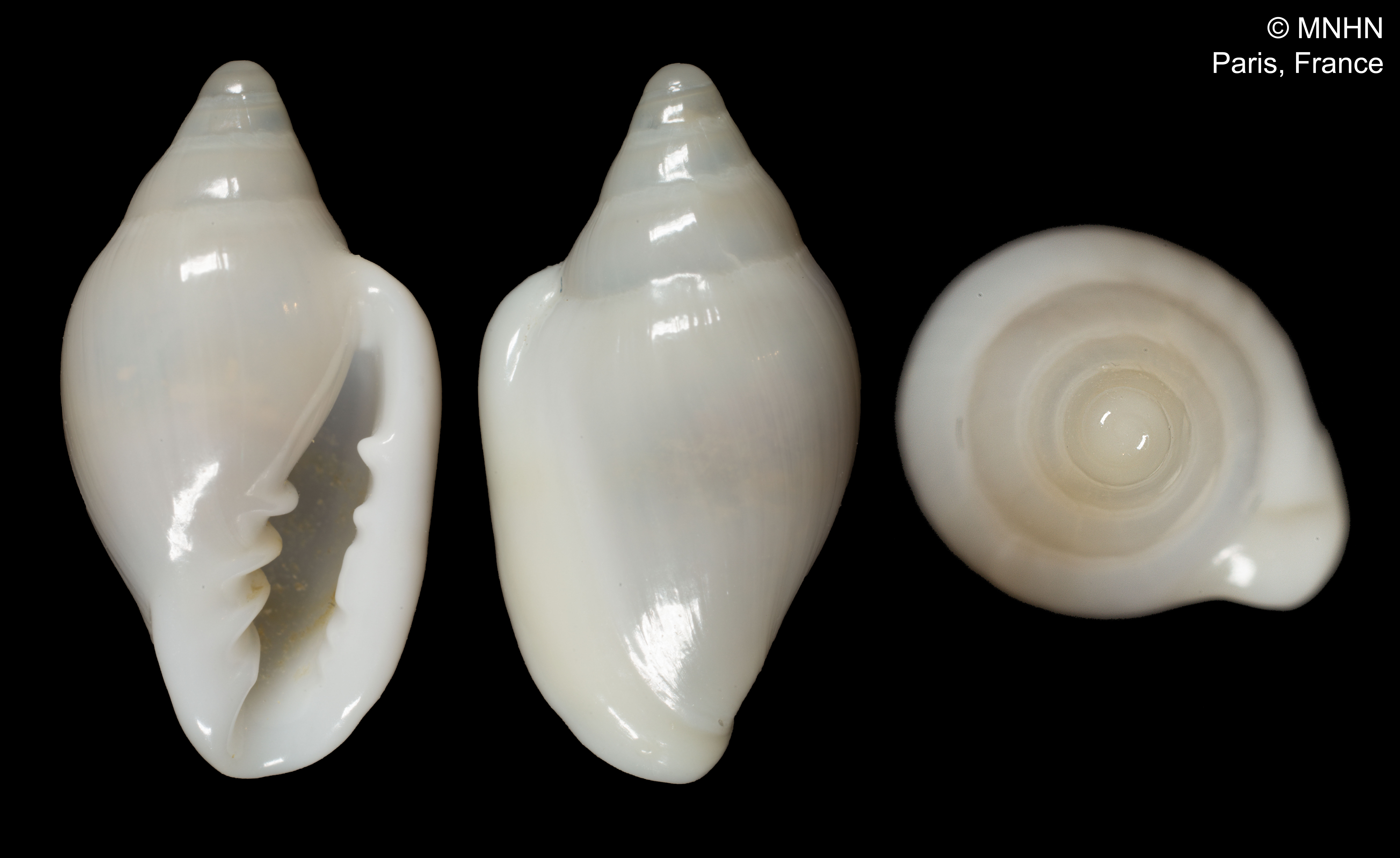
- Shell of Dentimargo grandidietti (holotype at MNHN, Paris)

Scientific classification
- Kingdom: Animalia
- Phylum: Mollusca
- Class: Gastropoda
- Subclass: Caenogastropoda
- Order: Neogastropoda
- Family: Marginellidae
- Genus: Dentimargo
- Species: D. grandidietti

Binomial name
- Dentimargo grandidietti Cossignani, 2001

= Dentimargo grandidietti =

Species of gastropod

Dentimargo grandidietti is a species of sea snail, a marine gastropod mollusc in the family Marginellidae, the margin snails.

== Distribution ==
This marine species occurs off New Caledonia.
