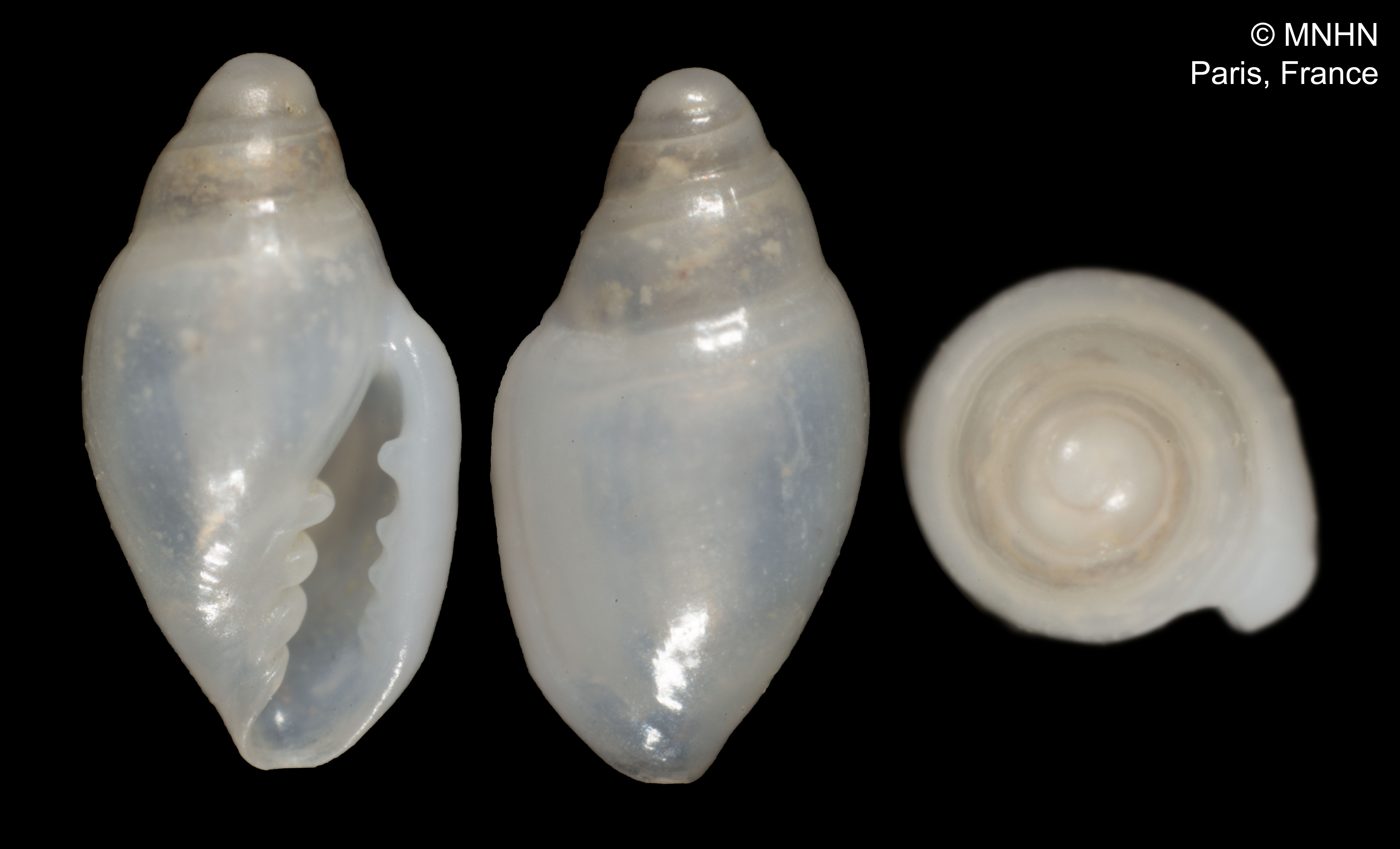
- Shell of Dentimargo reductus (syntype at MNHN, Paris)

Scientific classification
- Kingdom: Animalia
- Phylum: Mollusca
- Class: Gastropoda
- Subclass: Caenogastropoda
- Order: Neogastropoda
- Family: Marginellidae
- Genus: Dentimargo
- Species: D. reductus

Binomial name
- Dentimargo reductus (Bavay, 1922)

Synonyms
- Marginella reducta Bavay, 1922 (basionym)

= Dentimargo reductus =

Species of gastropod

Dentimargo reductus is a species of sea snail, a marine gastropod mollusc in the family Marginellidae, the margin snails.

== Distribution ==
This species occurs in the Caribbean Sea and the Gulf of Mexico.
