= Dentimargo yucatecana =

Scientific classification
- Kingdom: Animalia
- Phylum: Mollusca
- Class: Gastropoda
- Subclass: Caenogastropoda
- Order: Neogastropoda
- Family: Marginellidae
- Genus: Dentimargo
- Species: D. yucatecana

Binomial name
- Dentimargo yucatecana (Dall, 1881)

Synonyms
- Dentimargo yucatecanus (Dall, 1881) (incorrect gender ending); Marginella yucatecana Dall, 1881; Prunum yucatecanum (Dall, 1881)

Species of gastropod

Dentimargo yucatecana is a species of sea snail, a marine gastropod mollusc in the family Marginellidae, the margin snails.
