= Dentimargo smithii =

Scientific classification
- Kingdom: Animalia
- Phylum: Mollusca
- Class: Gastropoda
- Subclass: Caenogastropoda
- Order: Neogastropoda
- Family: Marginellidae
- Genus: Dentimargo
- Species: D. smithii

Binomial name
- Dentimargo smithii (A. E. Verrill, 1885)

Species of gastropod

Dentimargo smithii is a species of sea snail, a marine gastropod mollusk in the family Marginellidae, the margin snails.
