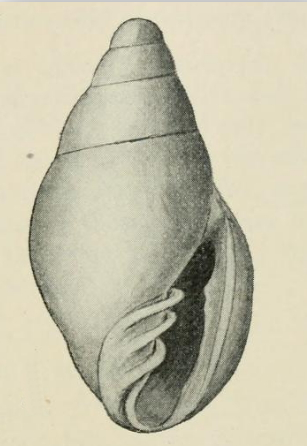
- Shell of Dentimargo altispira (holotype)

Scientific classification
- Kingdom: Animalia
- Phylum: Mollusca
- Class: Gastropoda
- Subclass: Caenogastropoda
- Order: Neogastropoda
- Family: Marginellidae
- Subfamily: Marginellinae
- Genus: Dentimargo
- Species: †D. altispira

Binomial name
- †Dentimargo altispira (May, 1922)

Synonyms
- † Marginella altispira May, 1922 † ·

= Dentimargo altispira =

Extinct species of gastropod

Dentimargo altispira is an extinct species of sea snail, a marine gastropod mollusk in the family Borsoniidae.

== Description ==
The length of the shell attains 5 mm, its diameter 3 mm.

(Original description) The broadly fusiform shell has a tall, blunt-topped spire. It contains four, moderately rounded whorls. The spire and the aperture are of about equal length. The aperture is small. The columella is concave, bearing four strong teeth, which extend about two-thirds up the columella, and extend well out on to the base of the shell. The outer lip is very massively thickened, much rounded, with a strong tubercle within, placed near the upper third.

== Distribution ==
This extinct marine species is endemic to Tasmania and were found in Tertiary strata.
