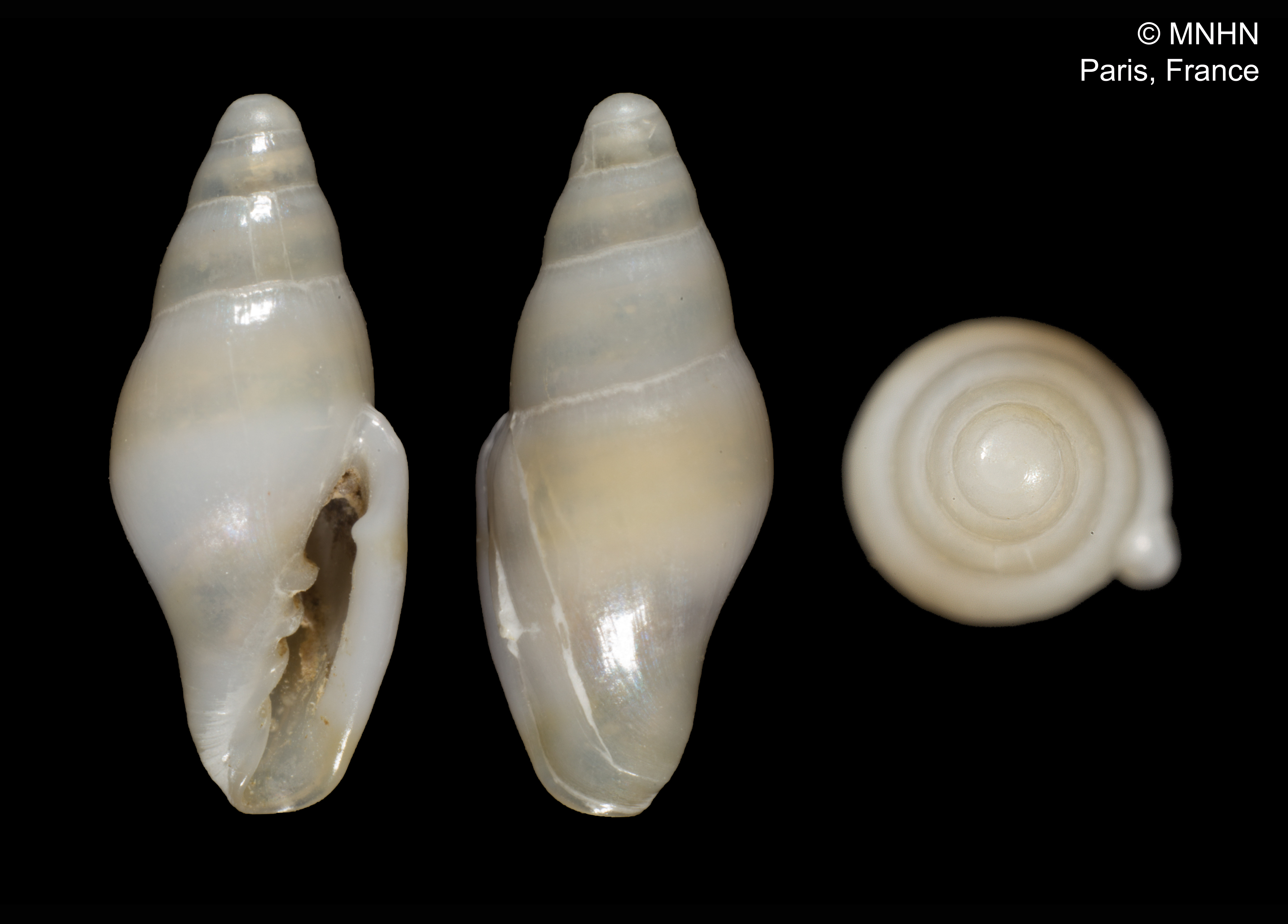
- Shell of Dentimargo alisae (holotype at MNHN, Paris)

Scientific classification
- Kingdom: Animalia
- Phylum: Mollusca
- Class: Gastropoda
- Subclass: Caenogastropoda
- Order: Neogastropoda
- Family: Marginellidae
- Genus: Dentimargo
- Species: D. alisae

Binomial name
- Dentimargo alisae Boyer, 2001

= Dentimargo alisae =

Species of gastropod

Dentimargo alisae is a species of sea snail, a marine gastropod mollusc in the family Marginellidae, the margin snails.

== Distribution ==
This marine species was found on the Norfolk Ridge.
