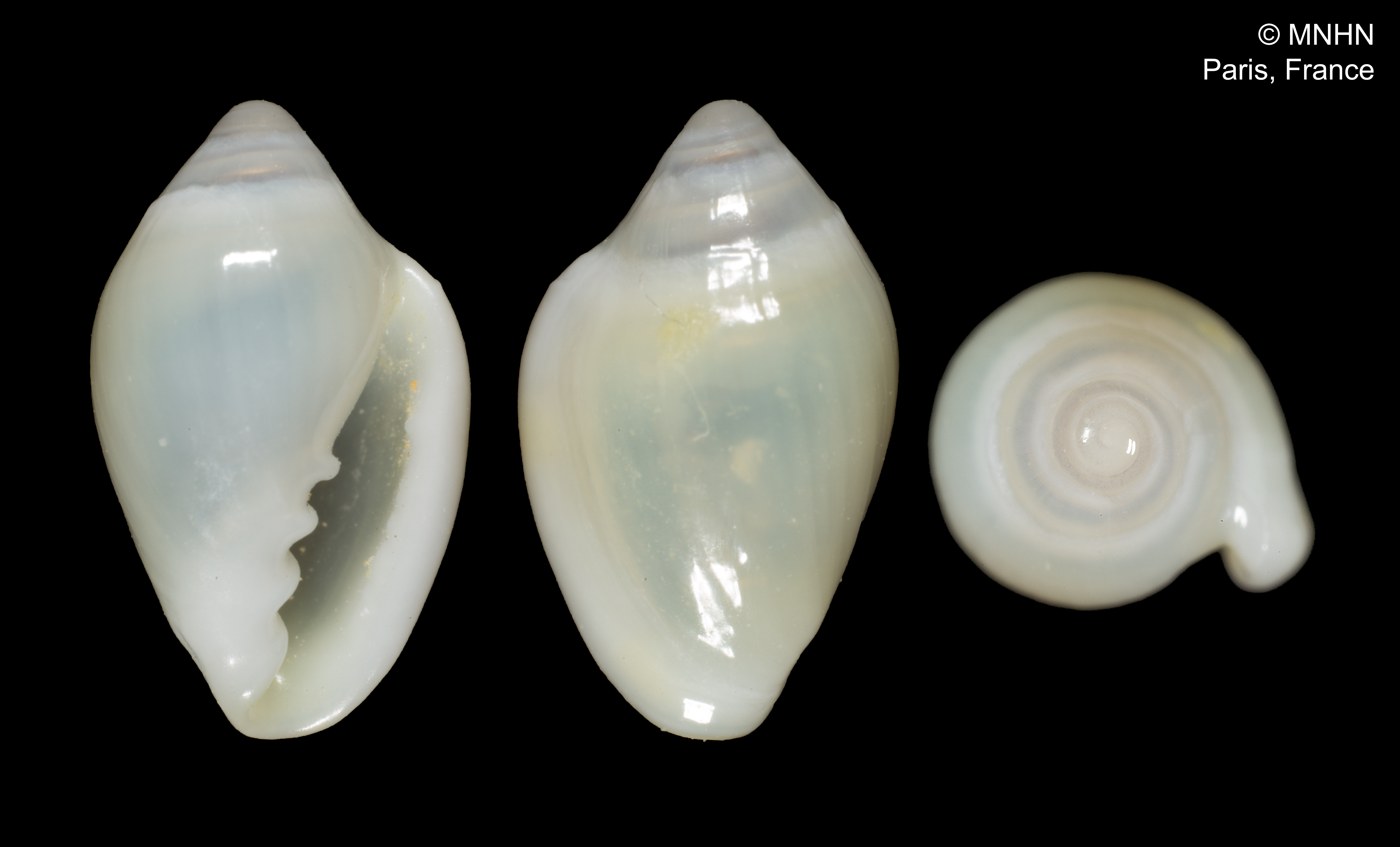
- Shell of Dentimargo biocal (holotype at MNHN, Paris)

Scientific classification
- Kingdom: Animalia
- Phylum: Mollusca
- Class: Gastropoda
- Subclass: Caenogastropoda
- Order: Neogastropoda
- Family: Marginellidae
- Genus: Dentimargo
- Species: D. biocal

Binomial name
- Dentimargo biocal Boyer, 2002

= Dentimargo biocal =

Species of gastropod

Dentimargo biocal is a species of sea snail, a marine gastropod mollusc in the family Marginellidae, the margin snails.

== Distribution ==
This marine species occurs off New Caledonia.
