= Dentimargo hennequini =

Scientific classification
- Kingdom: Animalia
- Phylum: Mollusca
- Class: Gastropoda
- Subclass: Caenogastropoda
- Order: Neogastropoda
- Family: Marginellidae
- Genus: Dentimargo
- Species: D. hennequini

Binomial name
- Dentimargo hennequini Cossignani, 2004

Species of gastropod

Dentimargo hennequini is a species of sea snail, a marine gastropod mollusc in the family Marginellidae, the margin snails.
