= Dentimargo ringicula =

Scientific classification
- Kingdom: Animalia
- Phylum: Mollusca
- Class: Gastropoda
- Subclass: Caenogastropoda
- Order: Neogastropoda
- Family: Marginellidae
- Genus: Dentimargo
- Species: D. ringicula

Binomial name
- Dentimargo ringicula G.B. Sowerby III, 1900

Synonyms
- Marginella ringicula G. B. Sowerby III, 1901

Species of gastropod

Dentimargo ringicula is a species of sea snail, a marine gastropod mollusc in the family Marginellidae, the margin snails.
