= Dentimargo spengleri =

Scientific classification
- Kingdom: Animalia
- Phylum: Mollusca
- Class: Gastropoda
- Subclass: Caenogastropoda
- Order: Neogastropoda
- Family: Marginellidae
- Genus: Dentimargo
- Species: D. spengleri

Binomial name
- Dentimargo spengleri Lussi, 2007

Species of gastropod

Dentimargo spengleri is a species of small sea snail, a marine gastropod mollusk or micromollusk in the family Marginellidae, the margin snails.
