= Dentimargo hesperia =

Scientific classification
- Kingdom: Animalia
- Phylum: Mollusca
- Class: Gastropoda
- Subclass: Caenogastropoda
- Order: Neogastropoda
- Family: Marginellidae
- Genus: Dentimargo
- Species: D. hesperia

Binomial name
- Dentimargo hesperia (Sykes, 1905)

Synonyms
- Marginella hesperia Sykes, 1905

Species of gastropod

Dentimargo hesperia is a species of sea snail, a marine gastropod mollusk in the family Marginellidae, the margin snails.
