= Dentimargo somalicus =

Scientific classification
- Kingdom: Animalia
- Phylum: Mollusca
- Class: Gastropoda
- Subclass: Caenogastropoda
- Order: Neogastropoda
- Family: Marginellidae
- Genus: Dentimargo
- Species: D. somalicus

Binomial name
- Dentimargo somalicus Cossignani, 2001

Species of gastropod

Dentimargo somalicus is a species of sea snail, a marine gastropod mollusc in the family Marginellidae, the margin snails.
