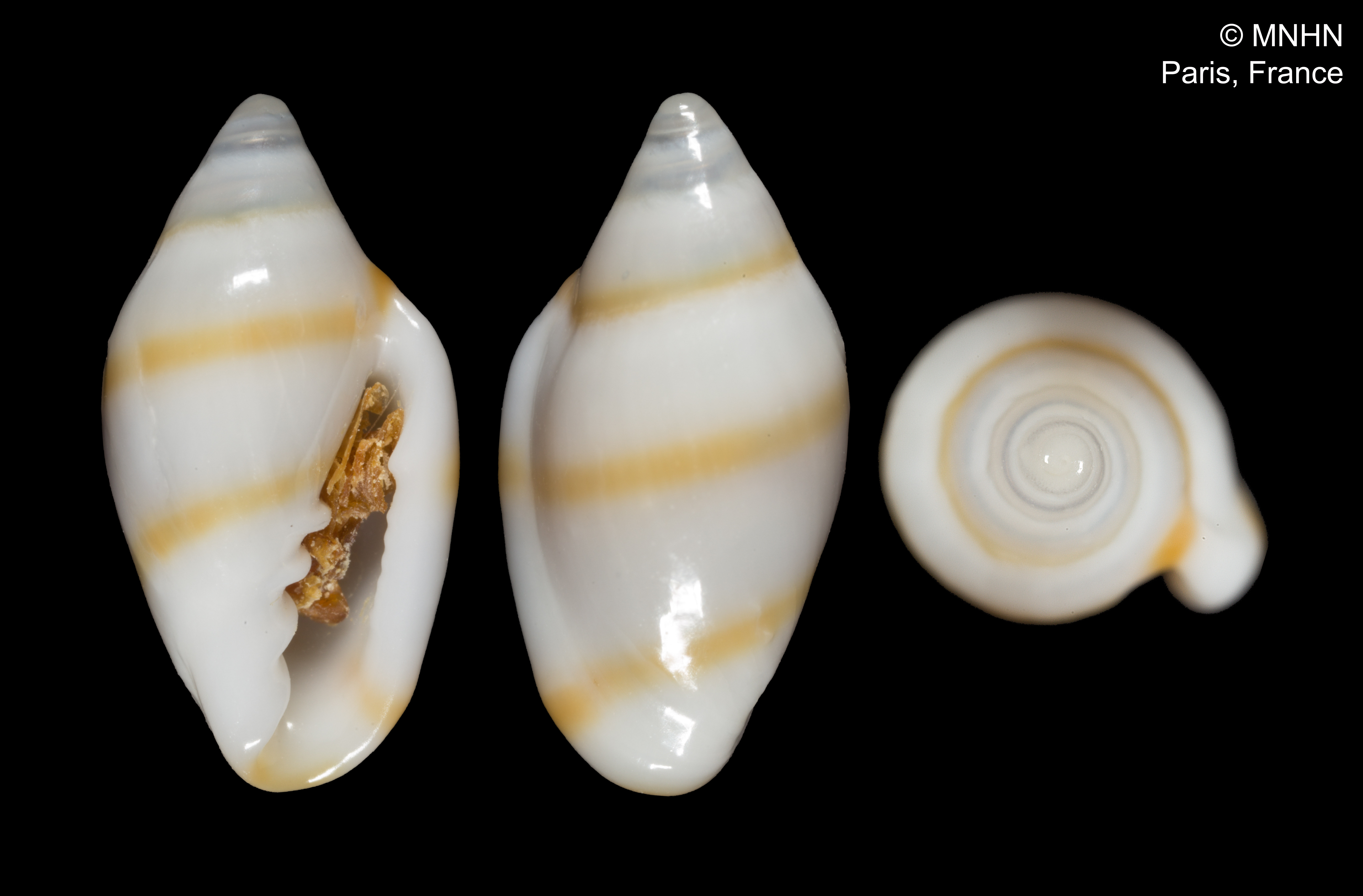
- Shell of Dentimargo cingulatus (holotype at MNHN, Paris)

Scientific classification
- Kingdom: Animalia
- Phylum: Mollusca
- Class: Gastropoda
- Subclass: Caenogastropoda
- Order: Neogastropoda
- Family: Marginellidae
- Genus: Dentimargo
- Species: D. cingulatus

Binomial name
- Dentimargo cingulatus Boyer, 2002

= Dentimargo cingulatus =

Species of gastropod

Dentimargo cingulatus is a species of sea snail, a marine gastropod mollusk in the family Marginellidae, the margin snails.

== Distribution ==
This marine species occurs off New Caledonia.
