= HMS Argonaut =

Four ships of the Royal Navy have been named HMS Argonaut after the Argonauts of Greek mythology:

- HMS Argonaut (1782) was a 64-gun third rate, originally the French ship Jason, captured in 1782 in the West Indies and broken up in 1831.
- HMS Argonaut (1898) was a Diadem-class armoured cruiser launched in 1898 and broken up in 1921.
- HMS Argonaut (61) was a Dido-class light cruiser launched in 1941 and sold in 1955.
- HMS Argonaut (F56) was a Leander-class frigate launched in 1966 and broken up in 1995.

== Battle honours ==
Ships named Argonaut have earned the following battle honours:

- Arctic 1942
- North Africa 1942
- Mediterranean 1942
- Normandy 1944
- Aegean 1944
- Okinawa 1945
- Falkland Islands 1982
