= Marginella lateritia =

Scientific classification
- Kingdom: Animalia
- Phylum: Mollusca
- Class: Gastropoda
- Subclass: Caenogastropoda
- Order: Neogastropoda
- Family: Marginellidae
- Genus: Marginella
- Species: M. lateritia

Binomial name
- Marginella lateritia Melvill & Sykes, 1903

Synonyms
- Dentimargo lateritius (Melvill & Sykes, 1903); Glabella lateritia (Melvill & Sykes, 1903); Marginella (Glabella) lateritia Melvill & Sykes,1903

Species of gastropod

Marginella lateritia is a species of sea snail, a marine gastropod mollusk in the family Marginellidae, the margin snails.

== Distribution ==
This marine species occurs off the Andaman Islands.
