= USS Argonaut =

The name USS Argonaut may refer to the following submarines of the United States Navy:

- USS Argonaut (SM-1), commissioned in 1925 and lost in 1943 during World War II
- USS Argonaut (SS-475), a Tench-class submarine commissioned in 1945 that served during World War II and was sold to Canada in 1968, becoming HMCS Rainbow (SS 75)

== See also ==
- Argonaut (submarine)
