= Argonotes =

Unofficial band of the Toronto Argonauts

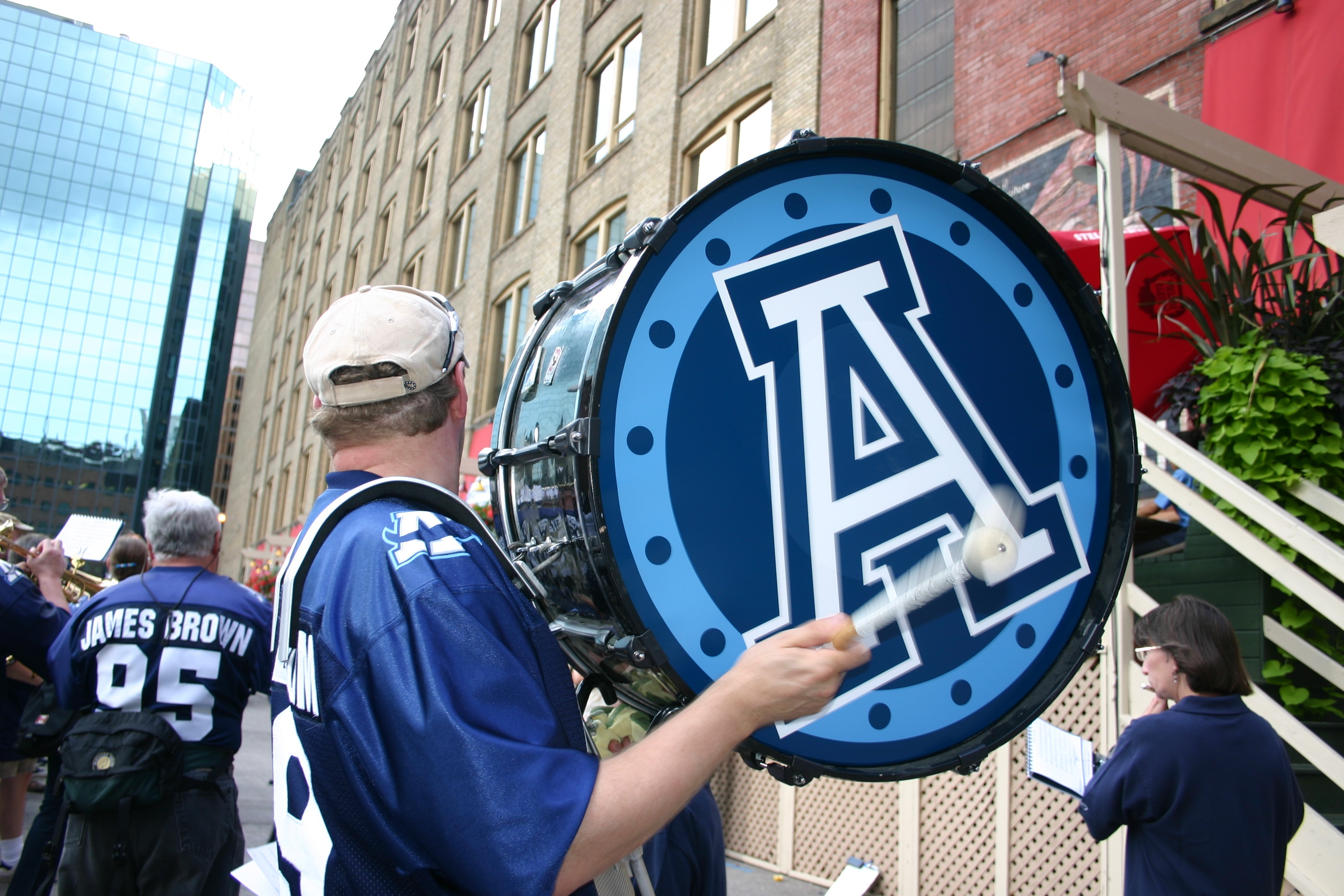
An Argonotes drum

Argonotes, the unofficial band of the Toronto Argonauts, was an all volunteer organization committed to bringing quality musical entertainment and a "traditional football atmosphere" to all Argonauts home football games. Comprising more than 50 musicians on most game days, Argonotes was the largest musical organization associated with the CFL.

In addition to game day duties, the band also stayed active during the off-season by promoting the Argos, Toronto, and the city's pride by taking part in various local events (Leafs, Raptors, Marlies games, fan festivals, etc.).

Occasionally, the band took its show on the road by representing Toronto and its fans in other cities such as Hamilton and Montreal for events such as the 2009 Labour Day Classic and playoff games.

The band disbanded during the 2017 CFL season, reportedly due to a conflict with the Argonauts' organization.

== Band history ==
The Argonotes were the spiritual successors to earlier marching bands associated with the Argonauts over the franchise's long history. The last Argonauts band had dissolved by the 1970s, and only the occasional invited marching band played at half-times of games in the 1980s and early 1990s. The Argonotes era began in 1995, when the band was founded by Steve Hayman. The recruited players were mostly local alumni of the Waterloo, Queen's, Western, U of T, Laurier and McGill university bands, ranging from recent graduates to people who last played in the 1950s.

Highlights from the first decade of the Argonotes
1996 – First road trip, to Hamilton for the 1996 Grey Cup Festival.
1998 – First trip to Montreal for playoff game
1999 – First appearance outside of a Leafs game
2000 – At the request of the Hamilton Tiger-Cats, Argonotes temporarily become the Ticats Band, "Orchestra Wee-Wee", for the Ticats Grey Cup Ring dinner.
2001 – Performing at parties surrounding Grey Cup festivities in Montreal
2002 – Official Band, World Beer Games
2004 – Defeats Roughriders Pep Band in sonic battle at Grey Cup in Ottawa.
2007 – CFL Grey Cup weekend performances in Toronto.

Appearances

- 100th Grey Cup Festival Kickoff (2011)
- Breakfast Television (Citytv Toronto)

== Repertoire ==
Following is some of the Argonotes more frequently performed songs.

- Born to Be Wild
- Louie Louie
- I'm a Believer
- The Magnificent Seven
- Crazy Little Thing Called Love

=== Fight songs ===
The band played a number of pep band tunes common to sporting environments, with a heavy emphasis on songs by Canadian bands or artists. Nautical tunes such as Anchors Aweigh and Row, Row, Row Your Boat were also common.

The team's traditional fight song, popular in the 1950s and 60s and recently rediscovered, was Go Argos Go:

Go Toronto Argos go go go
Pull together fight the foe foe foe
Scoring touchdowns for the blue on blue
The Argos will win for you

Full of fight and courage you can't stop
They pile up the points until they reach the top
Pull together till the Grey Cup's won
Go Argos go go go

Go Toronto Argos go go go
Pull together fight the foe foe foe
Scoring touchdowns for the blue on blue
The Argos will win for you

Full of fight and courage you can't stop
They pile up the points until they reach the top
Pull together till the Grey Cup's won
Go Argos go Toronto go
Go Argos go go go

Another traditional-style fight song played by the band was Argos Rule the CFL, a song written by Tony Daniels and Damon Papadopoulos of Talk 640 Radio shortly before the band's formation:

The Alouettes, Lions and the Blue Bombers
Tiger-Cats, Eskimoes and Stampeders
The Roughriders and the other Rough Riders
But the Argos Rule the CFL
T! O! R! O! N! T! O!
A! R! G! O! N!A!U!T!S!

Note that since the demise of the Ottawa Rough Riders, the third line is now ...and no other Rough Riders.
