= Argonaut (automobile) =

Defunct American motor vehicle manufacturer

The Argonaut was an American automobile manufactured from 1959 to 1963, or at least the company is listed as being in existence during those years. The Argonaut Motor Machine Corporation was based in Cleveland, Ohio. The company's president was Richard S. Luntz (1919–2006).

The company announced its production plans for a line of U.S.-made luxury cars in September 1958, planned as the finest and most luxurious in the world. The prices quoted ranged from a low of $28,600 to a high of $36,000; a variety of stainless and other special steels were proposed for the car's manufacture. A supercharged V-12 ohc aluminum air-cooled engine developing some 1,010 bhp (750 kW) was designed for the Argonaut, and all cars were to carry a four-year guarantee. The company claimed, in its catalogue, that two of its models (the "Smoke" and the "Raceway") had maximum speeds approaching 240 mph.

A number of high tech features were claimed, among them special tires with interwoven strands of steel to withstand sustained speeds of 200 mph, electric shock absorbers (individually adjustable from the cockpit) and 3 independent braking systems.

A news article about the Argonaut announcement appeared in The Washington Post on September 14, 1958, and Popular Science magazine published an article with several illustrations in the January 1959 issue, including a photo of a chassis and engine. A number of local articles also appeared in Cleveland area newspapers over the next few years. The "Spotlight on Detroit" column on page 12 of the December 1958 issue of Motor Trend Magazine (not available online) has pictures of the frame, a few parts including the instrument panel, and drawings of the different proposed body styles.

In a 1987 interview, Luntz said that an influential group of backers "felt that to put Italian bodies on an American chassis would infuriate the steel companies". In one article, these Italian coachbuilders were stated to be Bertone and Touring. Luntz also stated that 3 Argonaut prototypes were built, but all research since has only verified one surviving example: a 392 cubic inch Chrysler marine V-8 engine and 3-speed manual overdrive transmission mounted in a custom-built rolling chassis, but without any body. This is the chassis that was publicly displayed and pictured in newspaper accounts of the period, and was listed (with photo) in an auction catalog from the late 1970s, then owned by a private New York State collector.

The Blackhawk Museum in Danville, California, featured a complete Argonaut automobile from 1988 up to about 1997, but this vehicle's appearance bears only a vague resemblance to the Argonaut Raceaway. Rather, its beautifully finished boattail speedster body is more akin to a low-slung mid-1930s Duesenberg. This speedster may have been built on the 'show' chassis; Blackhawk literature makes reference to a '240-MPH speedometer' and a chassis that is a 'formidable feat of engineering'. As of 2005, the Blackhawk Museum was unaware of this car's whereabouts. Two brief Facebook videos posted in 2017 show the boattail backing out of a shipping container in Japan and driving away.
