= SS Argonaut =

Cargo ship of the United States

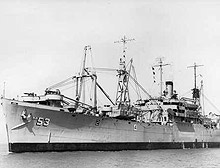
- A Type Andromeda-class cargo ship, a type C2-S-B1 ship

History

United States
- Name: SS Argonaut
- Namesake: Ancient Greek mariner
- Owner: War Shipping Administration
- Operator: Isthmian Steamship Company (1944-1947); American South African Line (1947)
- Fate: Scrapped in 1974

General characteristics
- Class & type: Andromeda-class attack cargo ship
- Displacement: 14,200 tons
- Length: 459 ft 2 in (139.95 m)
- Beam: 63 ft (19 m)
- Draft: 26 ft 4 in (8.03 m)
- Speed: 16.5 knots (30.6 km/h)
- Complement: 429
- Armament: 1 × 5"/38 caliber gun; 8 × 40 mm Bofors guns; 18 × Oerlikon 20 mm cannon

The SS Argonaut was an Andromeda-class cargo ship, a type C2-S-B1 ship, in commission from 1944 to 1947.

== Construction and commissioning ==
The Argonaut was laid down under a Maritime Commission contract as the Maritime Commission type C2-S-B1 hull MC 1182 by the Moore Dry Dock Company at Oakland, California, and was launched on 27 May 1944. She was one of 81 C2-S-B1 type vessels (Breakbulk / Amphibious Attack Transport / Amphibious Attack Cargo / Navy Transport) built by Moore Drydock Company.

=== World War II ===
SS Argonaut was operated by Isthmian Steamship Company under charter with the Maritime Commission and War Shipping Administration from 1944 to 1946. There is not much in the way of records for the Argonaut, but California Crew List records show it left San Francisco, California early in June 1944 on a round trip to Saipan via Pearl Harbor and return by the same route on 3 September 1944. In 1947 she was operated by the American South African Line out of New York City. On 12 June 1947 she was sold to the Farrell Lines and renamed SS African Patriot.

== Disposal ==
On 14 December 1963, she was placed in the James River Reserve Fleet. In 1973 she was scrapped.
