= Italian submarine Argonauta =

Argonauta was the name of at least two ships of the Italian Navy and may refer to:

- Italian submarine Argonauta (1914), ordered by the Imperial Russian Navy and launched in 1914 as Svjatoj Georgij. Seized by Italy in 1915 and renamed Argonauta. She wad discarded in 1928.
- Italian submarine Argonauta (1931), an Argonauta-class submarine launched in 1931 and sunk in 1940.
