= Spanish ship Argonauta =

Several ships of the Spanish Navy have borne the name Argonauta, in honour of the mythological navigators the Argonauts:

- Argonauta (1798), an 80-gun ship, captured in 1805 by the British during the Battle of Trafalgar which later sank as result of damage sustained during a gale.
- Argonauta (1804), a schooner acquired in 1804, captured in 1806 by the British.
- Argonauta, a 74-gun ship, originally the French Argonaute ceded to Spain in 1806, wrecked in 1810 on west coast of Sardinia.
