= Dorcadion sulcipenne =

Scientific classification
- Kingdom: Animalia
- Phylum: Arthropoda
- Clade: Pancrustacea
- Class: Insecta
- Order: Coleoptera
- Suborder: Polyphaga
- Infraorder: Cucujiformia
- Family: Cerambycidae
- Genus: Dorcadion
- Species: D. sulcipenne

Binomial name
- Dorcadion sulcipenne Küster, 1847

Species of beetle

Dorcadion sulcipenne is a species of beetle in the family Cerambycidae. It was described by Küster in 1847. It is known from Turkey, Iran, Armenia, and Turkmenistan.

== Subspecies ==
- Dorcadion sulcipenne argonauta Suvorov, 1913
- Dorcadion sulcipenne caucasicum Küster, 1847
- Dorcadion sulcipenne goektshanum Suvorov, 1915
- Dorcadion sulcipenne impressicorne Tournier, 1872
- Dorcadion sulcipenne sulcipenne Küster, 1847
