= Biscay campaign of June 1795 order of battle =

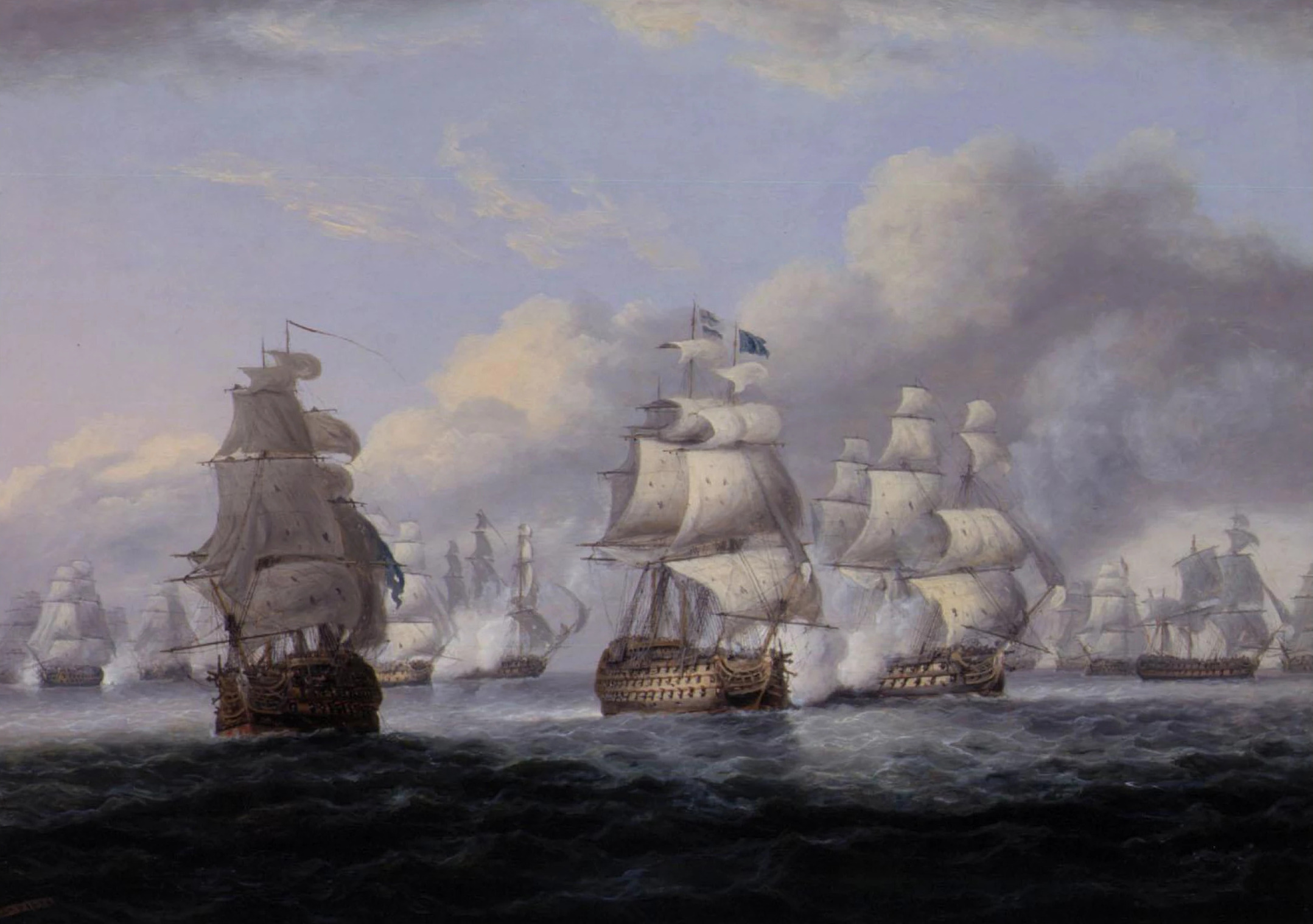
Cornwallis's Retreat, June 17, 1795, Thomas Luny

The Biscay campaign of June 1795 consisted of a series of manoeuvres and two battles fought between the British Channel Fleet and the French Atlantic Fleet off the Southern coast of Brittany in the Bay of Biscay during the French Revolutionary Wars. In late May 1795, a British battle squadron of six ships of the line under Vice-Admiral William Cornwallis was sent by Admiral Lord Bridport to enforce the blockade of the French port of Brest, the home port of the French Atlantic Fleet. On 8 June, Cornwallis discovered a convoy of merchant vessels travelling from Bordeaux to Brest under the protection of a small squadron under Contre-amiral Jean Gaspard Vence. Cornwallis attacked the convoy, Vence retreating under the protection of batteries on the fortified island of Belle Île as Cornwallis seized eight ships from the convoy. As Cornwallis sent his prizes back to Britain the main French fleet at Brest under Vice-amiral Villaret de Joyeuse put to sea to protect Vence's remaining ships.

On 16 June, Cornwallis's squadron encountered Villaret's fleet, in conjunction with Vence's force, off Penmarck Point. Cornwallis had misunderstood the signals from Captain Robert Stopford on the scouting frigate HMS Phaeton and had sailed much too close to the larger French fleet. When he realised his error, the British admiral turned his squadron westwards, retreating away from the French coast with Villaret's force in pursuit. Light winds and poorly loaded ships delayed his escape, and on 17 June the French vanguard caught up with his rearguard. Throughout the day the French and British ships exchanged fire and by the late afternoon the rearmost British ship HMS Mars was in danger of being overwhelmed. Cornwallis responded by interposing his 100-gun flagship HMS Royal Sovereign between the British and French forces. The heavy broadsides of the flagship drove back the French and soon afterwards Villaret recalled his ships, concerned by sails on the horizon which he may have believed to be the rest of the Channel Fleet, although in reality they were a British merchant convoy. The battle is known in British histories as Cornwallis's Retreat.

Villaret retreated towards Brest, but was driven south by a storm on 18 June. Unbeknownst to either Cornwallis or Villaret, the main Channel Fleet was already at sea, protecting an expeditionary force carrying a French Royalist army intended to invade Quiberon, the convoy under the command of Commodore Sir John Borlase Warren. On 22 June, Warren's scouts identified the French fleet at sea off the coastal island of Groix and he took the convoy further out to sea away from the French, who did not pursue, and sent word to Bridport. The British admiral placed his fleet between the French and the expeditionary force, Villaret falling back towards the sheltered anchorage between Groix and the port of Lorient. Light winds delayed both fleets, but on the morning of 23 June Bridport's vanguard overran the rearmost French ships. Villaret attempted to effect a fighting withdrawal, but several of his captains ignored his orders, throwing the retreat into disorder. Three French ships were captured and the rest scattered along the nearby French coast. Although a renewed attack might have destroyed the entire French fleet Bridport, concerned his ships might be wrecked, withdrew unexpectedly. The action is known as the Battle of Groix.

The campaign was a strategic victory for the British; the remainder of the French fleet was forced to shelter in Lorient, from which they were unable to sail again until 1796. The expeditionary force landed safely in Quiberon but the operation ended in disaster, Warren evacuating the survivors a month later. Bridport remained cruising with his fleet off the Breton Coast until September, before handing over control to Rear-Admiral Henry Harvey. The battle was controversial in both countries, British commentators observing that Bridport had missed a unique opportunity to completely destroy the French Atlantic fleet, while in France a series of courts-martial were held to try those officers who were felt to have disobeyed orders: two were dismissed from the French Navy.

== British fleet ==
Note that as carronades were not traditionally taken into consideration when calculating a ship's rate, these ships may have been carrying more guns than indicated below.

=== Cornwallis's Squadron ===
Vice-Admiral Cornwallis's squadron
Ship	Rate	Guns	Commander	Casualties			Notes
Ship	Rate	Guns	Commander	Killed	Wounded	Total	Notes
HMS Royal Sovereign	First rate	100	Vice-Admiral William Cornwallis; Captain John Whitby	0	0	0	Heavily engaged on 17 June.
HMS Mars	Third rate	74	Captain Sir Charles Cotton	0	12	12	Heavily engaged on 17 June, severe damage to rigging and sails.
HMS Triumph	Third rate	74	Captain Sir Erasmus Gower	0	0	0	Engaged on 8 June. Heavily engaged on 17 June: severe damage to rigging, sails and stern.
HMS Brunswick	Third rate	74	Captain Lord Charles FitzGerald	0	0	0	Engaged on 17 June.
HMS Bellerophon	Third rate	74	Captain Lord Cranstoun	0	0	0	Engaged on 17 June.
HMS Phaeton	Fifth rate	38	Captain Robert Stopford	-	-	-	Lightly damaged, 1 killed, 7 wounded on 8 June. Present but not engaged on 17 June.
HMS Pallas	Fifth rate	32	Captain Henry Curzon	-	-	-	Present but not engaged on 17 June.
HMS Kingfisher	Brig-sloop	18	Commander Thomas Le Marchant Gosselin	-	-	-	Retired to Spithead on 11 June.
Total casualties: 12 wounded
Sources: James, pp. 237–240; Clowes, pp. 255–258; "No. 13790", The London Gazette, 23 June 1795, pp. 655–656

=== Bridport's fleet ===
Admiral Lord Bridport's Fleet
Ship	Rate	Guns	Commander	Casualties			Notes
Ship	Rate	Guns	Commander	Killed	Wounded	Total	Notes
HMS Royal George	First rate	100	Admiral Lord Bridport; Captain William Domett	0	7	7	Engaged on 23 June.
HMS Queen Charlotte	First rate	100	Captain Sir Andrew Snape Douglas	4	32	36	Heavily engaged on 23 June and damaged in rigging and sails.
HMS Queen	Second rate	98	Vice-Admiral Sir Alan Gardner; Captain William Bedford	0	0	0	Engaged on 23 June.
HMS London	Second rate	98	Vice-Admiral John Colpoys; Captain Edward Griffith	0	3	3	Engaged on 23 June.
HMS Prince of Wales	Second rate	98	Vice-Admiral Henry Harvey; Captain John Bazely	-	-	-	Not engaged in the action.
HMS Prince	Second rate	98	Captain Charles Powell Hamilton	-	-	-	Not engaged in the action.
HMS Prince George	Second rate	98	Captain William Edge	-	-	-	Not engaged in the action.
HMS Barfleur	Second rate	98	Captain James Richard Dacres	-	-	-	Not engaged in the action.
HMS Sans Pareil	Third rate	80	Rear-Admiral Lord Hugh Seymour; Captain William Browell	10	2	12	Heavily engaged on 23 June and lightly damaged.
HMS Valiant	Third rate	74	Captain Christopher Parker	-	-	-	Not engaged in the action.
HMS Orion	Third rate	74	Captain Sir James Saumarez	6	18	24	Heavily engaged on 23 June.
HMS Irresistible	Third rate	74	Captain Richard Grindall	3	11	14	Heavily engaged on 23 June and lightly damaged.
HMS Russell	Third rate	74	Captain Thomas Larcom	3	10	13	Heavily engaged on 23 June.
HMS Colossus	Third rate	74	Captain John Monkton	5	30	35	Heavily engaged on 23 June.
Support ships
HMS Revolutionnaire	Fifth rate	38	Captain Francis Cole	-	-	-	Not engaged in the action.
HMS Thalia	Fifth rate	36	Captain Lord Henry Paulet	-	-	-	Not engaged in the action.
HMS Nymphe	Fifth rate	36	Captain George Murray	-	-	-	Not engaged in the action.
HMS Aquilon	Fifth rate	32	Captain Robert Barlow	-	-	-	Not engaged in the action.
HMS Astrea	Fifth rate	32	Captain Richard Lane	-	-	-	Not engaged in the action.
HMS Babet	Sixth rate	20	Captain Edward Codrington	-	-	-	Not engaged in the action.
HMS Charon	Hospital Ship		Commander Walter Lock	-	-	-	Not engaged in the action.
HMS Maegera	Fireship	14	Commander Henry Blackwood	-	-	-	Not engaged in the action.
HMS Incendiary	Fireship	14	Commander John Draper	-	-	-	Not engaged in the action.
HMS Argus	Lugger	14		-	-	-	Not engaged in the action.
HMS Dolly	Lugger	14		-	-	-	Not engaged in the action.
Total casualties: 31 killed, 113 wounded
Sources: James, pp. 240–250; Clowes, pp. 260–263; "No. 13790", The London Gazette, 27 June 1795, pp. 673–674

=== Quiberon Expeditionary Force ===
Commodore Warren's squadron
Ship	Rate	Guns	Commander	Casualties			Notes
Ship	Rate	Guns	Commander	Killed	Wounded	Total	Notes
HMS Robust	Third rate	74	Captain Edward Thornbrough	-	-	-	Attached to Bridport's fleet on 20 June but not engaged in the action.
HMS Thunderer	Third rate	74	Captain Albemarle Bertie	-	-	-	Attached to Bridport's fleet on 20 June but not engaged in the action.
HMS Standard	Third rate	64	Captain Joseph Ellison	-	-	-	Attached to Bridport's fleet on 20 June but not engaged in the action.
HMS Pomone	Fifth rate	44	Commodore Sir John Borlase Warren	-	-	-	
HMS Anson	Fifth rate	44	Captain Philip Charles Durham	-	-	-	
HMS Artois	Fifth rate	38	Captain Sir Edmund Nagle	-	-	-	
HMS Arethusa	Fifth rate	38	Captain Mark Robinson	-	-	-	
HMS Concorde	Fifth rate	32	Captain Anthony Hunt	-	-	-	
HMS Galatea	Fifth rate	32	Captain Richard Goodwin Keats	-	-	-	
Sources: James, p. 253; Clowes, p. 265

== French fleet ==
Officers killed in action are marked with a † symbol. Note that as carronades were not traditionally taken into consideration when calculating a ship's rate, these ships may have been carrying more guns than indicated below.

- Ships in this colour were captured during the Battle of Groix, 23 June 1795

Villaret de Joyeuse's fleet
Ship	Type	Guns	Commander	Casualties			Notes
Ship	Type	Guns	Commander	Killed	Wounded	Total	Notes
Peuple	Ship of the line	120	Vice-admiral Louis Thomas Villaret de Joyeuse; Captain Étienne Eustache Bruix; Captain Jacques Angot † Représentant Jean-Nicolas Topsent	Unknown			Heavily engaged on 23 June.
Redoutable	Ship of the line	74	Counter-admiral Yves-Joseph de Kerguelen-Trémarec; Captain Pierre-Augustin Moncousu	-			Not engaged in the action.
Alexandre	Ship of the line	74	Captain François Charles Guillemet	220			Heavily engaged, badly damaged and captured, later became HMS Alexander.
Droits de l’Homme	Ship of the line	74	Captain Pierre-François Cornic Dumoulin	Unknown			Engaged on 17 June. Not engaged on 23 June.
Formidable	Ship of the line	74	Captain Charles-Alexandre Léon Durand Linois	320			Engaged on 17 June. Heavily engaged on 23 June, badly damaged and captured, later became HMS Belleisle.
Fougueux	Ship of the line	74	Captain Giot-Labrière	-			Not engaged on 17 or 23 June. Captain later court-martialled and dismissed for disobeying orders.
Jean Bart	Ship of the line	74	Captain Louis-Marie Le Gouardun	-			Not engaged on 17 or 23 June.
Mucius	Ship of the line	74	Captain Larréguy	Unknown			Engaged on 23 June. Captain later court-martialled and censured for disobeying orders.
Nestor	Ship of the line	74	Counter-admiral Jean Gaspard de Vence; Captain Henry	Unknown			Engaged on 23 June.
Tigre	Ship of the line	74	Captain Jacques Bedout	130			Engaged on 17 and 23 June.
Wattignies	Ship of the line	74	Captain Joseph René Donat	Unknown			Engaged on 23 June.
Zélé	Ship of the line	74	Captain Jean-Charles-François Aved-Magnac	0	5	5	Heavily engaged on 17 June. Not engaged on 23 June. Captain later court-martialled and dismissed for disobeying orders.
Support ships
Brave	Frigate	42	Captain Antoine René Thévenard	-			Not engaged in the action.
Scévola	Frigate	42	Captain Le Bozec	-			Not engaged in the action.
Cocarde nationale	Frigate	40	Captain Pierre Maurice Julien de Quérangal	-			Not engaged in the action.
Driade	Frigate	36	Lieutenant Gramont	-			Not engaged in the action.
Fidèle	Frigate	38	Lieutenant Bernard	-			Not engaged in the action.
Fraternité	Frigate	36	Lieutenant Florinville	-			Not engaged in the action.
Insurgente	Frigate	32	Lieutenant Violette	-			Not engaged in the action.
Néréide	Frigate	36	Lieutenant Briand	-			Not engaged in the action.
Proserpine	Frigate	38	Captain Daugier	-			Not engaged in the action.
Régénérée	Frigate	40	Captain Héron	None			Lightly engaged on 23 June.
Républicaine française	Frigate	40	Lieutenant François Pitot	-			Not engaged in the action.
Tribune	Frigate	40	Lieutenant Bernard	-			Not engaged in the action.
Vengeance	Frigate	40	Lieutenant Leconte	-			Not engaged in the action.
Virginie	Frigate	40	Lieutenant Jacques Bergeret	Unknown			Heavily engaged on 17 June.
Atalante	Corvette	16	Ensign Dordelin	-			Not engaged in the action.
Constance	Corvette	22	Lieutenant Bouchet	-			Not engaged in the action.
Las Casas	Corvette	18	Lieutenant Blanzon	-			Not engaged in the action.
Abeille	Corvette	14	Ensign Denis	-			Not engaged in the action.
Papillon	Brig	14	Lieutenant Cousin	-			Not engaged in the action.
Lark	Corvette	10	Ensign Le Large	-			Not engaged in the action.
Printemps	Cutter	10	Ensign Le Faucheur	-			Not engaged in the action.
Sources: James, pp. 237–253; Clowes, pp. 255–264; Rouvier, pp. 213–214

== Notes ==
1. Note A: In his 1868 account of the battle, Charles Rouvier gives casualties on Tigre as 150 killed and 300 wounded, although other sources give total casualties as 130.

== Bibliography ==
- Brenton, Edward Pelham (1837) [1825]. The Naval History of Great Britain, Vol. I. London: C. Rice.
- Clowes, William Laird (1997) [1900]. The Royal Navy, A History from the Earliest Times to 1900, Volume IV. London: Chatham Publishing. ISBN 1-86176-013-2.
- Gardiner, Robert, ed. (2001) [1996]. Fleet Battle and Blockade. Caxton Editions. ISBN 1-84067-363-X.
- James, William (2002) [1827]. The Naval History of Great Britain, Volume 1, 1793–1796. London: Conway Maritime Press. ISBN 0-85177-905-0.
- Rouvier, Charles (1868). "Crosière dans l'océan". Histoire des marins français sous la République, de 1789 à 1803 (in French). Paris: Librairie Maritime at Scientifique.
- Tracy, Nicholas (editor) (1998). "Cornwallis's Retreat". The Naval Chronicle, Volume 1, 1793–1798. Chatham Publishing. ISBN 1-86176-091-4.
- Woodman, Richard (2001). The Sea Warriors. Constable Publishers. ISBN 1-84119-183-3.
