= HMS Brunswick (1790) =

Ship of the line of the Royal Navy

- Brunswick (centre) at the Glorious First of June

History

Great Britain
- Name: Brunswick
- Ordered: 7 January 1785
- Builder: Deptford Dockyard
- Laid down: May 1786
- Launched: 30 April 1790
- Fate: Broken up, 1826
- Notes: Participated in: Glorious First of June; Cornwallis's Retreat; Battle of Copenhagen (1807)

General characteristics
- Class & type: 74-gun third rate ship of the line
- Tons burthen: 1836 13/94 (bm)
- Length: 176 ft 2 1/2 in (53.7 m) (gundeck)
- Beam: 48 ft 9 in (14.9 m)
- Depth of hold: 19 ft 6 in (5.9 m)
- Propulsion: Sails
- Sail plan: Full-rigged ship
- Armament: Gundeck: 28 × 32-pdrs; Upper gundeck: 28 × 18-pdrs; Quarterdeck: 14 × 9-pdrs; Forecastle: 4 × 9-pdrs

HMS Brunswick was a 74-gun third rate ship-of-the-line of the Royal Navy, launched on 30 April 1790 at Deptford. She was first commissioned in the following month under Sir Hyde Parker for the Spanish Armament but was not called into action. When the Russian Armament was resolved without conflict in August 1791, Brunswick took up service as a guardship in Portsmouth Harbour. She joined Richard Howe's Channel Fleet at the outbreak of the French Revolutionary War and was present at the battle on Glorious First of June where she fought a hard action against the French 74-gun Vengeur du Peuple. Brunswick was in a small squadron under William Cornwallis that encountered a large French fleet in June 1795. The British ships successfully retreated into the Atlantic through a combination of good seamanship, good fortune and deceiving the enemy.

After a five-year spell in the West Indies, Brunswick returned home and was refitted at Portsmouth. In 1807, when Denmark was under threat from a French invasion, Brunswick was part of a task force, under overall command of James Gambier, sent to demand the surrender of the Danish fleet. When the Danes refused to comply, Brunswick joined in with an attack on the capital, Copenhagen. She returned to the Baltic some months later, following the Treaty of Tilsit and, while attached to Richard Goodwin Keats' squadron, she helped with the evacuation of 10,000 Spanish troops from the region. From 1812 Brunswick was on harbour service, and in 1826 she was broken up.

== Construction and armament ==
Brunswick was a 74-gun, third-rate ship-of-the-line ordered on 7 January 1785. She was the first of her type built following the American Revolutionary war and was significantly larger than previous 74s. The Admiralty approved the design on 10 January 1785 and work began in May 1786 when her keel, of 145 feet 2 inches (44.2 m) was laid down at Deptford. When finished, she was 176 feet 0 inches (53.6 m) along the gun deck, had a beam of 48 feet 8 inches (14.8 m) and a depth in the hold of 19 feet 6 inches (5.9 m). She was 1,82872/94 tons burthen and drew between 13 ft 0 in (3.96 m) and 16 ft 7 in (5.05 m).

The ship was initially designed to carry a main battery of twenty-eight 32-pounder (15 kg) guns on the lower deck and thirty 18-pounder (8.2 kg) on the upper deck, with a secondary armament of twelve 9-pounder (4.1 kg) guns on the quarterdeck and four on the forecastle. She was launched on 30 April 1790 and taken down the Thames to Woolwich where she was fitted-out between 17 May and 18 June. Her build and first fitting cost the Admiralty £47,781.0.0d.

In December 1806, Brunswick's armament was changed so that all her guns fired a 24-pounder (11 kg) shot. This meant that the guns on the lower deck were downgraded while those on the upperdeck were upgraded. The guns on the forecastle were replaced with two 24-pounder long guns and four 24-pounder carronades, and on the quarterdeck, the twelve 9-pounders were removed to make way for two long guns and ten carronades, all 24-pounders. The great guns on the upper decks were mounted on Gover carriages which enabled them to be handled by fewer men.

== Career ==
Brunswick's first captain, Sir Hyde Parker, was appointed in May 1790 during the Spanish Armament. At the end of that year he was superseded by Sir Roger Curtis, under whom Brunswick spent most of 1791 at Spithead until the settlement of the Russian Armament, without hostility, in late August. She then paid off, but was immediately recommissioned to serve as a guardship in Portsmouth Harbour, and continued in that role through 1792, except for a brief period spent in the "Evolution Squadron". On 29 October 1792, three condemned mutineers of the Mutiny on the Bounty were hanged from her yardarms.

Following the outbreak of the French Revolutionary War, Captain John Harvey took command of Brunswick, and saw service in the Channel Fleet under the overall command of Admiral Earl Howe. As part of this fleet, on 2 May 1794, she accompanied the East and West India and Newfoundland convoys along the Channel as far as Lizard Point. Howe then divided his force, sending eight ships-of-the-line and four or five frigates to escort the convoys further while the remaining 26 ships-of-the-line, including Brunswick, set off to search for a large Franco-American grain convoy known to be heading for France.

Howe realised that the French fleet at Brest would be detailed to escort the grain convoy through hostile waters. Having had two frigates confirm that the French fleet was still in port, Howe attempted to intercept the convoy in advance by placing his ships where he thought an encounter most likely. After thirteen days of searching however, the British fleet returned on 19 May, to find the fleet in Brest gone. It had in fact passed close by the British ships, in thick fog, two days previously on 17 May. On the evening of 19 May, Howe's fleet fell in with the fifth-rate HMS Venus, which had been attached to Rear-Admiral Sir George Montagu's squadron. Also searching for the convoy, Montagu had been cruising between Cape Ortugal and Belle-Isle, but knowing he would be hopelessly outnumbered, he had sent Venus to locate Howe and ask for reinforcements. At 04:00 the next morning, Howe ordered all sail in an attempt to reach Montagu before the French. However, part of a Dutch convoy, which had been captured by the French on 19 May, was recaptured by the Howe's fleet on 21 May, and the former prisoners were able to provide information regarding the whereabouts of the French fleet. In light of this new information, Howe realised that Montagu was no longer in danger and altered course to pursue the French.

=== First of June ===
The British and French fleets on the morning of 1 June 1794

On 25 May a French ship was seen and followed, which after three days led the British to the main French fleet. Howe gave the order to prepare for battle at 09:45 on 28 May and at 10:35 to form into two columns. In an attempt to force an action, some of the fastest ships were sent to attack the French rear, which they did throughout the day, both causing and receiving some damage. The two fleets came together on 29 May, and a limited engagement took place that petered out and became a general chase after an attempt to cut the French line was mistimed. Thick fog prevented any further action for the next two days.

The weather cleared on the morning of 1 June, and both fleets were drawn up line ahead, sailing in the same direction, Brunswick in the centre, immediately behind Hood's flagship, the first-rate Queen Charlotte and in front of Valiant. At around 08:15 the order was given for each ship to bear down upon and engage her opposite number. Brunswick was one of three ships Howe signalled to put on more sail. The tardiness of Brunswick and the 74-gun Gibraltar, on the other side of Queen Charlotte, meant that Howe found himself battling one 120-gun and two 80-gun ships simultaneously.

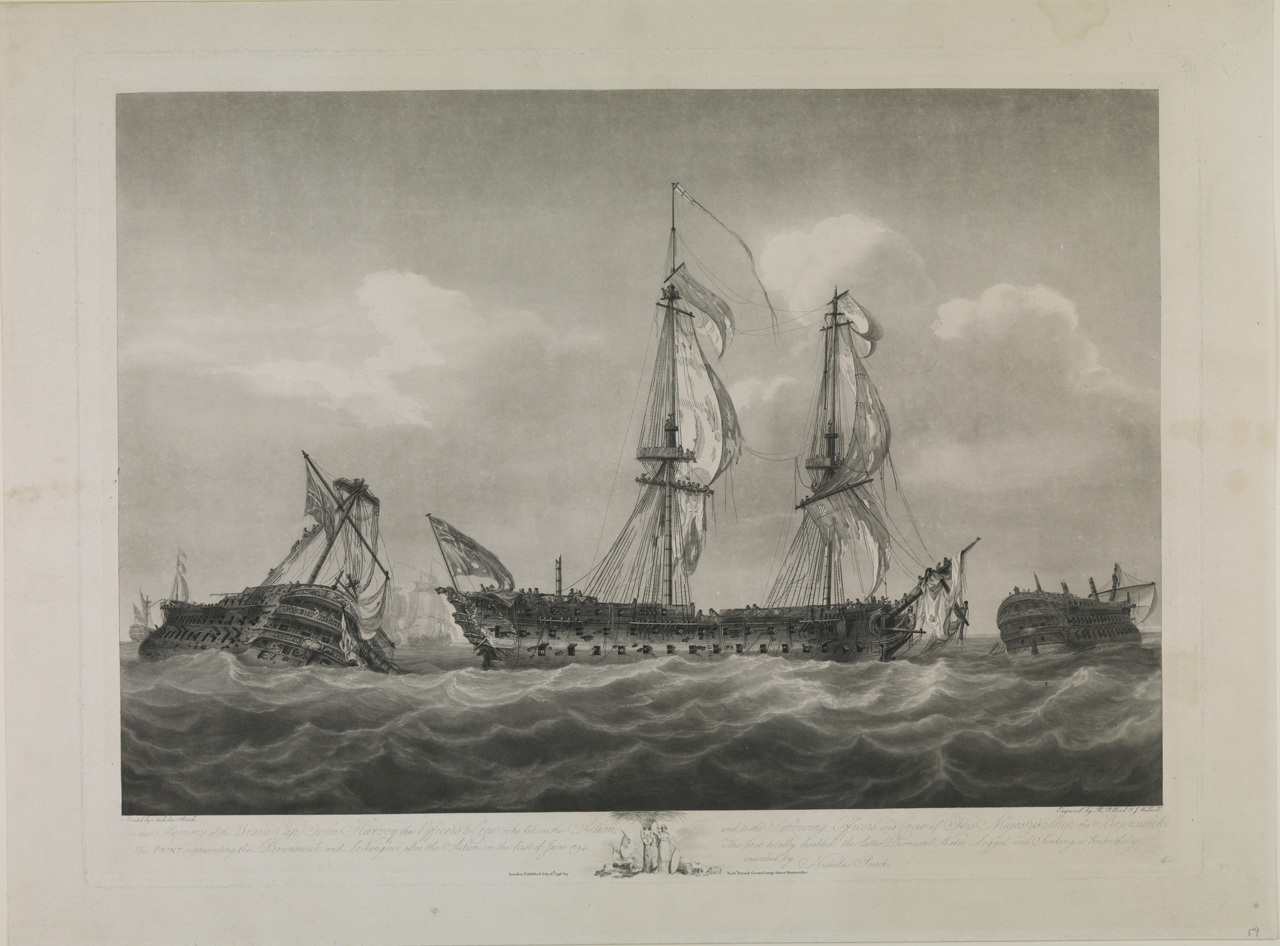
Brunswick (centre), following her engagement with Vengeur du Peuple (left) and Achille (right), on 1 June 1794

Gibraltar was, however, able to stop a fourth enemy ship, the first-rate Républicain, from joining in, by bringing down her main and mizzen masts from a distance, while Brunswick, having made all sail as directed, was close enough to draw the fire of the Vengeur du Peuple. Unable to pass astern, Harvey had his ship come hard alongside and the two became locked together; the Brunswick's anchors fouling on Vengeur's fore-shrouds and channels. When asked whether they should attempt to cut Brunswick free, Harvey replied, "No, we have got her and we will keep her". The British, prevented from opening their lower gun ports by the pressure exerted by the hull of Vengeur du Peuple, simply shot through them and the two ships drifted out of the line as they exchanged broadsides.

A while later, at 11:00, a second French ship, Achille, attempted to join the action but Brunswick shot away her only remaining mast, which fell over the side and obstructed her guns. Unable to return fire or manoeuvre, she was forced to strike. When it became apparent that she could not be taken possession of, Achille spread her spritsail, rehoisted her colours and tried to make her escape. Henry Harvey in HMS Ramillies then sailed to his brother's aid; raking Vengeur du Peuple twice and forcing the two ships apart, before turning to secure Achille.

By the end of the action, Vengeur had sunk from the damage inflicted by Brunswick and six other French ships had been captured. The remainder escaped. In the three engagements, it was estimated that French casualties were between 3,000 and 7,000 dead and wounded, while British losses were recorded as 290 dead and 858 wounded. Brunswick had been badly damaged; she had lost her mizzen mast completely, her yards were shattered and her sails and rigging had been shot away, 23 guns had been dismounted, she had been on fire three times and her starboard quarter gallery was missing. She drifted away to leeward of the retreating enemy fleet, but made all available sail to head northward for the safety of a home port. Having had 45 killed and 114 wounded, including Captain Harvey who died of the wounds later, Brunswick had suffered the highest casualty toll of any Royal Navy ship present at the battle. After Harvey had been carried below, Lieutenant William Edward Cracraft was made acting captain. Despite his own ship's condition, when the dismasted French ship Jemmapes was encountered, at 15:00, Cracraft had Brunswick hove to with the intention of engaging. Jemmapes however indicated that she had already struck.

=== Operations off Belle Ile ===
In 1795, Brunswick, under Captain Lord Charles Fitzgerald, was attached to William Cornwallis's squadron in the Channel. On the morning of 8 June, Cornwallis' force comprising five ships-of-the-line, two frigates and a small brig-sloop, was cruising southwards along the Breton coast and past the Penmarck Rocks, when at 10:30, HMS Triumph signalled the presence of six sails to the north-east. Cornwallis turned his squadron to investigate and discovered the ships were part of a large merchant convoy, escorted by three ships-of-the-line and six or seven frigates under the overall command of Contre-Amiral Jean Gaspard Vence. At first, the convoy sailed towards Cornwallis's squadron, believing it to be French. When the mistake was realised, at 12:00, Vence ordered his ships towards Belle Île, where they could shelter beneath the gun batteries. Cornwallis sent his fastest ships ahead, to engage the trailing ships of the convoy and try to force an action but, despite taking eight prizes, they were not able to do so.

Prevented from pressing their attack by the shoal waters and batteries, the British anchored in the Palais Road, close to the island, where they remained until the following evening. On 9 June, they sailed into the Bay of Biscay and around Ushant headland, reaching the Scilly Isles on 11 June. The eight brigs taken off Belle Ile and two American vessels captured after, were at that point, sent into Spithead under escort off the 18-gun HMS Kingfisher. The remaining ships turned back towards Belle Île, in the hope that by then, Vence's squadron would be in open water.

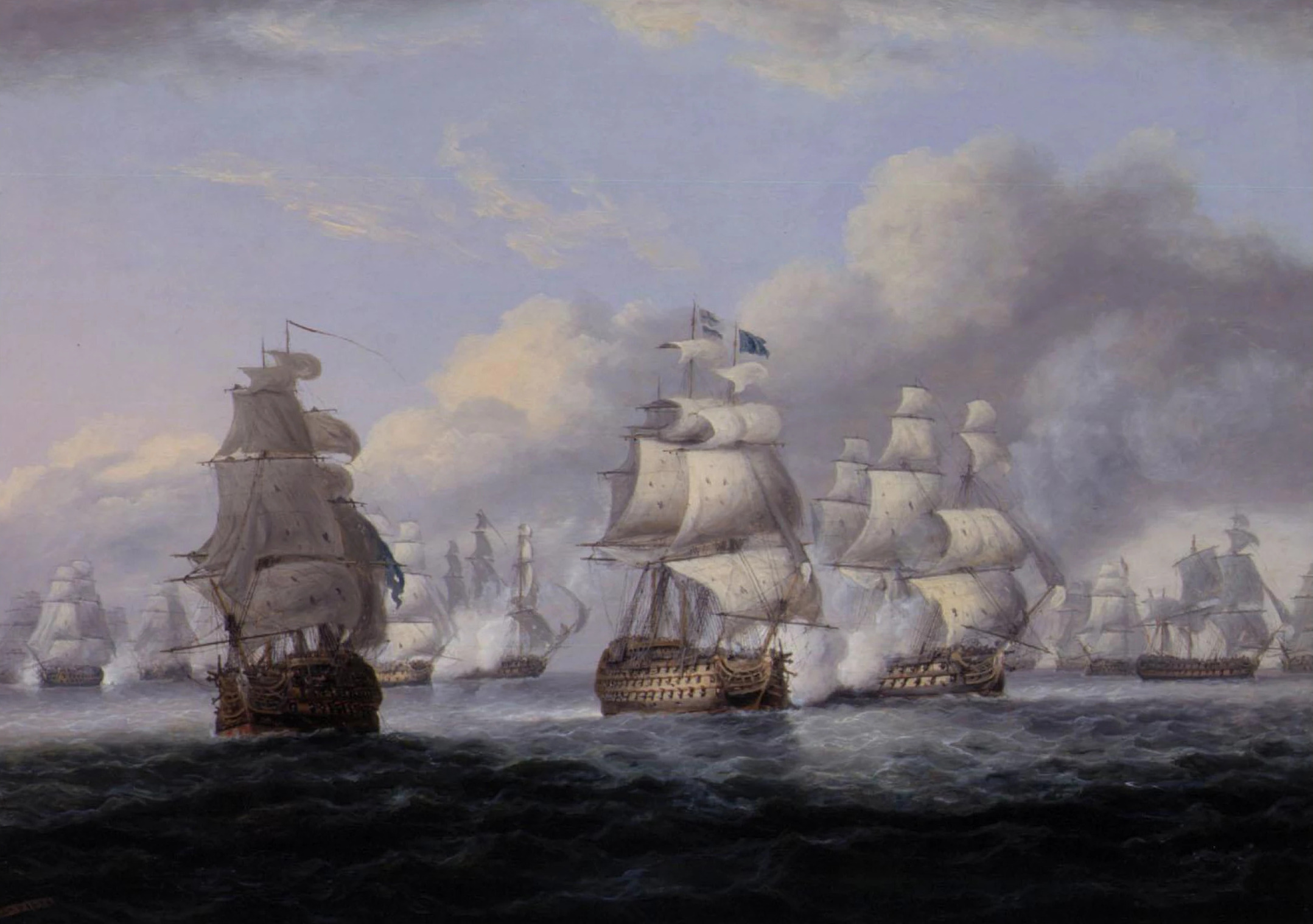
Cornwallis's Retreat, June 17, 1795, Thomas Luny

On 15 June, Vence's squadron was sailing off the island of Groix, when it encountered a French fleet under Villaret de Joyeuse, which had sailed from Brest on 12 June and comprised nine ships-of-the-line, nine frigates (including two ships of the line razeed into 50-gun frigates) and four corvettes. The two forces joined and turned north. On 16 June, the French fleet was off Penmarck Point when, at 10:30, Cornwallis's squadron was spotted to the north-west. Cornwallis was anticipating Vence's merchant convoy which had arrived at its destination some days previous, and did not immediately understand the danger his squadron was in. HMS Phaeton, having been sent ahead to investigate, added to the confusion when she signalled to Cornwallis that the French fleet contained 30 vessels, but did not return. This caused Cornwallis to take the signal to mean that the French ships, while more numerous, were inferior in strength.

At 11:00, seeing that Cornwallis was still advancing, Phaeton signalled the exact composition of Villaret's fleet. The British squadron, now realising the danger, turned away to the south-west, with Brunswick leading the line and the French in pursuit. Having followed the British out into the Atlantic, at 14:00, Villaret's fleet divided with one part sailing north to cut Cornwallis off, while the other maintained its course to the south. By 18:00 the northern squadron had overhauled the British who found themselves directly between the two French divisions, no more than 9 nautical miles (17 km) from each.

The chase continued into the night with Brunswick and HMS Bellerophon struggling to keep station. In an effort to increase their speed, the two ships jettisoned their anchors, boats and much of their provisions. Bellerophon was sailing so slowly that her captain, James Cranstoun, ordered four carronades and a large amount of roundshot to be thrown over the side. At 09:00, Zélé, the leading French ship in the windward squadron was close enough to open to fire on the British rearguard ship, HMS Mars. The action was soon joined by the 40-gun frigate Virginie which came up on Mars' port quarter. Concerned that Bellerophon, which was close by, might lose a sail, a loss she could not sustain, Cornwallis ordered Triumph and Royal Sovereign to drop back and allow Bellerophon to join Brunswick at the front. This reorganisation of the line slowed the entire squadron and put all the ships in range of the French vanguard. The British cut holes in the stern planks of their ships to allow more cannon to be trained on Villaret's advancing fleet. This tactic appeared to be successful, and at 13:30, the leading French ship was forced to fall back when she lost her main topgallant mast.

The French continued their attack on the British rear and, after a further four hours, Mars began to fall away to leeward. Seeing this, Royal Sovereign and Triumph yawed, raking the four French ships heading to cut her off and take possession of her. This action caused the French ships to haul to wind and Mars was able to rejoin her squadron. A more distant engagement then took place which petered out just after 18:30 when the French broke off the attack and turned away to the east. Phaeton, some miles ahead, had spent all day signalling to an imaginary fleet over the horizon. By coincidence at 18:00 four small sail appeared in the distance which, coupled with Phaeton's ruse de guerre was enough to convince Villaret that the British fleet was arriving.

=== Service in the West Indies ===
Later in June 1795, William Browell became Brunswick's captain and she served as the flagship of Rear-Admiral Richard Rodney Bligh. She sailed to the Windward Islands the following year, carrying Bligh who had been appointed second in command there. She arrived at Martinique in September but then immediately left for Jamaica; Bligh having received orders to take command of that station until the arrival of Hyde Parker.

In 1797, Brunswick was in the Leeward Islands under captain William Gordon Rutherford. While cruising with her squadron, between 26 June and 21 July 1797, Brunswick captured a Spanish schooner on its way from St Domingo to Jamaica and detained a vessel under Danish colours which was travelling between St Thomas and New Orleans. In the following three months, she took a second Spanish schooner, out of La Guaira, a Danish schooner bound for Charleston and a Danish brig on its way to St Thomas. American and Spanish brigs were taken between the end of 1799 and the following February. Another Spanish schooner was apprehended between February and May 1800.

In September Brunswick returned to England and paid off. She was refitted at Portsmouth between February and April the following year.

=== Attack on Copenhagen ===
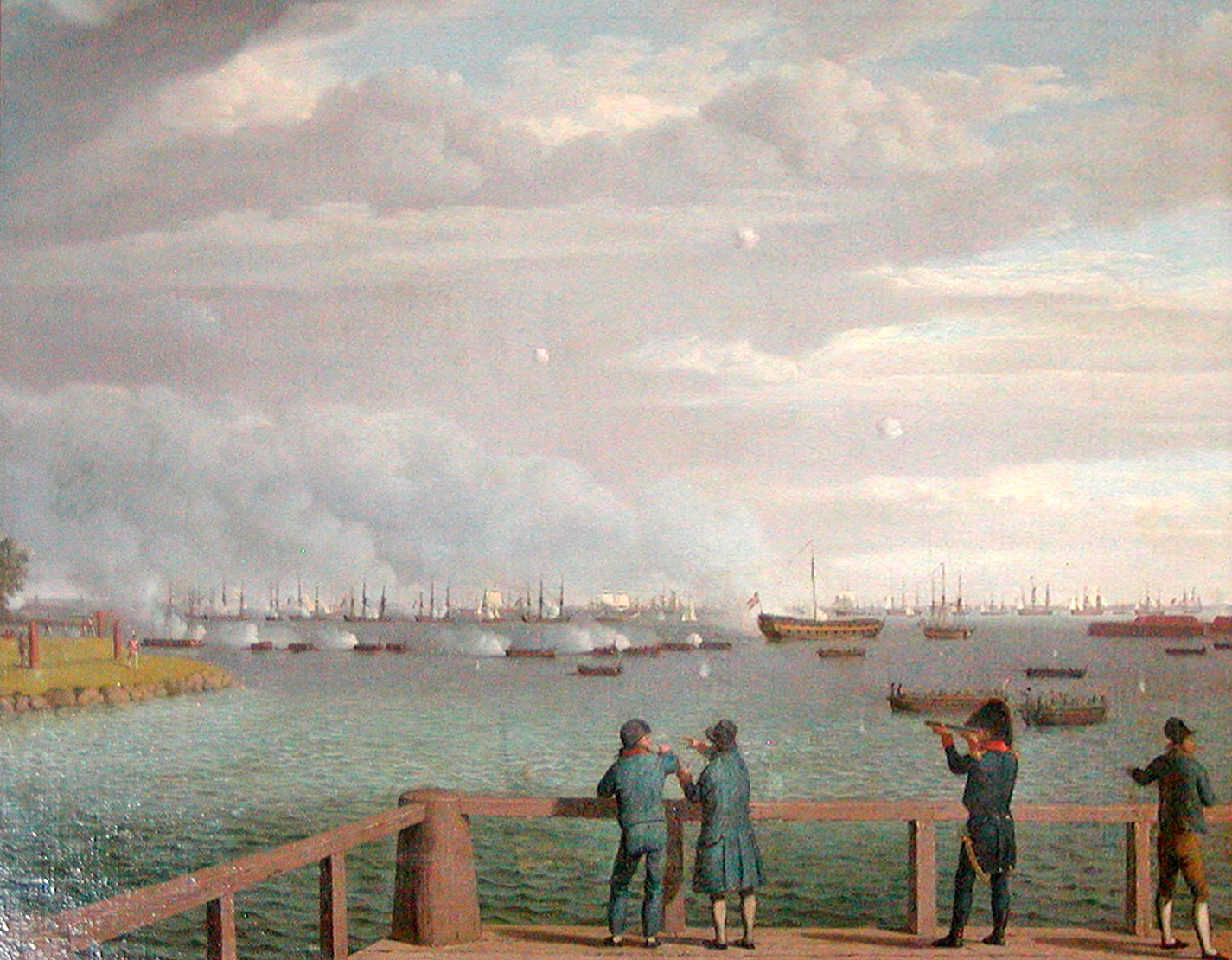
The 1807 bombardment of Copenhagen by Christoffer Wilhelm Eckersberg

In 1807, with Denmark under threat from Napoleon's forces, Brunswick took part in an expedition to prevent the Danish fleet falling into French hands. Following the defeat of Prussia in December 1806, Denmark's continuing independence looked increasingly fragile. It was feared that Denmark, under pressure from France, might deny Britain access to the Baltic Sea, something the British believed vital for trade as well as being a major source of the raw materials required for building and maintaining their warships. Brunswick was one of 17 ships-of-the-line, together with 21 smaller vessels, sent to demand the surrender of the Danish fleet. Under overall command of James Gambier, the British fleet left Great Yarmouth on 26 July. On arrival off Gothenburg, on 1 August, Gambier despatched four ships-of-the-line and two frigates to guard the Great Belt and stop reinforcements being brought in from Holstein, where a Danish army of 24,000 was camped. Brunswick remained with the main force. Over the next twelve days more ships arrived, swelling the British force to 25 ships-of-the-line, 40 smaller warships, and 377 transports carrying 27,000 troops.

On 10 August, having refused initial demands by the British, the Danes made further preparations to defend their city – already heavily fortified with 174 guns of 24 and 36lb, and 25 of the largest calibre mortars available. Additionally, and separate from the fleet moored in the harbour, a 64-gun blockship guarded the entrance with four 20-gun prames, two floating batteries and 25–30 gunboats. There were 5,500 troops stationed in Copenhagen and around 3,000 sailors. A contingent of 3,500 armed civilians also remained but the rest of the population was evacuated, while negotiations with the British continued.

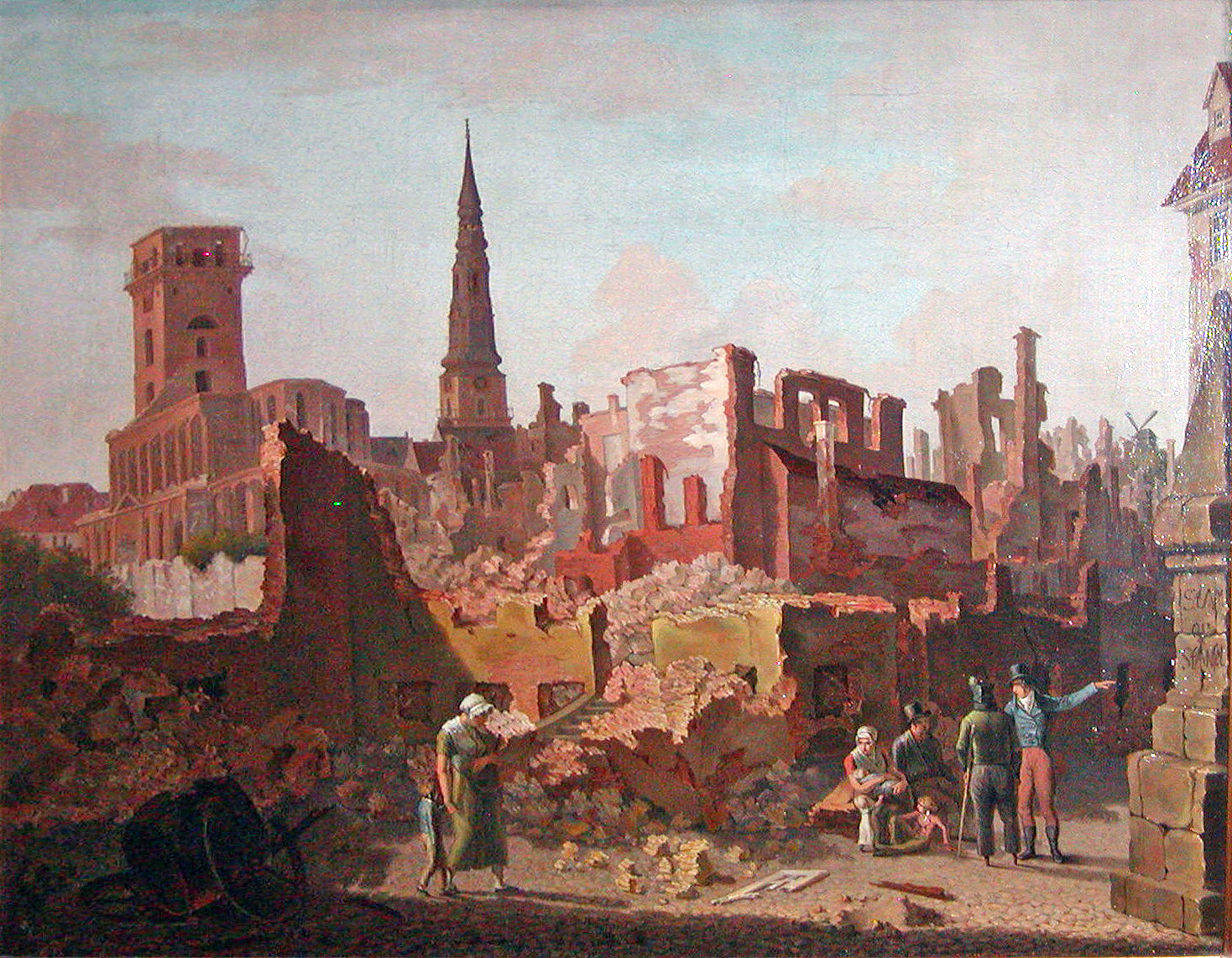
Copenhagen after the bombardment painted by J. D. Moller

Although no formal state of war existed at the time, on 13 August, a seventy-four and a sloop of war from Gambier's fleet pursued and, eventually, engaged and captured the Danish frigate, Frederickscoarn. On 16 August the King of Denmark ordered that all British vessels should be seized and detained; and on 17 August, Danish gunboats left the harbour and set fire to an English merchant barque. The British landed a contingent of troops 12 miles north of the city on 16 August, the fleet returning to Copenhagen later the following day, where Gambier issued a retaliatory proclamation that all Danish vessels were to be detained. Brunswick was soon in accord through the capture of two enemy craft. Further skirmishes occurred between 18 and 21 August while the British landed their remaining troops, invested the island with their ships and instituted a close blockade. As the troops moved to lay siege to the city and construct batteries, they received heavy fire from Danish gunboats, which in turn were harassed by the smaller ships from the British fleet.

By 1 September, the French had arrived at Strasland and Gambier was obliged to send more of his ships to blockade the port and prevent the passage of reinforcements to Zealand. Having now completed batteries for 48 mortars and howitzers plus twenty 24lb long guns, the commander of the British army, William Cathcart, and Gambier made a final appeal to the Danes, this time offering to return the ships at the end of hostilities. An agreement could not be reached, however, and the following day the British opened fire on the city. The bombardment continued, on and off, until 5 September, during which time much of the city had been destroyed. The terms of the capitulation were ratified on 7 September and the British occupied the city while the ships of the Danish fleet were either removed or destroyed. Of the prizes taken, 18 were ships-of-the-line, 10 were frigates and 14 were sloops-of-war, including Little Belt. In addition, 25 gunboats were confiscated.

=== Return to the Baltic ===
Following the Treaty of Tilsit, Russia became an enemy of the United Kingdom and Sweden, and in May 1808, Brunswick was sent back to the Baltic; part of a fleet, under James Saumarez. While attached to Richard Goodwin Keats' squadron in August, Brunswick assisted in the evacuation of 10,000 Spanish troops from the region. Initially fighting for Napoleon in Northern Germany and Denmark, the Spaniards had changed allegiance following the occupation of their country by the French. Keats in HMS Superb, accompanied by Brunswick, HMS Edgar and five or six smaller vessels were in close proximity at the time and were contacted by the Spanish commander-in-chief, the Marquis de la Romana, with a view to joining forces. On 9 August a plan was formulated for the Spaniards to seize the fort and town of Nyborg, allowing Keats' squadron to take possession of the port and organise the evacuation. The Danes were informed that, providing they did not interfere with the operation, the town would be spared. All were in agreement except for the captains of a 16-gun brig and a 12-gun cutter, who positioned their vessels across the harbour entrance. These were captured by British sailors in a cutting-out expedition and taken into service as HMS Fama and HMS Salorman. Prevented from taken his squadron into the harbour by contrary winds, Keats had 57 local boats loaded with the Spaniards' stores and artillery and taken to Slipshavn, four miles to the south-east, where, on 11 August, the troops were able to embark.

== Fate ==
In 1812 Brunswick was on harbour service, and she was broken up in 1826.
