= French ship Dalmate (1808) =

Ship of the line of the French Navy

- Scale model of Achille, sister ship of French ship Dalmate (1808), on display at the Musée national de la Marine in Paris.

History

France
- Name: Dalmate
- Namesake: Dalmatia
- Builder: Antwerp
- Laid down: 22 August 1806
- Launched: 21 August 1808
- Decommissioned: 1819
- Fate: Broken up, 1820

General characteristics
- Class & type: petit Téméraire-class ship of the line
- Displacement: 2,781 tonneaux
- Tons burthen: 1,381 port tonneaux
- Length: 53.97 m (177 ft 1 in)
- Beam: 14.29 m (46 ft 11 in)
- Draught: 6.72 m (22.0 ft)
- Depth of hold: 6.9 m (22 ft 8 in)
- Sail plan: Full-rigged ship
- Crew: 705
- Armament: 74 guns: Lower gun deck: 28 × 36 pdr guns; Upper gun deck: 30 × 18 pdr guns; Forecastle and Quarterdeck: 20–26 × 8 pdr guns & 36 pdr carronades

Dalmate was a 74-gun petite Téméraire-class ship of the line built for the French Navy during the first decade of the 19th century. Completed in 1809, she had an uneventful career.

== Background and description ==
Dalmate was one of the petit modèle of the Téméraire class that was specially intended for construction in some of the shipyards in countries occupied by the French, where there was less depth of water than in the main French shipyards. The ships had a length of 53.97 metres (177 ft 1 in), a beam of 14.29 metres (46 ft 11 in) and a depth of hold of 6.9 metres (22 ft 8 in). The ships displaced 2,781 tonneaux and had a mean draught of 6.72 metres (22 ft 1 in). They had a tonnage of 1,381 port tonneaux. Their crew numbered 705 officers and ratings during wartime. They were fitted with three masts and ship rigged.

The muzzle-loading, smoothbore armament of the Téméraire class consisted of twenty-eight 36-pounder long guns on the lower gun deck and thirty 18-pounder long guns on the upper gun deck. The petit modèle ships ordered in 1803–1804 were intended to mount sixteen 8-pounder long guns on their forecastle and quarterdeck, plus four 36-pounder obusiers on the poop deck (dunette). Later ships were intended to have fourteen 8-pounders and ten 36-pounder carronades without any obusiers, but the numbers of 8-pounders and carronades actually varied between a total of 20 to 26 weapons.

== Construction and career ==
Dalmate was ordered on 11 August 1806, laid down on 22 August in Antwerp and named on 2 July 1807. The ship was launched on 21 August 1808. She was commissioned on 24 April 1809 with a Danish crew who served until April 1813, when the ship was decommissioned. At the Bourbon Restoration in 1814, she was renamed Hector, changed to Dalmate during the Hundred Days, and to Hector back again after Napoléon's second abdication. She later served under Captain Baron Lemarant between 15 May to 22 June 1817, and Bergeret from 13 September, cruising the Caribbean and returning to Rochefort on 4 February 1818.
