= Jacques Bergeret =

French naval officer and admiral

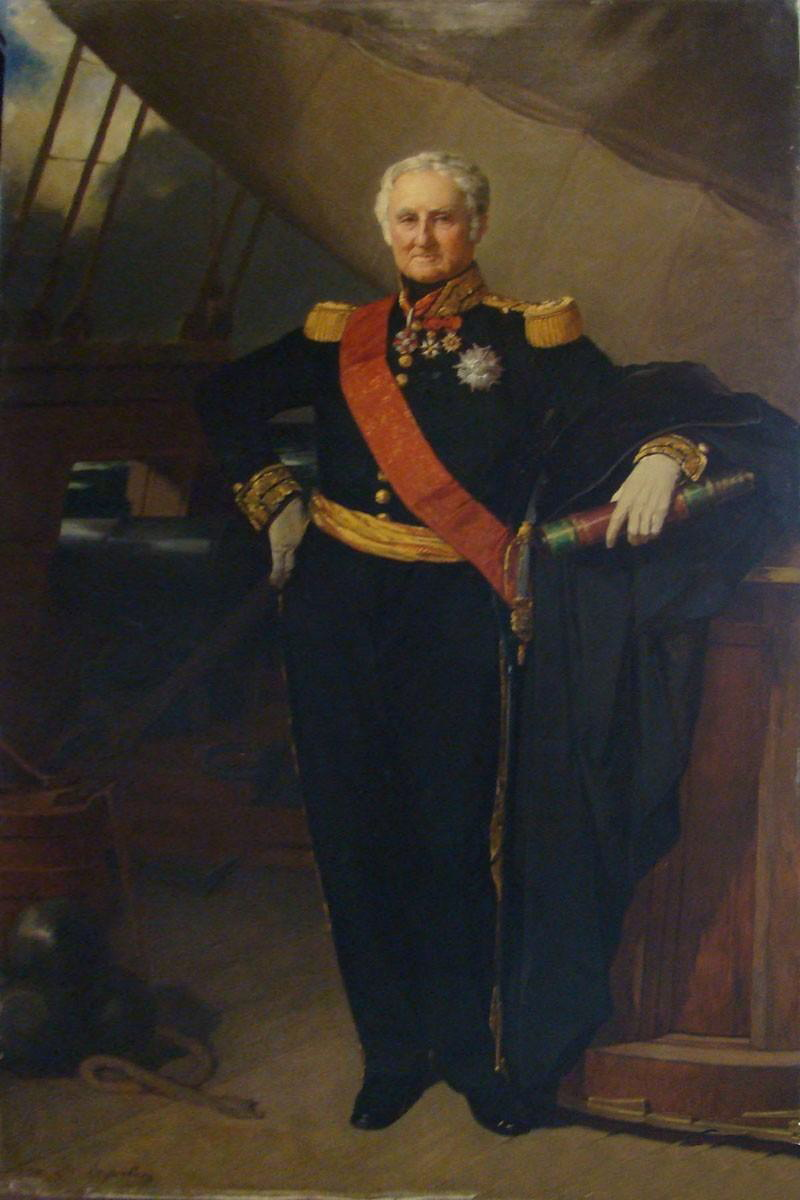
Portrait de l'amiral Bergeret.

Jacques Bergeret (French pronunciation: [ʒak bɛʁʒəʁɛ]; Bayonne, 15 May 1771 - Paris, 26 August 1857) was a French naval officer and admiral.

== Biography ==
Bergeret was born in Bayonne on 15 May 1771, and joined the merchant navy at the age of 12, when he sailed to Pondicherry aboard the merchantman Bayonnaise. Two years later, he volunteered for the French Royal Navy on the corvette Auguste, bound for an exploration campaign in the Red Sea.

In 1786, Bergeret returned to the merchant navy, and quickly rose to the rank of second lieutenant. Prior to 1792, he sailed mostly to Mauritius.

At the French Revolution, Bergeret joined the Navy as an ensign, in April 1793. He served in convoy escorts aboard the frigate Andromaque and later aboard the corvette Unité, notably fighting HMS Alceste.

Promoted to lieutenant, Bergeret was put in command of the frigate Virginie, and served in Villaret-Joyeuse's squadron in Brest. He distinguished himself in the Battle of Groix, and was promoted to Captain in March 1796.

On 22 April, Virginie encountered the division of Sir Edward Pellew, comprising the 44-gun razée HMS Indefatigable and the frigates HMS Argo, HMS Concord, HMS Révolutionnaire, HMS Amazon and their prize Unité, captured on 13 April.

Virginie retreated and the British squadron gave chase, joining with the French frigate around 23:00. Indefatigable closed in and exchanged broadsides, without succeeding in her attempts at raking Virginie. The gunnery exchange lasted for 4 hours, until the British frigates caught up. Bergeret then struck his colours in the face of an overwhelming opponent.

Bergeret was brought to England, and invited to stay at Pellew's mansion, near Plymouth. Bergeret and Pellew stayed in touch their entire life afterwards. After two years, Bergeret returned to Paris on parole to negotiate an exchange with Sidney Smith. The Directoire never consented, and Bergeret returned to London. When Smith escaped in 1798, the British government regarded the exchange as completed and released Bergeret.

Back in France, Bergeret was put in command of the 74-gun Dix-août, taking part in Bruix' expedition of 1799, and later of the 80-gun Foudroyant.

At the Peace of Amiens, Bergeret resigned his commission and sailed to Mauritius, where he armed a merchantman, the Psyché.

In 1804, Bergeret was reinstated and Psyché was bought by Decaen and commissioned in the Navy as a frigate. Bergeret raided commerce on Psyché until 14 February, when a naval battle opposing Psyché, Équivoque and Thetis to HMS San Fiorenzo ended with Psyché's capture. Bergeret was Pellew's prisoner for the second time. Exchanged after a brief captivity, Bergeret was put in command of the Créole and ordered back to France with reports and despatches.

In February 1809, Bergeret was put in command of the Rochefort station, raising his pennant on the 80-gun Ville de Varsovie. He was supposed to have received reinforcements from Willaumez' squadron, but Willaumez ended up entangled in the Battle of Les Sables-d'Olonne, without support from Bergeret. Bergeret and Willaumez fought over the responsibility for the fiasco, and Napoleon removed them both, replacing them with vice-admiral Zacharie Allemand. Bergeret remained out of favour until the end of the Empire.

At the Bourbon Restoration, Bergeret was put in command of a division to ferry Russian prisoners of war back home. During the Hundred Days, Decrès did not attempt to recruit him, which eased his subsequent career under the monarchy. In 1817, Bergeret led an expedition to retake possession of French Guyane, with his pennant on Hector. He later had command of the 80-gun Neptune, the Duc de Berry, and the Foudroyant.

Promoted to contre-amiral in 1819, he commanded the Caribbean station and took part in the Admiralty Council. He rose to Vice-Admiral in 1831, under the Monarchy of July, and received appointment as préfet maritime of Brest. From 1835, he served as vice-president of the Admiralty Council, and he became a Pair de France in 1841.

He retired from the Navy in 1848, and became a Senator at the beginning of the Second Empire. By then, he was the last living captain of the French Revolution.

Bergeret died in 1857 and was buried in Brest.

== Honours ==
- Grand Cross of the Legion of Honour
- Knight of the Order of Saint Louis
- Knight of the Order of Saint Anna (Russia)
- Pair de France
- Baron d'Empire

== Sources ==
- Pierre-Marie-Joseph Bonnefoux, Mémoires du baron de Bonnefoux, capitaine de vaisseau 1782-1855, Paris, Plon-Nourrit et cie, 1900, p. 65.
- Michael Durey, The British Secret Service and the escape of Sir Sidney from Paris 1798, History, July 1999, n° 275.
- William James, The Naval History of Great Britain during the French Revolutionary and Napoleon’s wars, Londres 1837; réédition récente par Conway Maritime Press, Londres, 2003, tome 1, 2 et 4.
- Edward Osley, Life of Lord Exmouth, London, 1840.
- Danièle et Bernard Quintin, Dictionnaire des capitaines de vaisseau de Napoléon, S.P.M., Paris, 2003.
