= Pierre-François Cornic Dumoulin =

Pierre-François Cornic Dumoulin (23 July 1731 – 11 April 1801) was a French Navy officer who took part in the Battle of Groix as captain of the 74-gun ship of the line Droits de l'Homme.
