= HMS Abeille =

Cutter of the Royal Navy

History

France
- Name: Bonnet Rouge
- Namesake: Honey bee
- Ordered: 18 May 1793
- Builder: Saint Malo
- Laid down: June 1793
- Launched: October 1793
- Commissioned: 12 November 1793
- Renamed: Abeille (1795)
- Captured: May 1796

- Name: HMS Abeille
- Acquired: 2 May 1796 by capture
- Fate: Broken up 1798

General characteristics
- Displacement: 135 tons (French)
- Tons burthen: 80 (French; "of load")
- Length: 19.49 m (63.9 ft) (overall); 17.21 m (56.5 ft) (keel)
- Beam: 6.50 m (21.3 ft)
- Complement: 65 (70 at capture)
- Armament: 10 × 4-pounder guns

HMS Abeille (French pronunciation: [abɛj]) was a French Navy 14-gun cutter launched in 1793 under the name Bonnet Rouge that HMS Dryad captured in 1796. She was taken into the Royal Navy as HMS Abeille, but apparently never served and was broken up in 1798.

== French service and capture ==
Abeille was a Montagne-class cutter built to a design by Daniel Denÿs and launched in October 1793 at Saint-Malo as Bonnet Rouge.

Between March and July 1795, while under the command of ensigne de vaiseau Denis, she cruised between Brest and Loctudy, and return. She then cruised in the Gulf of Gascony with the division under the command of Contre-Admiral Vence. She was at the First Battle of Groix in June 1795, but like all the smaller vessels, did not participate in the action.

She was officially renamed Abeille on 30 May 1795. Later, under the command of lieutenant de vaisseau Denis-Lagarde, she was stationed at the Île de Batz.

On 2 May 1796, Dryad, under Acting-Commander John Pullin, captured Abeille some 16 or 17 leagues off The Lizard. At the time, Abeille was three days out of Brest and had not taken anything. The Royal Navy took her into service under her existing name.

== Fate ==
There is no record that HMS Abeille ever actually served in the Royal Navy. She was broken up in 1798.
