= Cornwallis's Retreat =

1795 battle of the War of the First Coalition

- Part of the War of the First Coalition
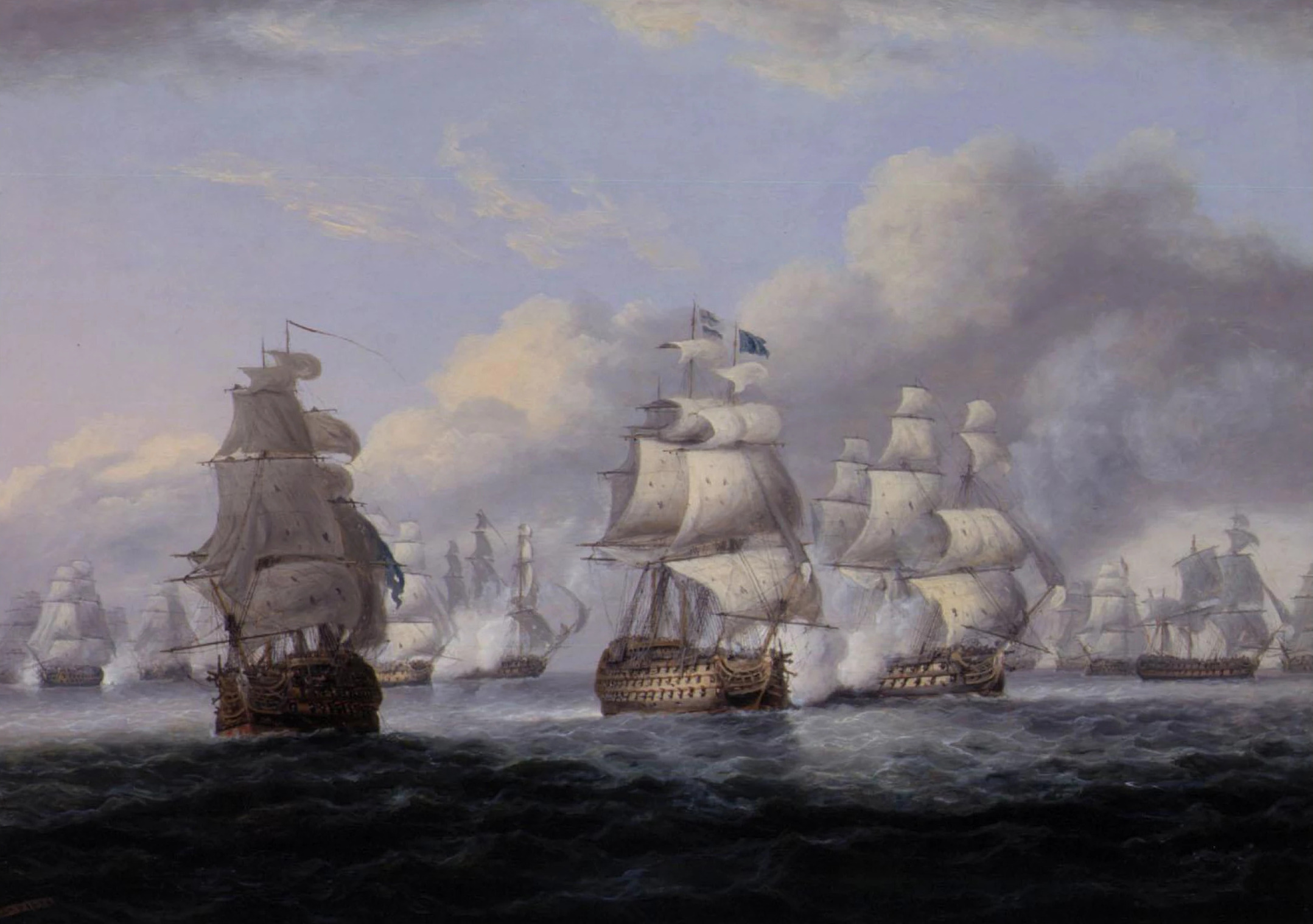
- Painting of the battle by Thomas Luny
Date	16–17 June 1795
Location	Off Brittany, Atlantic Ocean
Result	British victory

Belligerents
Great Britain	France

Commanders and leaders
William Cornwallis	Villaret de Joyeuse

Strength
5 ships of the line 2 frigates (OOB)	12 ships of the line 11 frigates (OOB)

Casualties and losses
12 wounded	29 killed or wounded

Cornwallis's Retreat was a naval engagement during the French Revolutionary Wars in which a British Royal Navy squadron of five ships of the line and two frigates was attacked by a much larger French Navy fleet of 12 ships of the line and 11 frigates. The action took place in the waters off the west coast of Brittany on 16–17 June 1795 (28–29 Prairial an III of the French Republican Calendar).

A British naval squadron under Vice-Admiral William Cornwallis began operating off Brittany on 7 June; in the following week he attacked a French merchant convoy and captured several ships. In response, Vice-admiral Louis Thomas Villaret de Joyeuse led the main French fleet out of port to attack the British, who were spotted on 16 June. Heavily outnumbered, Cornwallis turned away from the French and attempted to escape into open water, with the French fleet in pursuit. After a full day's chase the British squadron lost speed, due to poorly loaded holds on two of their ships, and the French vanguard pulled within range on the morning of 17 June. Unwilling to abandon his rearguard, Cornwallis counter-attacked with the rest of his squadron. A fierce combat developed, culminating in Cornwallis interposing his flagship HMS Royal Sovereign between the British and French forces.

Cornwallis's determined resistance, and his squadron's signals to a group of unknown ships spotted in the distance, led Villaret de Joyeuse to believe that the main British Channel Fleet was approaching. Villaret therefore broke off the battle on the evening of 17 June and ordered his ships to withdraw. This allowed Cornwallis to escape; he returned to port at Plymouth with his squadron battered but intact. Villaret withdrew to an anchorage off Belle Île, close to the naval base at Brest. The French fleet was discovered there by the main British Channel Fleet on 22 June and defeated at the ensuing Battle of Groix, losing three ships of the line. Villaret was criticised by contemporaries for failing to press the attack on Cornwallis's force, whilst the British admiral was praised and rewarded for his defiance in the face of overwhelming French numerical superiority. The battle has since been considered by British historians to be one of the most influential examples "of united courage and coolness to be found in [British] naval history".

== Background ==
By the late spring of 1795 Britain and France had been at war for more than two years, with the British Royal Navy's Channel Fleet, known at the time as the "Western Squadron" exerting superiority in the campaign for dominance in the Bay of Biscay and the Western Approaches. The British, led first by Lord Howe and then by Lord Bridport sailing from their bases at Plymouth, Portsmouth and Torbay, maintained an effective distant blockade against the French naval bases on the Atlantic, especially the large harbour of Brest in Brittany. Although French squadrons could occasionally put to sea without interception, the main French fleet had suffered a series of setbacks in the preceding two years, most notably at the battle of the Glorious First of June in 1794 at which the fleet lost seven ships of the line and then during the Croisière du Grand Hiver during the winter of 1794–1795 when five ships of the line were wrecked during a sortie into the Bay of Biscay at the height of the Atlantic winter storm season.

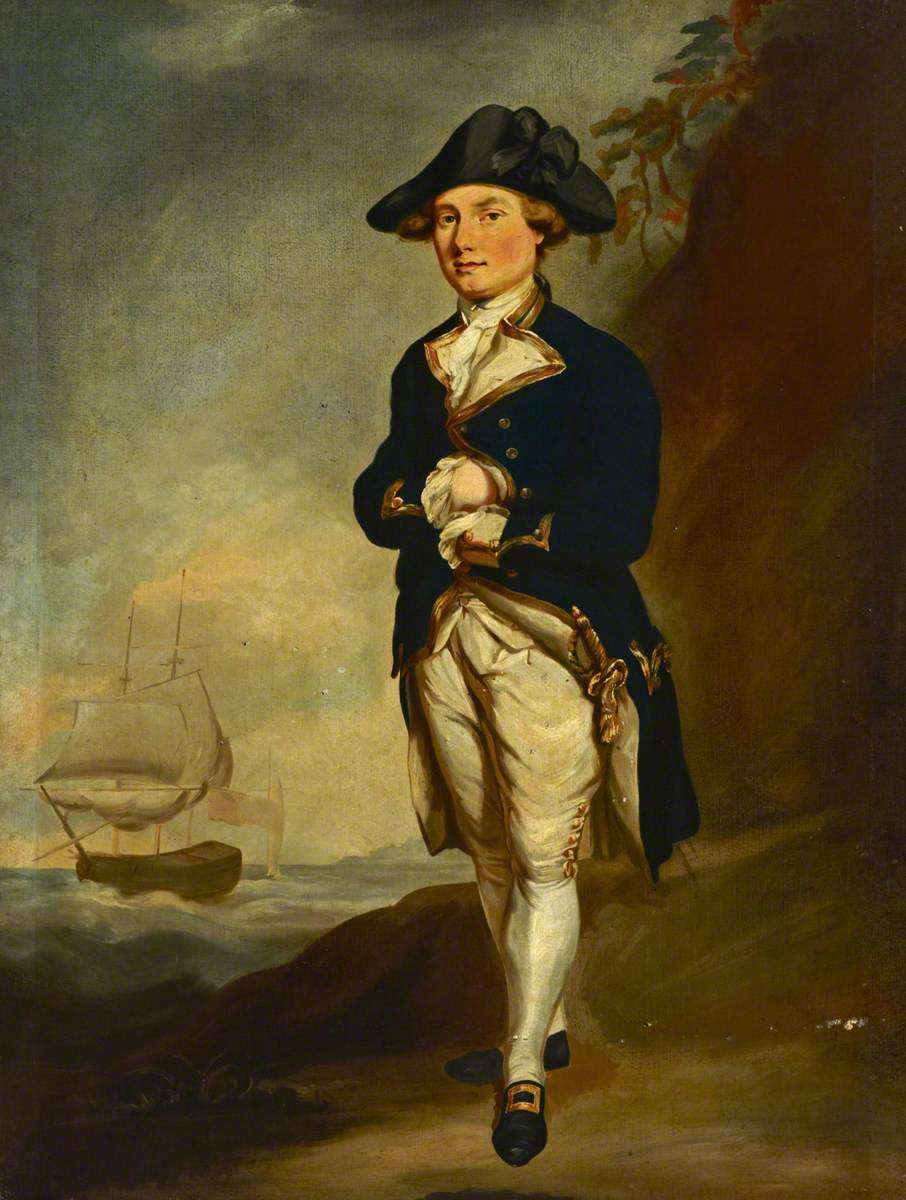
William Cornwallis, the British commander at the engagement

The damage the French Trans-Atlantic fleet had suffered in the winter operation took months to repair and it was not in a condition to sail again until June 1795, although several squadrons had put to sea in the meanwhile. One such squadron consisted of three ships of the line and a number of frigates under Counter-admiral Jean Gaspard Vence sent to Bordeaux to escort a merchant convoy up the coast to Brest. The British Channel Fleet had briefly sortied from Torbay in February in response to the Croisière du Grand Hiver and subsequently retired to Spithead, from where a squadron of five ships of the line and two frigates were sent on 30 May to patrol the approaches to Brest and to watch the French fleet.

The force consisted of the 100-gun first-rate ship of the line HMS Royal Sovereign (1786), the 74-gun ships of the line HMS Mars (1794), HMS Triumph (1764), HMS Brunswick (1790) and HMS Bellerophon (1786), the frigates HMS Phaeton (1782) and HMS Pallas (1793) and the small brig-sloop HMS Kingfisher (1782), under the overall command of Vice-admiral William Cornwallis in Royal Sovereign. Cornwallis was a highly experienced naval officer who had been in service with the Navy since 1755 and fought in the Seven Years' War and the American Revolutionary War, including the significant naval victories over the French at the Battle of Quiberon Bay in 1759 and the Battle of the Saintes in 1782.

== Operations off Belle Île ==
Cornwallis led his squadron southwest, rounding Ushant on the night of 7–8 June and cruising southwards down the Breton coast past the Penmarck Rocks. At 10:30 that morning, Captain Sir Erasmus Gower on Triumph signalled that he could see six sails to the northeast. Cornwallis turned the squadron to investigate, and discovered the small squadron under Vence in command of a large merchant convoy. Vence initially held his course when Cornwallis's squadron appeared, in the belief that they were French. When he realised his mistake at 12:00, he ordered his ships to make all sail towards the anchorage in the shelter of the fortified island of Belle Île. Vence's squadron made rapid progress towards the anchorage, but Cornwallis had sent his faster ships ahead, Phaeton, Kingfisher and Triumph in the lead, while Brunswick, which had been badly loaded when at anchor in Spithead and thus was unable to sail smoothly, fell far behind. The leading British ships were able to fire on Vence's force at a distance, and attacked the trailing merchant ships and their frigate escorts, forcing a French frigate to abandon a merchant ship it had under tow, but could not bring Vence to action without the support of the slower vessels in Cornwallis's squadron. As a result, all of the French warships and all but eight of the merchant vessels were safely anchored at Belle Île. Triumph and Phaeton both advanced on the anchored ships, but came under heavy fire from batteries on the island and found that the water was too shallow and the passage too uncertain to risk their ships. Phaeton lost one man killed and seven wounded before Cornwallis called off the attack.

Taking his eight prizes laden with wine and brandy, Cornwallis retired to the sheltered anchorage of Palais Road, close to Belle Île, where the squadron remained until 9 June. In the evening, Cornwallis took advantage of a fresh breeze to sail his ships out into the Bay of Biscay and around the Ushant headland, reaching the Scilly Isles on 11 June and sending Kingfisher back to Spithead with the French prizes and two American merchant ships seized in French waters. Cornwallis then ordered the squadron to turn back to the blockade of Brest in the hope of encountering Vence in more favourable circumstances. At Brest, messages had arrived warning that Vence and the convoy were "blockaded" at Belle Île and the French commander was instructed to rescue him. In fact, as was pointed out by a number of officers in the French fleet including Vice-admiral Yves-Joseph de Kerguelen-Trémarec, the anchorage at Belle Île could never be effectively blockaded as it was too open to block all potential approaches and too close to the major port of Lorient and therefore a rescue was unnecessary. This advice was ignored, and Vice-admiral Louis Thomas Villaret de Joyeuse sailed from Brest on 12 June with the ships that were anchored in Brest Roads ready for sea. Villaret's fleet consisted of nine ships of the line, nine frigates (including two ships of the line razeed into 50-gun frigates) and four corvettes.

On 15 June, the French fleet encountered Vence's squadron sailing off the island of Groix near Lorient, and the two joined, Vence having sent the remainder of his convoy safely to Brest while Villaret was en route. Turning north back towards Brest, the French fleet was off Penmarck Point at 10:30 on 16 June with the wind in the northwest, when sails were spotted to the northwest. This force was Cornwallis's squadron, returning to Belle Île in search of Vence. Sighting his numerically inferior opponent to windward, Villaret immediately ordered his fleet to advance on the British force while Cornwallis, anticipating Vence's merchant convoy and not immediately apprehending the danger his squadron was in, sent Phaeton to investigate the sails on the horizon.

== Retreat ==
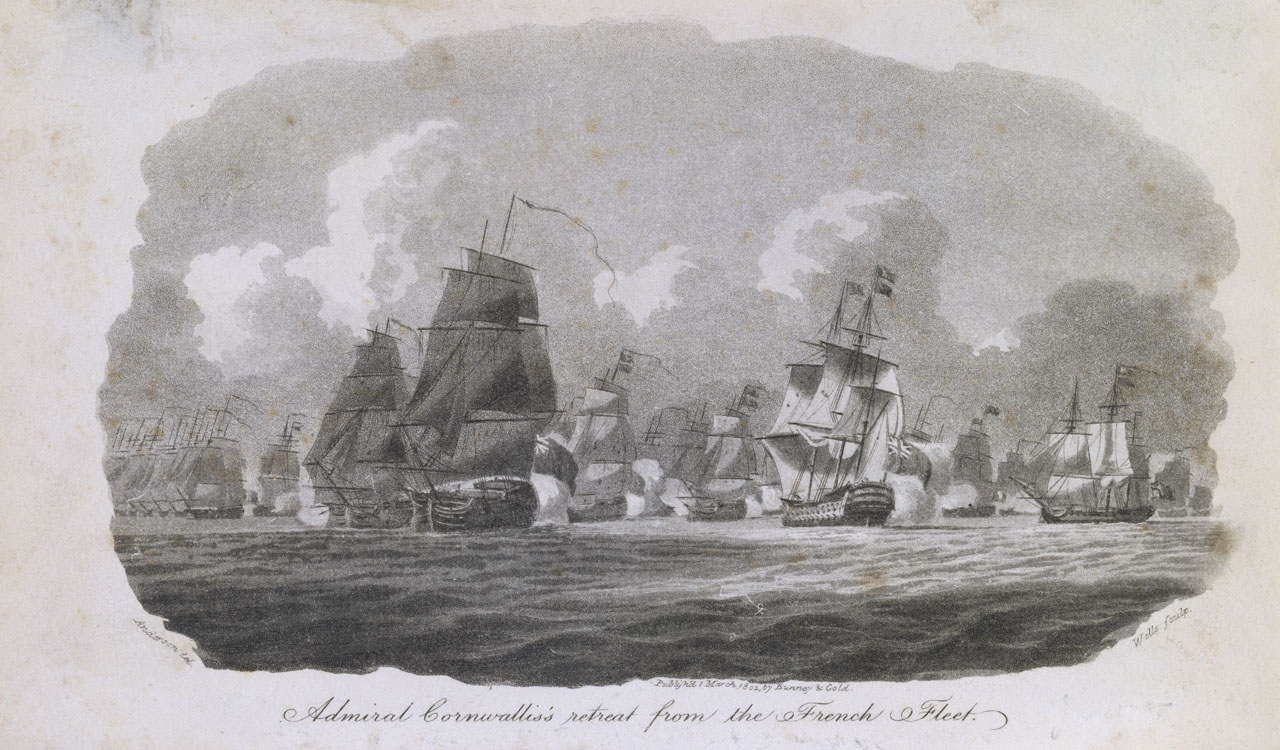
1802 engraving of the battle

Captain Robert Stopford on Phaeton signaled to Cornwallis that the French fleet contained 30 vessels, but did not return to join Cornwallis, causing the British admiral to misunderstand the signal to mean that the French ships, while more numerous than his own, were of inferior strength. Under this misapprehension, Cornwallis, who could only see the ship's sails rather than their hulls, ordered his squadron to advance on the French fleet. Stopford subsequently signaled the exact composition of Villaret's fleet at 11:00 and Cornwallis, realising his error, issued urgent orders for his squadron to haul away to the southwest, tacking to starboard in an effort to escape pursuit with Brunswick leading the line, followed by Royal Sovereign, Bellerophon, Triumph and Mars. Phaeton was sent to scout ahead, while Pallas was ordered to keep company with Royal Sovereign in order to relay Cornwallis's signals to the rest of the squadron. Villaret had immediately ordered his fleet to give chase, and the French followed the British south westwards into the Atlantic, taking advantage of the strengthening wind.

At 14:00 Villaret split his forces, one division sailing northwards to take advantage of the breeze coming off the land, while the other maintained passage to the south. Cornwallis tacked his squadron at 06:00 and 17:00, but Villaret de Joyeuse's plan worked well and a shift in the wind at 18:00 allowed the northern squadron to weather and the southern to lay up, the British squadron now lying directly between them about 9 nautical miles (17 km) from either French division. During the night the chase continued into the Atlantic, the British squadron struggling to maintain formation due to the slow speed of two members: Brunswick's sailing deficiencies had already been noted, but it became clear that Bellerophon was similarly suffering. In an effort to decrease the weight of the ships and thus increase their speed and allow them to keep pace with the rest of the squadron, captains Lord Charles Fitzgerald and Lord Cranstoun ordered the anchors, boats and much of the provisions and fresh water carried aboard to be thrown over the side: Bellerophon was sailing so slowly that Cranstoun even ordered four carronades to be jettisoned with a large amount of roundshot.

During the night Villaret had split his forces further, creating a windward division of three ships of the line and five frigates, a centre division of five ships of the line and four frigates and the lee division of four ships of the line, five frigates and three smaller vessels. Of these forces, the weather division was closest to Cornwallis's squadron and at 09:00 the leading French ship Zélé began to fire on the British rearguard ship, Mars under Captain Sir Charles Cotton. Cotton returned fire with his stern-chasers, but was unable to prevent the 40-gun frigate Virginie from approaching his ship's port quarter and firing repeated broadsides at Mars. The rest of the French frigates held station to windward of the British force without approaching within range. Concerned that Bellerophon, which was close to the developing action, might lose a sail, a loss that Cranstoun would be unable to replace, Cornwallis ordered Triumph and Royal Sovereign to fall back and allow Bellerophon to join Brunswick in the vanguard.

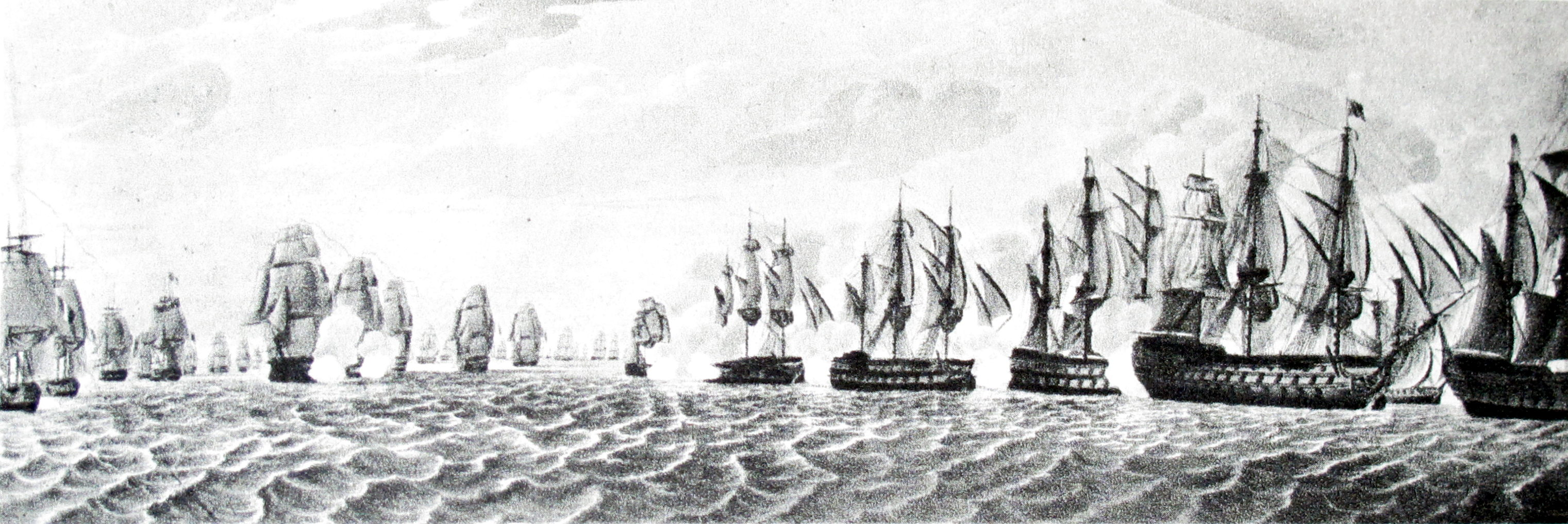
First phase: the two squadrons fight each other

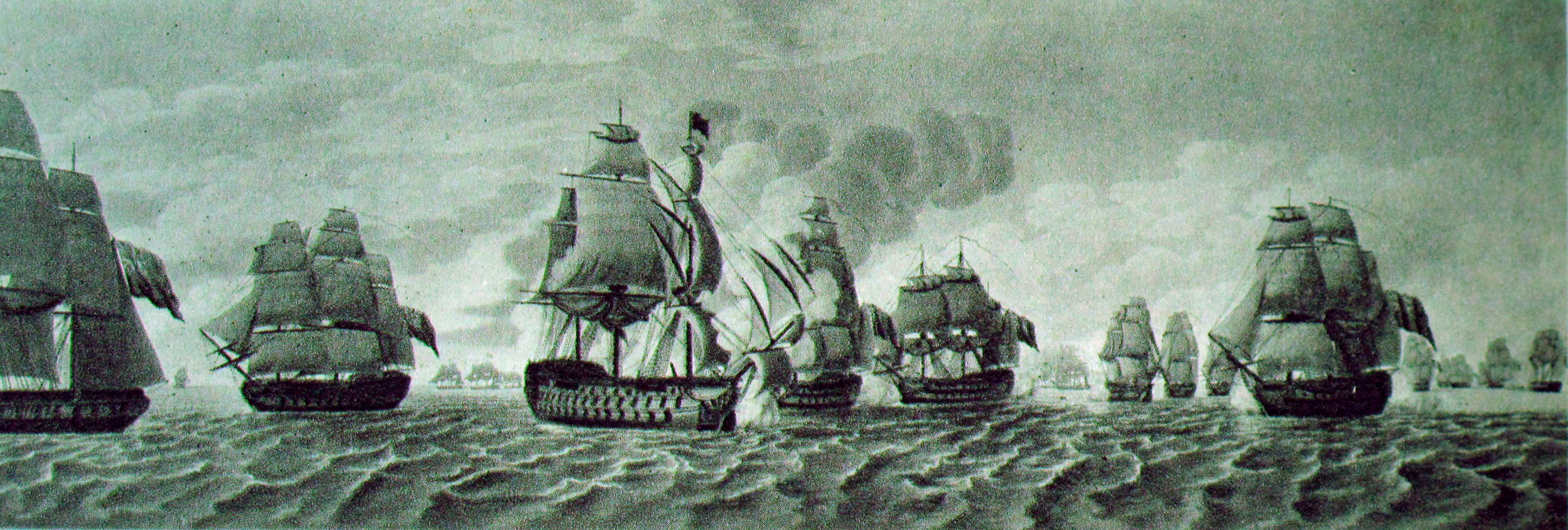
Second phase: the French attacking HMS Mars

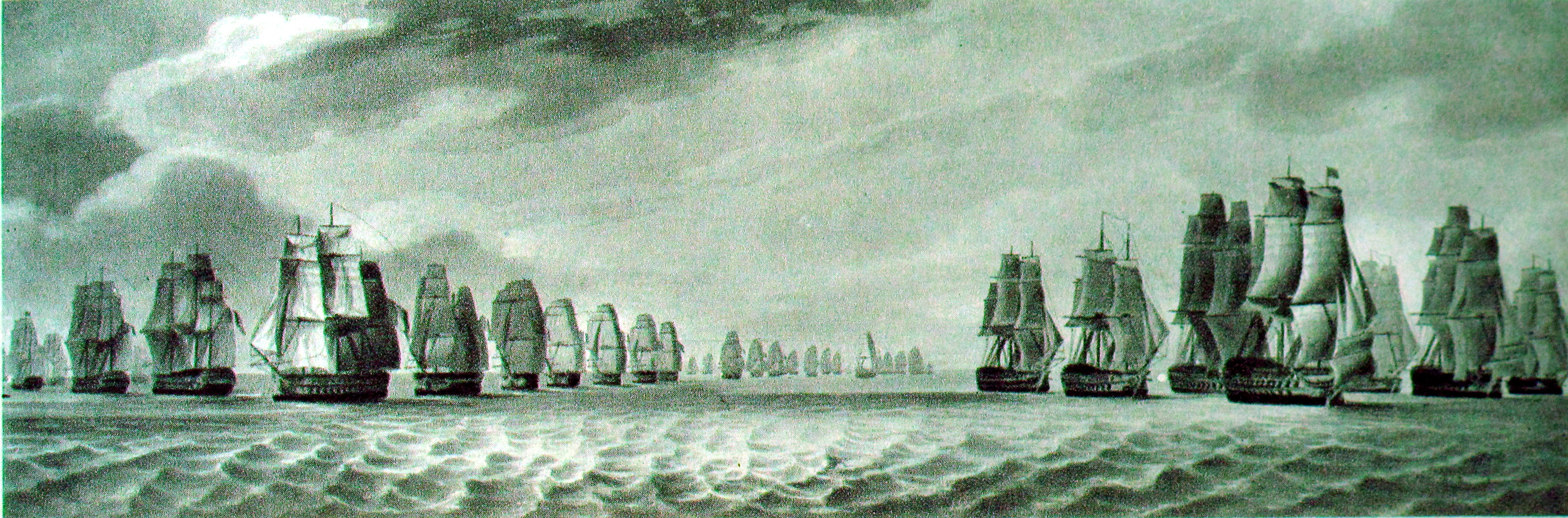
Last phase: the French squadron withdrawing

Following the reorganisation, the entire British squadron was now within range of the leading French ships, all firing at Villaret's advancing line. To facilitate the positioning of more cannon in the stern of the vessels, the British captains ordered their men to cut holes in the stern planks: so many were cut that several ships needed extensive repairs in the aftermath of the action and Triumph especially had much of her stern either cut or shot away. At 13:30 the British fire achieved some success when Zélé fell back with damaged rigging, allowing the second French ship to take up the position at the head of the line. This ship, which had been firing distantly on the British force for half an hour, opened a heavy fire on Mars as did a number of following French ships over the ensuing hours, including Droits de l’Homme, Formidable and Tigre. This combined attack left Mars badly damaged in the rigging and sails, causing the ship to slow. Cotton's ship now seemed at serious risk of falling into the midst of the French fleet and being overwhelmed, while Captain Gower's Triumph was also badly damaged by French shot. Seeing the danger his rearguard was in, Cornwallis took decisive action, ordering Cotton to turn away from the French and swinging Royal Sovereign southwards, he led Triumph to Mars's rescue, drawing close alongside and engaging the leading French ships with a series of broadsides from his powerful first rate. The raking fire of Royal Sovereign caused the four French ships closing on Mars to retreat, and gradually the entire French fleet fell back, distant firing continuing until 18:10 when the French fell out of range, although they continued in pursuit of the battered and weakened British squadron.

At 18:40, suddenly and for no immediately apparent reason, Villaret ordered his ships to haul their wind and turn back towards the east, breaking off contact. By the time the sun set a few hours later, the French had almost disappeared over the eastern horizon as the British continued westwards. Although the order to abandon the action has subsequently been much debated, the cause of Villaret's retreat was in fact the actions of the frigate Phaeton, which Cornwallis had sent ahead of the squadron as a scout early on 17 June. After progressing several miles ahead of the British squadron, Stopford had signalled that there were unknown sails to the northwest, followed by signals indicating four ships in sight and then one for a full fleet, highlighted by firing two cannon. Stopford had been careful to ensure that the French ships could see and read his signals, which were in a code that the French were known to have broken, and Villaret knew well that the only French fleet in those waters was the one he led. He therefore assumed that Phaeton could see the Channel Fleet beyond the northern horizon, a force significantly more powerful than his own. Stopford compounded the ruse at 15:00 by making a string of nonsensical signals to the non-existent fleet before notifying Cornwallis at 16:30, again in plain sight, that the fleet was composed of allied ships of the line. He completed the operation by raising the Dutch flag and signalling for the non-existent fleet to join with Cornwallis. It is not clear to what extent Villaret was taken in by this charade, the French fleet continuing their attack without pause, until at 18:00 when a number of sails appeared on the northwest horizon. At this point Phaeton wore round to return to Cornwallis, and Villaret, now convinced that the strangers, which were in reality a small convoy of merchant vessels, were the vanguard of the Channel Fleet, abandoned the chase.

== Aftermath ==
"such a retreat . . . reflects as much honour on the abilities of the man who conducted it, as would the achievement of the most splendid victory."
The Naval Chronicle, Vol. VII, pp. 20–25

With the French fleet out of sight, Cornwallis ordered his squadron north against the northeast wind, returning through the English Channel to Plymouth for repairs. Phaeton was sent ahead with despatches intended to warn Lord Bridport that the French fleet was at sea and inform him of Cornwallis's safety. However, Bridport had already sailed on 12 June with 15 ships of the line as a cover for a secondary force detailed to land a British and French Royalist army at Quiberon Bay, and the main British fleet was already off Brest when the action between Cornwallis and Villaret de Joyeuse was fought. The ships of Cornwallis's squadron had all suffered damage, especially Triumph and Mars: Triumph had to have extensive repairs to its stern, which had been heavily cut away during the action. Historian Edward Pelham Brenton credits this action with influencing Robert Seppings in his future designs of ships of the line, providing rounded sterns that offered a wider field of fire at pursuing warships. Casualties were light however, with just 12 men wounded on Mars and no other losses on the remainder of the squadron.

The French fleet was only lightly damaged and had only taken light casualties of 29 men killed and wounded. Villaret continued the fleet's passage eastwards, rounding Penmarck Point and entering Audierne Bay on the passage north towards Brest when the region was hit by a fierce 27-hour gale, driving the French fleet southwards and dispersing them across the coastline. Over the ensuing days Villaret was able to reconstitute his fleet in the anchorage off Belle Île where Vence had laid up on 8 June. When the fleet was all assembled, Villaret again ordered it to sail north in an effort to regain Brest. His fleet had originally sailed from Brest in such a rush due to the perceived danger to Vence's squadron that it was only carrying 15 days worth of provisions on board and had now been at sea for ten days, making a return to Brest a priority. At 03:30 on 22 June, as the French fleet passed north along the coast, the British Channel Fleet appeared to the northwest, Bridport having discovered the French fleet absent from Brest and cast southwards to protect the Quiberon invasion convoy.

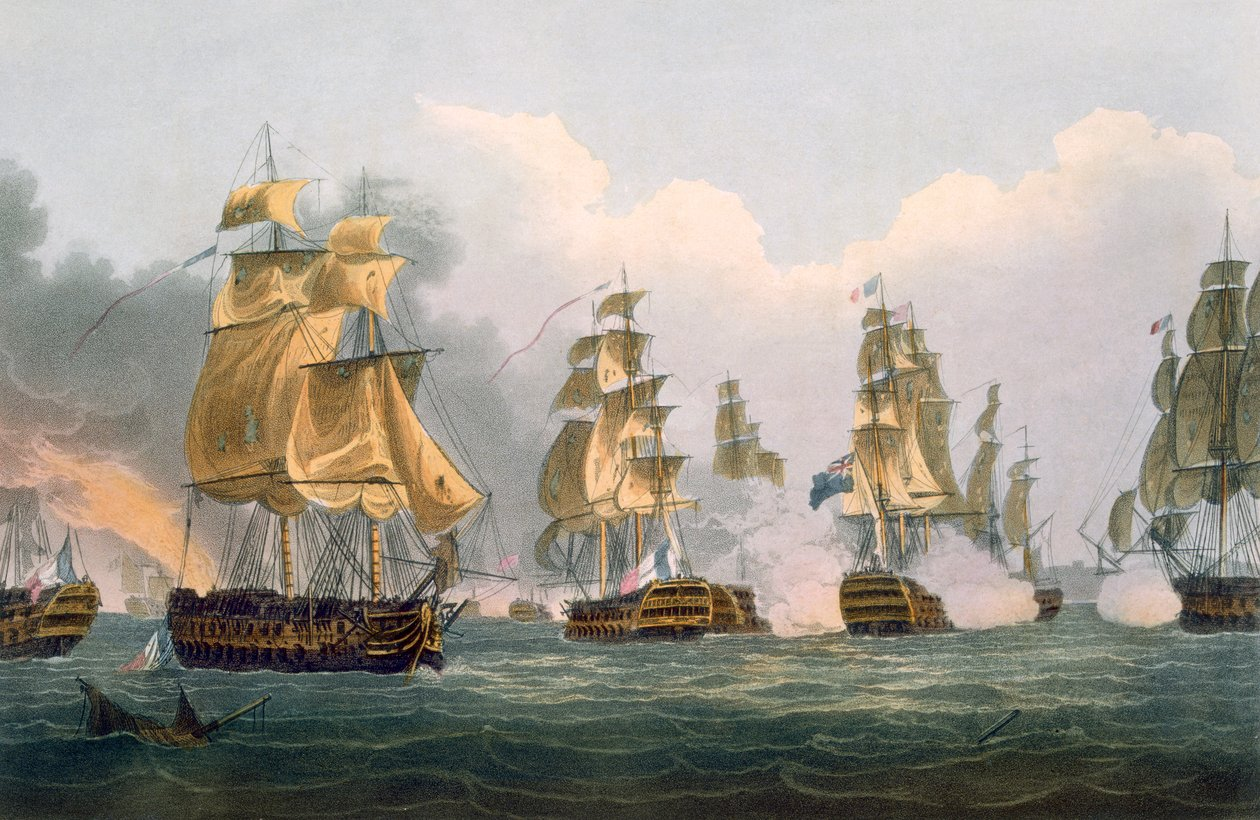
The Battle of Groix, where Villaret suffered another defeat

Villaret considered the newly arrived British fleet to be significantly superior to his own and retreated before it, sailing towards the French coast with the intention of sheltering in the protected coastal waters around the island of Groix and returning to Brest from this position. Bridport instructed his fleet to pursue the French force, and a chase developed lasting the day of 22 June and into the early morning of 23 June, when Bridport's leading ships caught the stragglers at the rear of Villaret's fleet off the island. In a sharp engagement known as the Battle of Groix, three ships were overrun and attacked, suffering heavy damage and casualties before surrendering. Others were damaged, but at 08:37, with most of his fleet still unengaged and the French scattered along the coast, Bridport suddenly called off the action and instructed his ships to gather their prizes and retire, a decision that was greatly criticised by contemporary officers and later historians.

In France, Villaret's failure to press his attack against Cornwallis's squadron was blamed on a number of factors, including accusations that the captains of the French ships leading the attack had deliberately disobeyed orders to engage the British and that they were unable to effectively manoeuvre their vessels. It was also insisted by several of the French officers present that the sails on the northwest horizon really had been Bridport's fleet and that this was the only factor that had induced them to disengage. Villaret placed much of the blame on Captain Jean-Charles-François Aved-Magnac of Zélé, whom he accused of withdrawing from the action prematurely and disobeying orders. Magnac was later court-martialed and dismissed from the French Navy. In Britain, the battle was celebrated as one of the most notable actions of the early years of the conflict, an attitude encouraged by the modesty of Cornwallis's dispatch to the Admiralty, which when describing how he had faced down an entire French fleet at the climax of the action wrote only that the French had "made a Shew of a more ferious attack upon the Mars . . . and obliged me to bear up for her Support [sic]." He did however subsequently note of his men that

"Indeed I shall ever feel the Impression which the good Conduct of the Captains, Officers, Seamen, Marines and Soldiers in the Squadron has made on my Mind; and it was the greatest Pleasure I ever received to see the Spirit manifested by the Men, who, instead of being cast down at seeing Thirty sail of the Enemy's Ships attacking our little Squadron, were in the highest Spirits imaginable . . . Could common Prudence have allowed me to loose their Valour, I hardly know what might not have been accomplished by such Men."

— Vice-Admiral William Cornwallis's official despatch, printed in the London Gazette on 23 June 1795

Cornwallis was given the thanks of both Houses of Parliament, but fell out of favour with the Admiralty in October 1795 in a dispute about naval discipline and was court-martialed and censured in 1796 for abandoning a convoy to the West Indies due to damage to Royal Sovereign and ill-health. He entered retirement that year, but in 1801 he was given command of the Channel Fleet by Earl St Vincent and for the next five years led the blockade of the French Atlantic Fleet, most notably during the Trafalgar campaign of 1805 when he sent reinforcements to the fleet under Vice-Admiral Lord Nelson at a critical juncture. British historians have highly praised the conduct of Cornwallis and his men at the unequal battle: In 1825 Brenton wrote that Cornwallis's Retreat is "justly considered one of the finest displays of united courage and coolness to be found in our naval history." while in 1827 William James wrote of the "masterly retreat of Vice-admiral Cornwallis" in which "the spirit manifested by the different ships' companies of his little squadron, while pressed upon by a force from its threefold superiority so capable of crushing them, was just as ought always to animate British seamen when in the presence of an enemy." Modern historian Robert Gardiner echoed this sentiment, noting in 1998 that "'Cornwallis's Retreat' became as famous as many of the Royal Navy's real victories."

== Notes ==
1. Note A: There was heated early debate between historians Edward Pelham Brenton and William James about Cornwallis's tactics in the action. Brenton claimed in his 1825 account that Cornwallis had formed his ships in wedge formation with Royal Sovereign as the lynchpin that was closest to the French. James refuted this in his 1827 account, describing Cornwallis's formation as a line of battle that he subsequently broke to provide support to the embattled Mars. James comments on Brenton's account, and some inconsistent errors in the maps of the action drawn up by Charles Ekins, noting that his version of events is based on the ship's log-books. In his 1837 edition, by which time James was long dead, Brenton maintains his account and dismisses James' accusations of inaccuracy with a sarcastic comment.

== Bibliography ==
- Brenton, Edward Pelham (1837) [1825]. The Naval History of Great Britain, Vol. I. London: C. Rice. "edward pelham brenton."
- Clowes, William Laird (1997) [1900]. The Royal Navy, A History from the Earliest Times to 1900, Volume IV. London: Chatham Publishing. ISBN 1-86176-013-2.
- Gardiner, Robert, ed. (2001) [1996]. Fleet Battle and Blockade. Caxton Editions. ISBN 978-1-84067-363-0.
- James, William (2002) [1827]. The Naval History of Great Britain, Volume 1, 1793–1796. London: Conway Maritime Press. ISBN 0-85177-905-0.
- Rouvier, Charles (1868). "Crosière dans l'océan". Histoire des marins français sous la République, de 1789 à 1803. Paris: Librairie Maritime at Scientifique. p. 205. "Combat de Groix."
- Tracy, Nicholas, ed. (1998). "Cornwallis's Retreat". The Naval Chronicle, Volume 1, 1793–1798. Chatham Publishing. ISBN 1-86176-091-4.
- Woodman, Richard (2001). The Sea Warriors. Constable Publishers. ISBN 1-84119-183-3.
