= John Monkton =

Rear-Admiral John Monkton
- Born: c. 1754
- Died: October 1826; Le Havre, France
- Military career
- Allegiance: United Kingdom
- Branch: Royal Navy
- Service years: 1766–1814
- Conflicts: American Revolutionary War; Great Siege of Gibraltar; Action of 20–21 April 1782; French Revolutionary Wars; Glorious First of June; Battle of Groix

Rear-Admiral John Monkton (c. 1754 – October 1826) was a Royal Navy officer of the late eighteenth century who is best known for his service in the French Revolutionary Wars as a commander of a ship of the line seeing action in several engagements, particularly the Battle of Groix in 1795. Monkton was later embroiled in Admiralty politics and fell out with Earl St. Vincent which resulted in his enforced retirement.

== Life ==
John Monkton was born in the mid-1750s, and joined the Royal Navy in 1766, serving in a succession of ships for short periods, including HMS Chatham, HMS Lark, HMS Aurora, HMS Carysfort, HMS Maidstone and HMS Boreas. He was noted for serving on a surprising number of ships that were later wrecked: Aurora was lost within months of his being replaced, Carysfort was almost wrecked three times while he was in the crew and Lark was lost in the American Revolutionary War. It was in this conflict, serving in Maidstone, that he saw his first action, capturing hundreds of enemy merchant vessels operating from the Leeward Islands.

In 1777 he returned to Britain and was promoted to lieutenant, serving on the hired armed ship Two Sisters off Northern Scotland. In 1779 he joined the frigate HMS Vestal, then under the command of Captain George Cranfield Berkeley, with whom Monkton was to have a lengthy and productive professional relationship. In this frigate, Monkton raided French shipping off Newfoundland and twice escorted convoys relieving Gibraltar during the Great Siege. Vestal also served at the destruction of a French convoy in the action of 20–21 April 1782.

Following the end of the war, Monkton joined HMS Ardent, transferring to HMS Windsor Castle during the Nootka Crisis and briefly joining HMS Niger following the outbreak of the French Revolutionary Wars in 1793, before transferring with Captain Berkeley to the ship of the line HMS Marlborough. In Marlborough, Monkton fought at the battle of the Glorious First of June, fighting a number of French ships and taking command of Marlborough when Berkeley was seriously wounded. For his efforts in the battle, Monkton was promoted to commander and took temporary command of HMS Colossus which was heavily engaged at the Battle of Groix in 1795.

Following the battle, Monkton was made post captain but not employed again until 1799 when he became Berkeley's flag captain on HMS Mars in 1801 however, Berkeley resigned his ship after a disagreement with Earl St. Vincent and Monkton was replaced. He never served at sea again, and in 1814 was superannuated – promoted to rear-admiral and forced to retire from service. Monkton married three times, first to Charlotte Slade, who died in 1806. Then to Charlotte Mackie, who also subsequently died, and finally in 1818 to Elizabeth Patience. He had four children, all with his first wife. He died at Le Havre, France, in October 1826 aged 72.
