= Jacques Bedout =

Canadian naval officer

Jacques Bedout (French pronunciation: [ʒak bədu]; January 13, 1751, Quebec – April 17, 1818, Pauillac) was a Canadian born naval officer who had both a merchant marine and Royal Navy career in France.

He was born to parents Marie Françoise Barolet and Jean-Antoine Bedout, the latter of whom was a member of the Superior Council of Quebec and a merchant. His purported elder brother was also named Jean Antoine Bedout, born 1744.

Bedout spent 14 years in the merchant marine at the beginning of his career. He moved to France and joined the French Royal Navy in 1777 as temporary sub-lieutenant and rose to rear-admiral. He earned a reputation for bravery and excellence in naval maneuvers during the time of the American War of Independence, in which he fought alongside the Americans.

In 1795, he commanded the 74-gun Tigre at the Battle of Groix. Bedout sustained four injuries, and was taken prisoner after the capture of Tigre. At the British Parliament, Charles James Fox praised his defence of his ship, comparing him to Roman and Greek heroes.

His career advanced steadily and, in 1802, Napoleon personally gave him a five ship squadron. The flagship was the Argonaute from which he commanded his squadron until illness forced his retirement in 1803. He remained listed as active on the lists until 1816.

Bedout always received high ratings from his superiors. Records show that he was considered a first rate officer.
