= French frigate Virginie (1794) =

French Navy warship

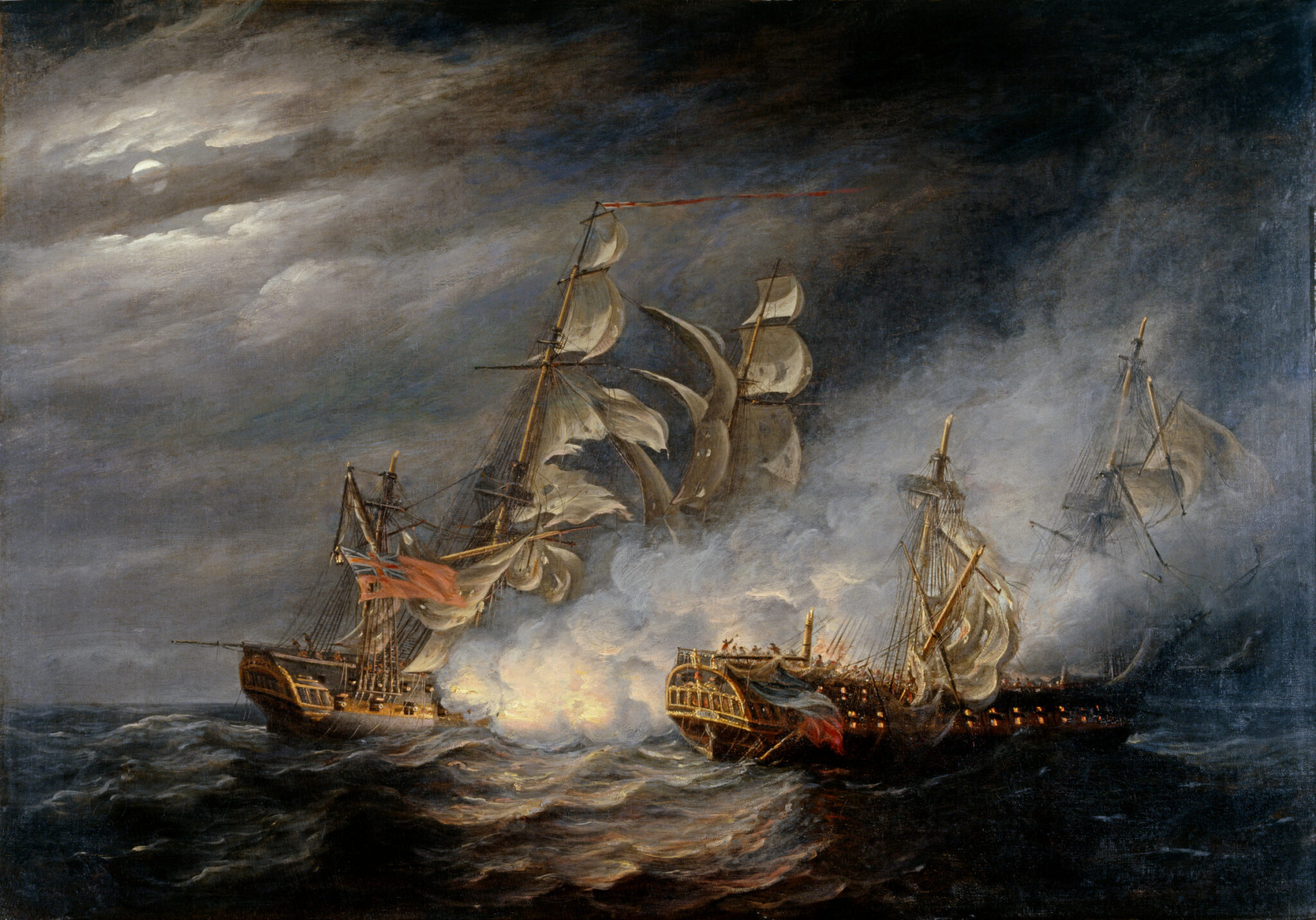
- Virginie (right) at the action of 21 April 1796

History

France
- Name: Virginie
- Ordered: 17 October 1793
- Builder: Brest
- Laid down: March 1794
- Launched: 26 July 1794
- In service: December 1794
- Captured: 22 April 1796

Great Britain
- Name: Virginie
- Acquired: 22 April 1796
- Out of service: 1827

General characteristics
- Class & type: Virginie-class frigate
- Displacement: 1,390 tonneaux
- Tons burthen: 720 port tonneaux
- Length: 47.4 m (156 ft)
- Beam: 11.9 m (39 ft)
- Draught: 5.5 m (18 ft)
- Armament: 40 guns {though pierced for 44 guns}; 28 × 18-pounders; up to 16 × 8-pounders (only 12 carried on most occasions)

Virginie was a 40-gun frigate of the French Navy, lead ship of its class.

== Career ==
=== French service ===
She took part in the Cornwallis’s Retreat and in the Battle of Groix.

On 22 April 1796, Virginie was cruising off Ireland under captain Jacques Bergeret when she encountered a British squadron under Commodore Edward Pellew, comprising the Razee 44 gun HMS Indefatigable and the frigates Argo, Concord, Révolutionnaire, Amazon and their prize Unité, captured on 13 April.

Virginie retreated and the British squadron gave chase, joining with the French frigate around 23:00. Indefatigable closed in and exchanged broadsides, without succeeding in her attempts at raking Virginie. The gunnery exchange lasted for 4 hours, until the British frigates caught up. Bergeret then struck his colours in the face of an overwhelming opponent. (Note: Britain returned Bergeret in exchange for Sir Sidney Smith, whom the French had captured. However, the Convention rejected the exchange, refusing to release Smith. Bergeret honoured his parole and returned to Plymouth on the cartel Displai, which was returning the officers from Arab.)

She was subsequently recommissioned in the Royal Navy as HMS Virginie.

=== British service ===
In January 1799, Virginie was with British squadron at the defence of Macau during the Macau Incident.

On 20 May 1808, she captured the Dutch frigate Guelderland.

In Royal Navy service the armament consisted of 46 guns:

- 8 carronades (32-pounders) on the quarterdeck and forecastle
- 28 long ordnances (18-pounders) on the main deck
- 10 long ordnances (9-pounders) on the quarterdeck and forecastle
