= Jean-Nicolas Topsent =

French naval officer and politician (1755–1816)

Jean-Nicolas Topsent (12 June 1755 - 18 August 1816) was a French naval officer and politician.

== Life ==
He was son of Jean-Baptiste Topsent and Anne Le Cerf, both of whose families had previously produced naval officers. Topsent was a surname of Danish origin.

He was a lieutenant de vaisseau in Chesapeake Bay during the American Revolutionary War, then a deputy to the National Convention and the Council of Ancients. He accompanied admiral amiral Villaret-Joyeuse at the Battle of Groix. He and Lazare Hoche both took part in the efforts to counter the 1795 émigré landing in Quiberon. As a capitaine de vaisseau he took part in the Saint-Domingue expedition before Napoleon (then First Consul) put him in command of the squadron carrying Claude-Victor Perrin's force to Louisiana.

During his time as a deputy, illness kept him away from the votes on the death of Louis XVI but he took a major part in reorganising the navy. He supported the methods applied by Jeanbon Saint-André and continued his career during the French Directory.

He died at Quillebeuf-sur-Seine. He was mentioned in the chapter on the Convention in Victor Hugo's Quatrevingt-treize.

== Bibliography ==
- (in French) « Jean-Nicolas Topsent », in Adolphe Robert and Gaston Cougny, Dictionnaire des parlementaires français, Edgar Bourloton, 1889–1891
- (in French) Claude Duchemin, Un Viking à la Convention - Chroniques du capitaine de vaisseau JN TOPSENT, éditions SPM, ISBN 978-2-901952-58-9
