= William Browell =

William Browell (1759–1831), was a captain in the Royal Navy.

== Life ==
Browell was the son of William Browell, formerly midshipman of the Centurion under Commodore Anson. He entered the Navy in 1771 on board the Merlin sloop, and, after serving on various ships, was moved shortly before the engagement off Ushant into the Victory. On 10 November 1778 he was made lieutenant, and was with Captain Macbride in the Artois at the hard-fought battle on the Dogger Bank, 5 August. 1781. In the armament of 1790 he was for a short time in the Canada, and, on that ship being paid off, was appointed to the Alcide, and in the spring of 1793 to the Leviathan. In the Leviathan he was present at the operations at the Siege of Toulon under Lord Hood. On 25 May 1794 he was officially discharged from the Leviathan on promotion; but as the ship was then with the fleet under Lord Howe, and in daily expectation of a battle, it would appear probable that he continued in her as a volunteer, and was present in the action of 1 June. On 29 November, he was posted into the Princess Augusta yacht.

In June 1795 Lord Hugh Seymour, now a rear-admiral, hoisted his flag in the Sans Pareil, and selected Browell as his flag-captain. He thus had a distinguished share in the Battle of Groix on 23 June 1795, and continued in the Sans Pareil during the next two years, including the critical time of the mutiny at Spithead. The squadron under Lord Hugh's immediate command was, however, cruising when the mutiny broke out, and did not come into port until the ships at Spithead had returned to their obedience. In June the Sans Pareil was one of a squadron under Sir Roger Curtis, sent for a few weeks into the North Sea. On its return to Spithead, and while the ship was refitting, Captain Browell, being on shore at Gosport, was severely crushed by a bale of wool falling from a height. The injury to his back was such that for some time his life was despaired of; and though, after a long illness, he partially recovered, he was never again fit for active service.

In 1805 he was appointed one of the captains of Greenwich Hospital, and in 1809 was advanced to be lieutenant-governor, a position which he held until his death, 22 July 1831.
