= French ship Wattignies (1794) =

Ship of the line of the French Navy

- Scale model of Achille, sister ship of French ship Wattignies (1794), on display at the Musée national de la Marine in Paris.

History

France
- Namesake: Battle of Wattignies (1793)
- Ordered: 3 July 1793
- Builder: Lorient shipyard
- Launched: 8 October 1794
- Stricken: 5 September 1808
- Fate: Scrapped, 21 September 1808

General characteristics
- Class & type: Téméraire-class ship of the line
- Displacement: 3,069 tonneaux
- Tons burthen: 1,537 port tonneaux
- Length: 55.87 m (183 ft 4 in)
- Beam: 14.46 m (47 ft 5 in)
- Draught: 7.15 m (23.5 ft)
- Depth of hold: 7.15 m (23 ft 5 in)
- Sail plan: Full-rigged ship
- Crew: 705
- Armament: 74 guns: Lower gun deck: 28 × 36 pdr guns; Upper gun deck: 30 × 18 pdr guns; Forecastle and Quarterdeck: 16 × 8 pdr guns

Wattignies was a 74-gun Téméraire-class ship of the line built for the French Navy during the 1790s. Completed in 1794, she played a minor role in the Napoleonic Wars.

== Description ==
Designed by Jacques-Noël Sané, the Téméraire-class ships had a length of 55.87 metres (183 ft 4 in), a beam of 14.46 metres (47 ft 5 in) and a depth of hold of 7.15 metres (23 ft 5 in). The ships displaced 3,069 tonneaux and had a mean draught of 7.15 metres (23 ft 5 in). They had a tonnage of 1,537 port tonneaux. Their crew numbered 705 officers and ratings during wartime. They were fitted with three masts and ship rigged.

The muzzle-loading, smoothbore armament of the Téméraire class consisted of twenty-eight 36-pounder long guns on the lower gun deck and thirty 18-pounder long guns on the upper gun deck. On the quarterdeck and forecastle were a total of sixteen 8-pounder long guns. Beginning with the ships completed after 1787, the armament of the Téméraires began to change with the addition of four 36-pounder obusiers on the poop deck (dunette). Some ships had instead twenty 8-pounders.

== Construction and career ==
Wattignes was laid down at the Arsenal de Lorient in May 1793 and named on 29 November. The ship was launched on 8 October 1794 and completed in December. She ferried troops and munitions to Sainte Dominigue during February–August 1796. Wattignes took part in the French expedition to Ireland at the end of 1796 under Captain Antoine René Thévenard. In July 1808, she was converted to a fluyt and was condemned on 5 September. Wattignes was broken up between 21 September 1808 and 26 April 1809.
