= Battle of Groix =

1795 battle of the War of the First Coalition

- Part of the War of the First Coalition
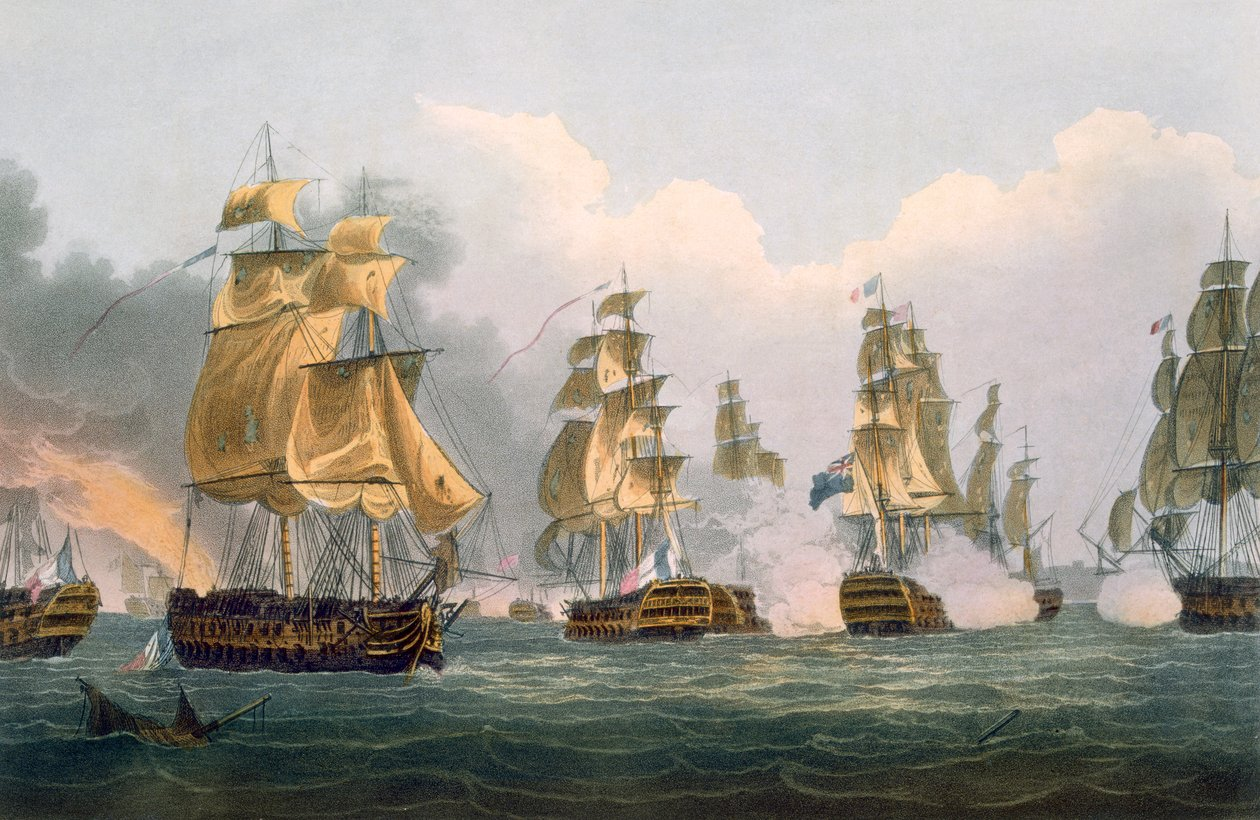
- Lord Bridport's Action off Port L'Orient, June 23rd 1795; Thomas Whitcombe, 1816
| Date | 23 June 1795 |
| Location | Off Groix, Bay of Biscay 47°36′N 3°36′W |
| Result | British victory |

Belligerents
| Great Britain | France |

Commanders and leaders
| Alexander Hood | Villaret de Joyeuse |

Strength
| 14 ships of the line (OOB) | 12 ships of the line (OOB) |

Casualties and losses
| 31 killed 113 wounded | 670 killed or wounded 3 ships of the line captured |
- Location within France

The Battle of Groix ([ɡʁwa]) took place on 23 June 1795 off the island of Groix in the Bay of Biscay during the War of the First Coalition. It was fought between elements of the British Channel Fleet and the French Atlantic Fleet, which were cruising in the region on separate missions. The British fleet, commanded by Admiral Lord Bridport, was covering an invasion convoy carrying a French Royalist army tasked with invading Quiberon, while the French fleet under Vice-admiral Villaret de Joyeuse had sailed a week earlier to rescue a convoy from being attacked by a British squadron. The French fleet had driven off the British squadron in a battle on 17 June known as Cornwallis's Retreat, and were attempting to return to their base at Brest when Bridport's force of 14 ships of the line appeared on 22 June.

Villaret, believing that the stronger British fleet would destroy his own 12 ships of the line, ordered his force to fall back to the inshore anchorage off Groix, hoping to take shelter in protected coastal waters. Several of his ships were too slow, falling behind so that early in the morning of 23 June the rearmost ships of his fleet were caught by the British vanguard, overhauled one by one and brought to battle. Although Villaret fought a determined rearguard action, three French ships were captured, all with very heavy casualties, and the remainder of the French fleet was left scattered along the coastline. In this position they were highly vulnerable to continued British attack, but after only a few hours' engagement, concerned that his ships might be wrecked on the rocky coastline, Bridport called off the action and allowed Villaret to regroup inshore and retreat to Lorient.

Although the battle was a British victory, there was criticism of Bridport's rapid withdrawal. British historians have subsequently considered that a unique opportunity to destroy the French Atlantic fleet had been lost. The invasion at Quiberon ended in disaster a month later, although Bridport remained at sea in the region until September. The French fleet by contrast was trapped in the port of Lorient where food supplies ran out, forcing Villaret to discharge many of his ships' crews. As a result, most ships did not return to Brest until the winter and were consequently unable to threaten British control of the French coastline for the remainder of the year. Several French captains were court-martialled following the battle, with two dismissed for ignoring orders.

== Background ==
The first two years of the French Revolutionary Wars had seen the French Atlantic Fleet, based principally at the Breton harbour of Brest, suffer a series of setbacks. The tense atmosphere in France following the French Revolution was reflected in the fleet, which suffered a mutiny in September 1793 followed by a purge of suspected anti-republicans which resulted in the death or imprisonment of a number of experienced commanders. In May 1794, the French fleet sallied into the Atlantic to protect an incoming grain convoy from the United States and was attacked by the British Channel Fleet at the battle of the Glorious First of June, losing seven ships, although the convoy was saved. In the winter of 1794–1795, five more French ships were lost in a disastrous sortie in the middle of the Atlantic winter storm season known as the Croisière du Grand Hiver. By the spring of 1795, the British Channel Fleet was in the ascendancy, enforcing a distant blockade of the French fleet in Brest.

In May 1795, with much of the winter's damage repaired, the French commander Vice-amiral Villaret de Joyeuse sent a squadron of three ships of the line and several frigates under Counter-admiral Jean Gaspard Vence to Bordeaux with orders to escort a convoy of merchant ships carrying wine and brandy to Brest. On 8 June, as Vence's convoy passed the fortified island of Belle Île on the southern Breton coast they were discovered by a British battle squadron of five ships of the line and two frigates under Vice-admiral William Cornwallis. Vence ordered his outnumbered ships to shelter under the batteries of Belle Île, and after a brief skirmish Cornwallis withdrew his forces with eight captured merchant ships. While Cornwallis was escorting his prizes to the mouth of the Channel, Vence sailed out of the Belle Île anchorage and discovered on 15 June that the main force of the Atlantic fleet had sailed to rescue him, a mission ordered by government over the objections of the fleet's officers that Vence would be able to easily extricate himself from the anchorage due to the proximity of the port of Lorient.

On the morning of 16 June Cornwallis returned to the region, hunting for Vence, and instead discovered Villaret de Joyeuse with an overwhelming force. This time Cornwallis was forced to retreat, heading into open water with the French fleet in pursuit. Cornwallis was hampered by the poor sailing of two of his squadron, and on the morning of 17 June the leading French ships were close enough to open fire on his rearguard. Throughout the day the French vanguard kept up a distant but continual fire on the rearmost British ship HMS Mars, until eventually the ship began to fall behind. In an effort to protect Mars, Cornwallis interposed his 100-gun flagship HMS Royal Sovereign between the British squadron and the French force, its massive broadsides driving the French back. At the same time, Cornwallis had ordered the frigate HMS Phaeton to range ahead of his squadron making false signals announcing the imminent arrival of a British fleet. These signals, in combination with the coincidental appearance of unidentified sails to the north, caused Villaret to become so concerned that at 18:40 he called off pursuit and returned to the French coast, allowing Cornwallis to return to Britain without further incident. The engagement was subsequently known as Cornwallis's Retreat.

Unbeknownst to either Villaret or Cornwallis, the British Channel Fleet was also at sea, having sailed from Spithead on 12 June with 14 ships of the line and 11 smaller vessels under the command of Admiral Alexander Hood, 1st Viscount Bridport. Bridport had been tasked with ensuring the safety of a convoy of transports, commanded by Commodore Sir John Borlase Warren, which carried a French Royalist army to Quiberon with the intention of triggering a counter-revolution in Brittany. This force consisted of an additional three ships of the line, six frigates and more than 50 transports containing 2,500 French Royalists. The voyage across the English Channel and around the Ushant headland took seven days, the combined fleet and expeditionary force arriving off Belle Île on 19 June. Bridport had ordered Warren to take his convoy on to Quiberon while the main body of the Channel Fleet stood further out to sea to intercept any attack by the French Atlantic Fleet, which Bridport assumed would advance southwards from Brest. What the British admiral did not know was that not only had the French fleet sailed a week earlier, they were still at sea – Villaret's ships having been blown southwards by a severe gale on 18 June and forced to take shelter in the anchorage off Belle Île.

== Engagement off Groix ==
=== Villaret's retreat ===
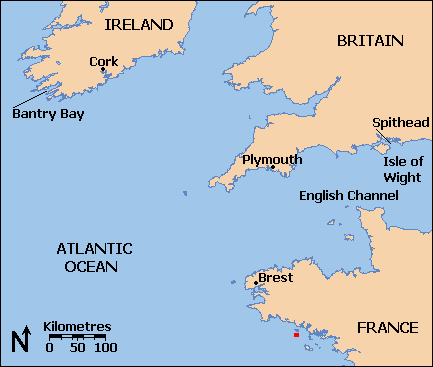
Villaret retreated to near the island of Groix, indicated by the red dot, off the coast of France southeast of Brest.

It was one of Warren's ships, the frigate HMS Arethusa, which first discovered the French as Villaret led his fleet out from the sheltered anchorage. Lookouts on Arethusa miscounted the French fleet, identifying 16 ships of the line and ten frigates; Warren immediately sent word to Bridport while ordering his convoy to turn away from the French. Villaret did not pursue Warren's force: he may not have gauged its true strength correctly, and his ships were running low on provisions having taken aboard only enough for 15 days in their haste to leave Brest a week earlier. On the morning of 20 June, Warren's force sighted Bridport's fleet to the south-east, the admiral sending orders to Warren to detach his three ships of the line to bolster Bridport's fleet in the face of the supposedly more numerous French force. Without waiting for these reinforcements, Bridport sailed back towards the coast against the wind, seeking to place his fleet between the Quiberon expedition and Villaret's ships.

The adverse southeasterly winds frustrated both fleets, and it was not until 03:30 on 22 June that lookouts on Bridport's scouting frigates HMS Nymphe and HMS Astrea finally discovered the French in the distance to the southeast, the British approximately 42 nautical miles (78 km) from the French coast. On seeing the larger British fleet, to which Warren's detached ships had still not joined, Villaret ordered his fleet to turn back towards the land and Bridport followed, seeing that the French admiral did not intend to offer battle. To maximise his chances of catching the French, Bridport specifically ordered his "best-sailing" ships HMS Sans Pareil, HMS Orion, HMS Colossus, HMS Irresistible, HMS Valiant and HMS Russell, to break from the formation and lead the pursuit at 06:30. Bridport followed in his 100-gun first rate flagship HMS Royal George, accompanied by the remainder of the fleet, which included another 100-gun ship HMS Queen Charlotte and seven 98-gun second rate ships.

All day the chase continued: at 12:00 the French fleet were approximately 12 nautical miles (22 km) distant, and all through the afternoon the British ships slowly gained on their opponents, both sides hampered by long periods of calm weather. To ensure that his fleet was in a position to intercept the French whichever tack they took, Bridport split his fleet across a wide front, clustered in two trailing groups. At 19:00, Bridport signaled for his ships to attack the rearmost French vessels, and at 19:25 to attack French ships as and when they overhauled them, taking up mutually supportive positions. At 22:30 a calm fell, arresting both fleets until 03:00 on 23 June, when a light breeze from the south-west was enough to allow Bridport's fleet to push onwards so that as dawn rose the French were dead ahead. The main body of the French fleet was sailing in a loose cluster with three or four ships trailing behind and one ship, Alexandre under Captain François Charles Guillemet far to the rear and only 3 nautical miles (5.6 km) from the British vanguard. Alexandre had been a British ship until November 1794, when she had been captured in a sharp engagement with a French squadron in which the ship had been badly damaged. The ship was a poor sailer, and its position was worsened by poor handling by Guillemet who did not follow Villaret's orders to form a line of battle rapidly enough.

Against expectation, Bridport's leading ship was Queen Charlotte, which had attained an unusually fast speed for a first rate through the carefully planned sailing of Captain Sir Andrew Snape Douglas. Immediately behind Douglas was Captain Richard Grindall in Irresistible, with Orion, Colossus, Sans Pareil and Russell a short distance behind the leaders and the rest of the fleet substantially to the rear. At 04:00, the island of Groix lay approximately 8 nautical miles (15 km) to the east of Queen Charlotte, the French coastline behind it. It was to this region that Villaret was retreating, hoping Bridport would be reluctant to follow him into the confined waters around the well-fortified island, which lies on the entrance to the port of Lorient. The southern Breton coast was a notoriously dangerous region, where Atlantic gales could push ships towards poorly charted reefs and rocky outcrops.

=== 23 June ===
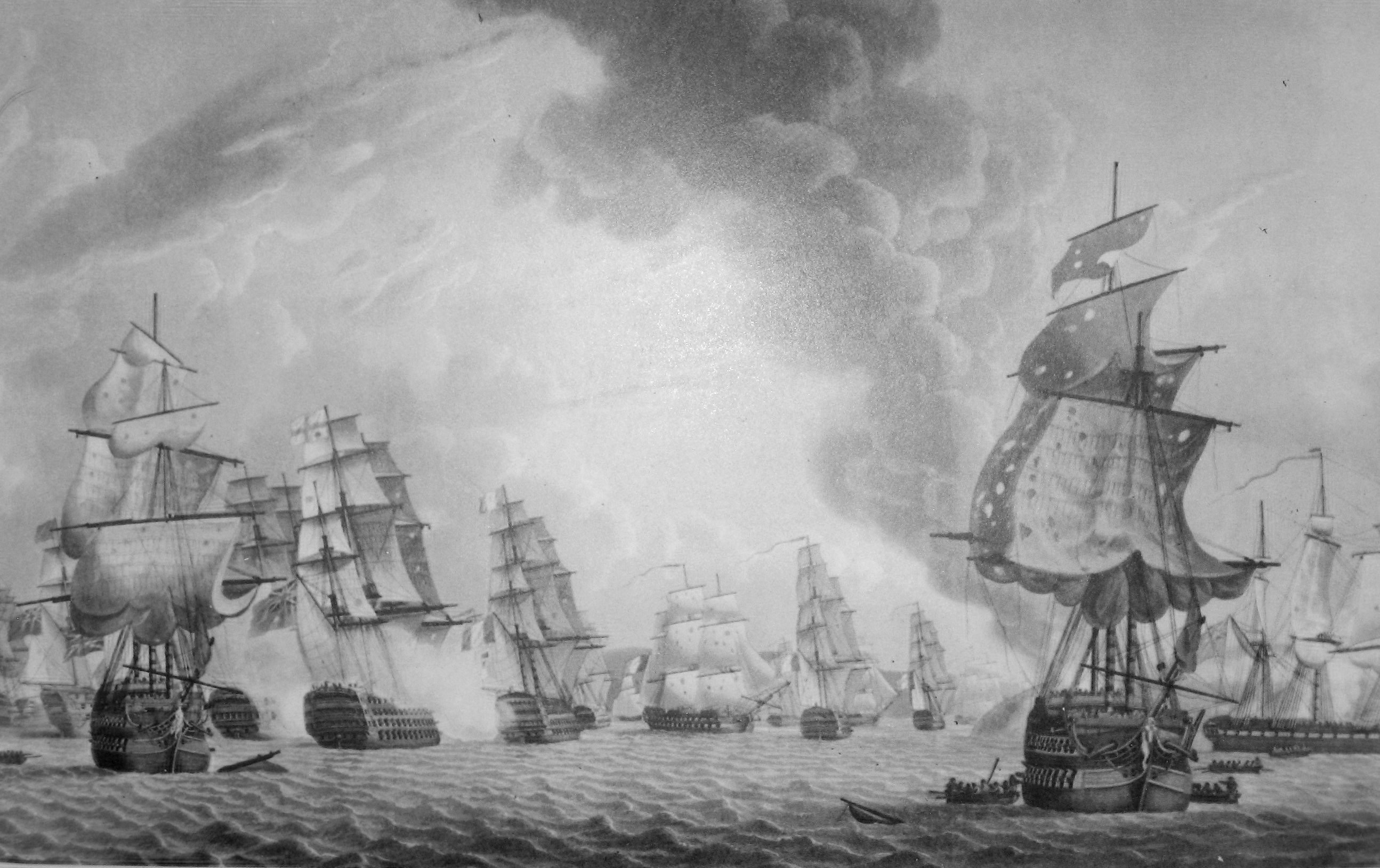
View of the Close of the Action Between the British and French Fleets, off Port L'Orient on 23 June 1795 (Robert Dodd, 1812)

With Alexandre now in danger of becoming isolated, Villaret sent the frigate Régénérée to take the lumbering vessel under tow at 05:00. Just under an hour later, Douglas brought Queen Charlotte within range, Guillemet firing his stern-chasers at his three-decked opponent. Douglas responded with his bow-chasers, gradually bringing his main battery into range and joined by Captain Sir James Saumarez in Orion, which opened fire shortly after 06:00. The frigate captain, aware that his ship was powerless against two such opponents, abandoned the tow and sped ahead to rejoin the French fleet. Villaret's force had once more divided, with Formidable under Captain Charles Linois a little way ahead of Alexandre and Villaret in his 120-gun flagship Peuple ahead of Formidable. With the French admiral were Redoutable, Mucius, Wattignies, Tigre and Vence's flagship Nestor, while the remainder of the fleet had pushed on ahead and were now substantially advanced. Villaret sent signals to form a tight line of battle, and all French ships repeated the signal, but none executed the manoeuvre.

At 06:15, Queen Charlotte passed Alexandre and began firing on Formidable, Linois returning fire against his much larger enemy for fifteen minutes before a fire broke out on the poop deck. As the French crew scrambled to extinguish it, Sans Pareil, flagship of Rear-Admiral Lord Hugh Seymour, reached the ship and fired a broadside in passing, causing Formidable to lose speed and fall further back from the main body of the French. The fire from Queen Charlotte had reduced Linois's ship to a wreck, with the rigging torn and more than 320 men killed or wounded from a crew of 717. As Sans Pareil passed ahead of the battered ship, the mizzenmast on Formidable collapsed over the side and Linois, seeing the rest of the British fleet rapidly approaching, struck his colours and surrendered. As Sans Pareil and Queen Charlotte battled Formidable, Colossus and Russell, joined by the second rates HMS London and HMS Queen, pushed on to the French centre where Villaret's ships were awaiting them, the French admiral repeatedly attempting to form his ships into a line of battle to receive the British attack, without success.

At 07:00, four British ships and six French fought a confused melee while the French vanguard continued eastwards without pause and the slower portions of the British fleet struggled to come up in the light winds. The entire combat was slowly pulling closer to the fortified rocky island of Groix, close to which Villaret intended to shelter his fleet. Douglas in Queen Charlotte had been forced out of the engagement due to severe damage to his rigging and sails which made his ship unmanageable. At 07:14, he drifted past the shattered hull of Alexandre; Captain Guillemet opened fire briefly before surrendering as Douglas returned it with devastating effect. Even as his ship fell back, Douglas continued to engage the French at long range, turning the guns on Peuple and Tigre, joined by Sans Pareil which attacked Tigre under Captain Jacques Bedout and forced it out of the French formation with severe damage. Villaret again attempted to gather his forces in support of Tigre, and even positioned his frigate ahead of his own fleeing ships in hope of cutting off their retreat and forcing them to imitate his own manoeuvres, but in vain; "they would have passed over my very body had not representant Topsent taken command and prevented a collision", he wrote in his report. As Tigre fell out of line, Queen and London joined the attack on the isolated ship, and Bedout was forced to surrender in the face of overwhelming odds. The French ship had been severely damaged, with 8 feet (2.4 m) of water in the hold, the masts and rigging badly torn and more than 130 men killed or wounded, including Bedout, who had been hit three times.

At 07:57, Bridport's Royal George reached the combat, Douglas falling in behind his ship in anticipation of a renewed attack, the crew of Queen Charlotte having conducted enough hasty repairs to regain control of their ship. At 08:15 Bridport signaled Colossus under Captain John Monkton, the leading British ship more than 1.5 nautical miles (2.8 km) ahead of the flagship, to return to the fleet. He repeated the order to Seymour in Sans Pareil who was almost as far advanced in combat with the retreating Peuple, on which Villaret's flag captain Jacques Angot had been killed in action. Bridport then pulled ahead in the pursuit, catching the badly damaged Peuple approximately 0.5 nautical miles (0.93 km) west of Groix and firing one broadside at the French flagship and another at Tigre, which Bridport was not aware had already surrendered. At 08:37, ignoring the nearby Peuple and the remainder of the French fleet scattered between Groix and the River Laïta, Bridport turned away to the south-west followed by the British fleet.

== Aftermath ==
Bridport gave instructions as he withdrew for Alexandre, Formidable and Tigre to be taken under tow by HMS Prince, HMS Barfleur and HMS Prince George respectively. The British fleet was in good condition: five ships had seen no action at all and of those that had fought, only Queen Charlotte had suffered any significant damage, principally to her rigging. The British fleet had lost 31 men killed and 113 wounded; Queen Charlotte and Colossus had the heaviest casualties of 36 and 35 respectively. Bridport placed prize crews on the captured vessels and sent them back to Britain while turning the fleet back eastwards once it had reached a safe distance from the coast, in order to provide support for Warren's expedition to Quiberon. Warren landed the French Royalist forces at Carnac on 27 June, but the invasion ended in disaster a month later, the surviving Royalists driven back to the coast and collected by Warren. Bridport had remained off Quiberon to ensure that Villaret did not return to harass the expeditionary force, returning to Britain on 20 September but leaving the bulk of the blockade fleet off the Breton coast under Rear-Admiral Henry Harvey. The 68-year-old Bridport was forcibly retired in October after an unrelated argument with First Lord of the Admiralty Earl Spencer, but was reinstated in 1796 and continued to serve in command of the Channel Fleet until 1800.

Villaret meanwhile gathered his scattered ships and called a council of his senior officers on the frigate Proserpine to discuss their next course of action. The French admiral believed Bridport had only temporarily withdrawn and would be soon returning to continue the engagement. He therefore proposed to anchor off the Breton coast in a strong defensive position and await Bridport's attack. This scheme was vociferously opposed by Counter-admirals Yves-Joseph de Kerguelen-Trémarec and Étienne Eustache Bruix, who argued that in such a position the British would be able to use the weather gage to bombard the French at will and attack them with fire ships. Following their advice, Villaret decided to shelter the fleet in the nearby port of Lorient to seek supplies and repairs before returning to Brest. But he found that, having sailed without sufficient provisions, Lorient was not equipped for a fleet of such size and Villaret was forced to discharge the majority of sailors as he was unable to feed them. It was not until December and the winter storm season that a number of the ships were able to travel quietly up the coast to Brest, while others were sent southwards to Rochefort. French casualties had been heavy, although they have not been reported other than on the captured vessels, which totaled 670 killed and wounded. In the aftermath of the action, Villaret wrote a letter condemning the behaviour of a number of his officers, stating "Soit ignorance, soit ineptie, soit insubordination, malgré nos signaux réitérés, des ordres transmis par porte-voix, rien ne fut fait. Nos boulets atterissaient dans l'eau, le patriotisme à lui seul ne peut manoeuvrer un navire" ("Be it ignorance, ineptitude or insubordination, in spite of our repeated signals, nothing was done. Our shots landed in water, patriotism alone cannot manoeuvre a ship"). Several French captains were court-martialled: Jean Magnac of Zélé, already blamed for the failure at Cornwallis's Retreat, was dismissed from the Navy, as was Captain Giot-Labrière of Fougueux. Captain Larréguy of Mucius was censured for not adequately supporting Tigre, and three other captains were tried but acquitted.

In common with the battle of the Glorious First of June the previous year, rewards for the British victory at Groix were unevenly distributed. Bridport's dispatch to the Admiralty was short and lacking in detail; the only officer commended was Bridport's own flag captain William Domett, whose ship had joined the action only in the last stages. The situation was worsened by the Parliament of Great Britain, which voted thanks for the battle but specifically named only Bridport, Lord Hugh Seymour and Vice-Admiral Sir Alan Gardner of Queen. This omitted not only the numerous captains who had taken part in the battle, but also Vice-Admiral John Colpoys of London, whose ship had been much more heavily engaged than Gardner's. Numerous historians have commented on these unexplained omissions, William James noting that Douglas and Queen Charlotte were particularly unfortunate in this regard as the admiral normally aboard, Rear-Admiral Sir Roger Curtis, was ashore at the court-martial of Captain Anthony Molloy and consequently the ship received no recognition despite being the most heavily engaged of any in the British fleet.

All three captured ships were taken into the Royal Navy. The name of Alexandre reverted to the former Alexander, and although James suggests that the ship was never again fit for frontline service, this claim is refuted by Alexander's presence in the line at the Battle of the Nile in 1798 under Captain Alexander Ball. Tigre retained her French name, while Formidable, as there was already a ship by that name in the Royal Navy, became HMS Belleisle, apparently due to confusion between the islands of Groix and Belle Île in the aftermath of the battle. Belleisle had a long and successful career, fighting at the Battle of Trafalgar in 1805 under Captain William Hargood.

More controversial than the distribution of commendations was the debate over Bridport's decision to withdraw from the battle while the remainder of the French fleet was still within reach. In his official dispatch, the British admiral wrote that "If the Enemy had not been protected and sheltered by the Land, I have every reason to believe that a much greater Number, if not all the Line of Battle ships, would have been taken or destroyed", going on note that "When the ships struck, the British squadron was near to some Batteries [on Groix], and in the Face of a strong Naval Port [Lorient]. His subsequent concern for the Quiberon expeditionary convoy also demonstrates that he considered its protection his principal duty. But in the opinion of French admiral Kerguelen, "S'ils avaient bien manouevré, ils auraient pu, ou prendre tous nos vaisseaux, ou les faire périr à la côte" (If [the English] had manoeuvred successfully they could have taken all our vessels, or made them perish on the coast). Historians have considered this view and most agree that Bridport's retirement was premature: In 1827 James noted that the scattered remains of the French fleet could easily have been attacked by the unengaged British rear with the advantage of the weather gage, while William Laird Clowes wrote in 1901 that "We may be pretty sure that had a Nelson, a Hawke or even a Boscawen commanded on the occasion, the fleet of Villaret would have been annihilated." Twenty-first-century historians Noel Mostert and Richard Woodman have compared Groix with the battles of Genoa and Hyères fought during the year in the Mediterranean, where in similar circumstances another elderly admiral, William Hotham, had also allowed scattered and retreating French fleets to escape when they might have been destroyed.

== Bibliography ==
- Allen, Joseph (1905) [1842]. Battles of the British Navy (9th ed.). London: Simpkin, Marshall, Hamilton, Kent & Co. OCLC 85994488.
- Brenton, Edward Pelham (1837) [1825]. The Naval History of Great Britain, Vol. I. London: C. Rice. "edward pelham brenton."
- Chasseriau, F. (1845). Précis historique de la marine française, son organisation et ses lois. Impr. Royale. pp. 234–245. OCLC 613294580.
- Clowes, William Laird (1997) [1900]. The Royal Navy, A History from the Earliest Times to 1900, Volume IV. London: Chatham Publishing. ISBN 1-86176-013-2.
- Gardiner, Robert, ed. (2001) [1996]. Fleet Battle and Blockade. Caxton Editions. ISBN 978-1-84067-363-0.
- Gardiner, Robert, ed. (2001) [1998]. The Campaign of Trafalgar. Caxton Editions. ISBN 1-84067-358-3.
- Granier, Hubert (1998). Histoire des Marins français 1789–1815. Marines éditions. ISBN 2-909675-41-6.
- James, William (2002) [1827]. The Naval History of Great Britain, Volume 1, 1793–1796. London: Conway Maritime Press. ISBN 0-85177-905-0.
- Ladimir, F.; Moreau, E. (1856). "Tome 5". Campagnes, thriomphes, revers, désastres et guerres civiles des Français de 1792 à la paix de 1856. Librairie Populaire des Villes et des Campagnes. p. 40.
- Lecomte, Jules (1836). Chroniques de la marine française: de 1789 à 1830, d'après les documents officiels, Tome 1. H. Souverain. pp. 268–271.
- Mostert, Noel (2007). The Line upon a Wind: The Greatest War Fought at Sea Under Sail 1793–1815. Vintage Books. ISBN 978-0-7126-0927-2.
- Rouvier, Charles (1868). "Crosière dans l'océan". Histoire des marins français sous la République, de 1789 à 1803. Paris: Librairie Maritime at Scientifique. OCLC 254050320.
- Willis, Sam (2011). The Glorious First of June. Quercus. ISBN 978-1-84916-039-1.
- Winfield, Rif (2008). British Warships in the Age of Sail 1793–1817: Design, Construction, Careers and Fates. London: Seaforth. ISBN 978-1-86176-246-7.
- Woodman, Richard (2001). The Sea Warriors. Constable Publishers. ISBN 1-84119-183-3.
