= Thomas Williams (Royal Navy officer) =

Royal Navy Admiral (c. 1761/62–1841)

Admiral Sir Thomas Williams GCB
- Born: 1761 or 1762
- Died: 8 October 1841; Burwood House, Weybridge, Surrey
- Military career
- Allegiance: United Kingdom
- Branch: Royal Navy
- Service years: 1768 to 1814
- Rank: Admiral
- Commands: Nore Command; Portsmouth Command
- Conflicts: American Revolutionary War; Battle of Sullivan's Island; Battle of St. Lucia; Battle of Grenada; Battle of Cape Henry; French Revolutionary Wars; Action of 8 June 1796; Napoleonic Wars
- Awards: Knight Bachelor, Knight Grand Cross of the Order of the Bath

Admiral Sir Thomas Williams GCB (1761 or 1762 – 8 October 1841) was a senior British Royal Navy officer of the late eighteenth and early nineteenth centuries, who served in numerous theatres during the American Revolutionary War, French Revolutionary Wars and Napoleonic Wars. As a young officer he fought at a number of battles in the Caribbean and as a frigate captain he was knighted for his actions at the action of 8 June 1796 in which two French frigates were captured without a single man killed or wounded on Williams' ship HMS Unicorn. Later in his career, Williams commanded squadrons blockading the European coast and assisting the supply of the British Army during the Peninsula War.

== Life ==
Williams was born in 1761 or 1762, the son of Naval Captain William Williams. Aged only 7, Thomas Williams was entered as a servant on his father's ship HMS Peggy, although it is likely that he did not spend much time aboard. He is reported to have followed his father through various commands (although many of these commissions were on paper only) until 1776, when he was certainly present at the Battle of Sullivan's Island, aboard the brig HMS Active. The following year he moved to HMS Prince of Wales, flagship of Rear-Admiral Samuel Barrington in the Caribbean. Prince of Wales was subsequently engaged at the Battle of St. Lucia in 1778 and the Battle of Grenada in 1779. Having gained the requisite seniority, Williams was promoted to lieutenant in December 1779 and served on HMS America, part of the fleet that captured a Spanish convoy from Caracas in 1780. Returning briefly to Britain, Williams returned to the Americas the following year with Vice-Admiral Marriott Arbuthnot and fought at the Battle of Cape Henry.

The same year, Williams became first lieutenant and temporary commander of the frigate HMS Assurance, becoming a commander in 1783 in charge of HMS Rhinoceros. In reserve from 1784, Williams returned to service in command of HMS Otter in 1789, becoming a post captain in November 1790 and taking command of the frigate HMS Lizard, followed shortly afterwards by HMS Daedalus. Operating in the North Sea, Williams was commended with his service during the winter of 1794 and moved to HMS Unicorn, operating from Cork in Ireland. In June 1796, Unicorn and another frigate encountered two French frigates: the French ships divided and the British ships followed them, Unicorn chasing and engaging the Tribune. After a running fight, Tribune was captured, Williams achieving his victory without a single casualty. For his services in the action, Williams was knighted by King George III. During the winter of 1796, Unicorn formed part the squadron operating against the French Expédition d'Irlande and was present at the capture of the transport Ville de Lorient.

In March 1797, Williams became commander of the new frigate HMS Endymion and in October joined the North Sea fleet with orders to pursue the scattered Dutch ships in the aftermath of the Battle of Camperdown. With hours, Endymion encountered the ship of the line Brutus close inshore, but the protected anchorage prevented Williams from successfully attacking the Dutch ship and she was able to escape. For the next three years, Williams was employed off Ireland and on convoy to the island of St Helena. In 1801, Williams took command of the 74-gun third-rate ship of the line HMS Vanguard and operated in the Baltic Sea and off Cádiz. In 1804 he moved to HMS Neptune and in 1805 commanded a unit of Sea Fencibles at Gosport, returning to Neptune in 1807. In 1809, Williams was promoted to rear-admiral and sailed in HMS Venerable and HMS Hannibal in the Channel Fleet and then at Lisbon. In 1811 he returned to Britain and took command of HMS Royal George and became Commander-in-Chief, The Nore. He remained in that position until 1814, retiring as a vice-admiral and establishing the Naval Female School as his final act, donating £1,000 to the school's endowment (the equivalent of £68,900 as of 2025).

In his personal life, Williams was married three times. First he married in 1792 Jane Cooper, who died in a carriage accident in 1798 on the Isle of Wight. (Jane Cooper was a cousin of the novelist Jane Austen). In 1800 he married secondly a Miss Whapshare, who died in 1824. He married thirdly in April 1825 Mary Anne Mallory. It is said he remarried as he had had such a happy first marriage.

During his retirement, Williams lived at Burwood House near Weybridge, Surrey and was promoted to admiral and advanced to a Knight Grand Cross of the Order of the Bath. He held the post of Commander-in-Chief, Portsmouth from 1833 to 1836 and died in October 1841.

== Notes ==
Military offices
Preceded by Sir Henry Stanhope	Commander-in-Chief, The Nore; 1811–1814	Succeeded by Sir Charles Rowley
Preceded by Sir Thomas Foley	Commander-in-Chief, Portsmouth; 1833–1836	Succeeded by Sir Philip Durham
