= Atlantic raid of June 1796 =

Campaign in the French Revolutionary Wars

- Part of the French Revolutionary Wars
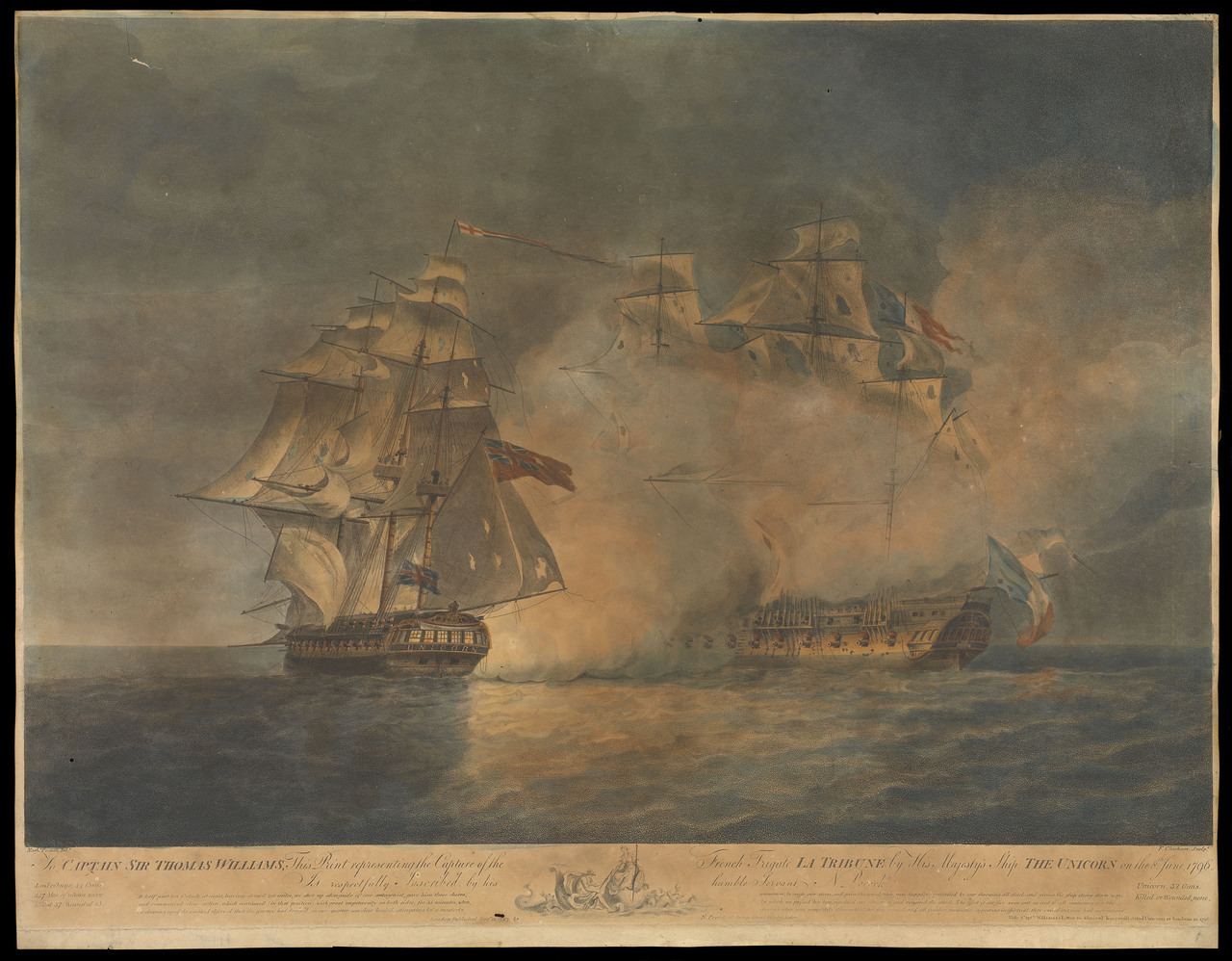
- Capture of the French Frigate Tribune by His Majesty's Ship Unicorn on the 8th June 1796; Nicholas Pocock, 1797
Date	4–22 June 1796
Location	Western Approaches, Atlantic Ocean
Result	British victory

Belligerents
Great Britain	France

Commanders and leaders
Thomas Williams	Jean Moulston

Strength
3 frigates	3 frigates 1 corvette

Casualties and losses
4 killed 10 wounded	99 killed 79 wounded 3 frigates captured 1 corvette captured

The Atlantic raid of June 1796 was a short campaign containing three connected minor naval engagements fought in the Western Approaches comprising Royal Navy efforts to eliminate a squadron of French frigates operating against British commerce during the French Revolutionary Wars. Although Royal Navy dominance in the Western Atlantic had been established, French commerce raiders operating on short cruises were having a damaging effect on British trade, and British frigate squadrons regularly patrolled from Cork in search of the raiders. One such squadron comprised the 36-gun frigates HMS Unicorn and HMS Santa Margarita, patrolling in the vicinity of the Scilly Isles, which encountered a French squadron comprising the frigates Tribune and Tamise and the corvette Légėre.

The opposing forces were approximately equal in size, but the French, under orders to operate against commerce, not engage British warships, attempted to retreat. The British frigates pursued closely and over the course of the day gradually overhauled the French squadron. At 16:00 Santa Margarita caught Tamise and a furious duel ensued in which the smaller Tamise was badly damaged and eventually forced to surrender. Tribune continued its efforts to escape, but was finally caught by Unicorn at 22:30 and defeated in a second hard-fought engagement. Légėre took no part in the action and was able to withdraw without becoming embroiled in either conflict.

Five days later the French frigate Proserpine, which had separated from the rest of the squadron after leaving Brest, was searching for her compatriots off Cape Clear in Southern Ireland when she was discovered by the patrolling British frigate HMS Dryad. Dryad successfully chased down Proserpine and forced the French ship to surrender in an engagement lasting 45 minutes. Nine days later Légėre was captured without a fight by another British frigate patrol. French casualties in all three engagements were very heavy, while British losses were light. In the aftermath all four captured ships were purchased for service in the Royal Navy.

== Background ==
The first three years of the War of the First Coalition between Great Britain and France, which began in 1793, had resulted in a series of setbacks for the French Atlantic Fleet, based at the large fortified port of Brest. In 1794 seven French ships of the line had been lost at the battle of the Glorious First of June, and early the following year five more were wrecked by winter storms during the disastrous Croisière du Grand Hiver. In June 1795 three more ships were captured by the British Channel Fleet at the Battle of Groix. With the French fleet consolidating at Brest, the Royal Navy instituted a policy of close blockade, maintaining a fleet off the port to intercept any efforts by the main French battle fleet to sail. The French Navy instead embarked on a strategy of interference with British commerce, the majority of which by necessity passed through the Western Approaches and the English Channel. This campaign was conducted principally by privateers and small squadrons of frigates operating from Brest and other smaller ports on the French Atlantic and Channel coasts.

The French commerce raiding operations had some success against British trade, and to counteract these attacks the Royal Navy formed squadrons of fast frigates, which patrolled the Channel and Bay of Biscay in search of the French warships. This resulted in a series of engagements between British and French frigate squadrons, including a notable battle on 23 April 1794, and two actions by a squadron under the command of Commodore Sir Edward Pellew on 13 April and 20 April 1796 fought in the mouth of the Channel. The southern coast of Ireland, in the Kingdom of Ireland, a British client state, was seen as a particularly vulnerable region due to its proximity to the trade routes and its numerous isolated anchorages in which French ships could shelter. To counteract this threat, a Royal Navy frigate squadron was stationed in Cork under the command of Rear-Admiral Robert Kingsmill. Ships from this squadron patrolled the mouth of the Channel, singly or in pairs, in search of French raiders.

On 4 June 1796, a French squadron was dispatched from Brest on a raiding cruise. This force included the 40-gun frigates Tribune under Franco-American Commodore Jean Moulston, Proserpine under Captain Etienne Pevrieux and Tamise under Captain Jean-Baptiste-Alexis Fradin, the latter formerly a Royal Navy ship named HMS Thames which had been captured in an engagement in the Bay of Biscay by a French frigate squadron in October 1793. With the frigates was the 18-gun corvette Légėre under Lieutenant Jean Michel-Martin Carpentier. Tamise in particular had proven a highly effective commerce raider, recorded as capturing twenty merchant ships since her enforced change of allegiance. Proserpine separated from the other ships during a period of heavy fog on 7 June, sailing independently to the rendezvous off Cape Clear in Southern Ireland.

== Tamise and Tribune ==
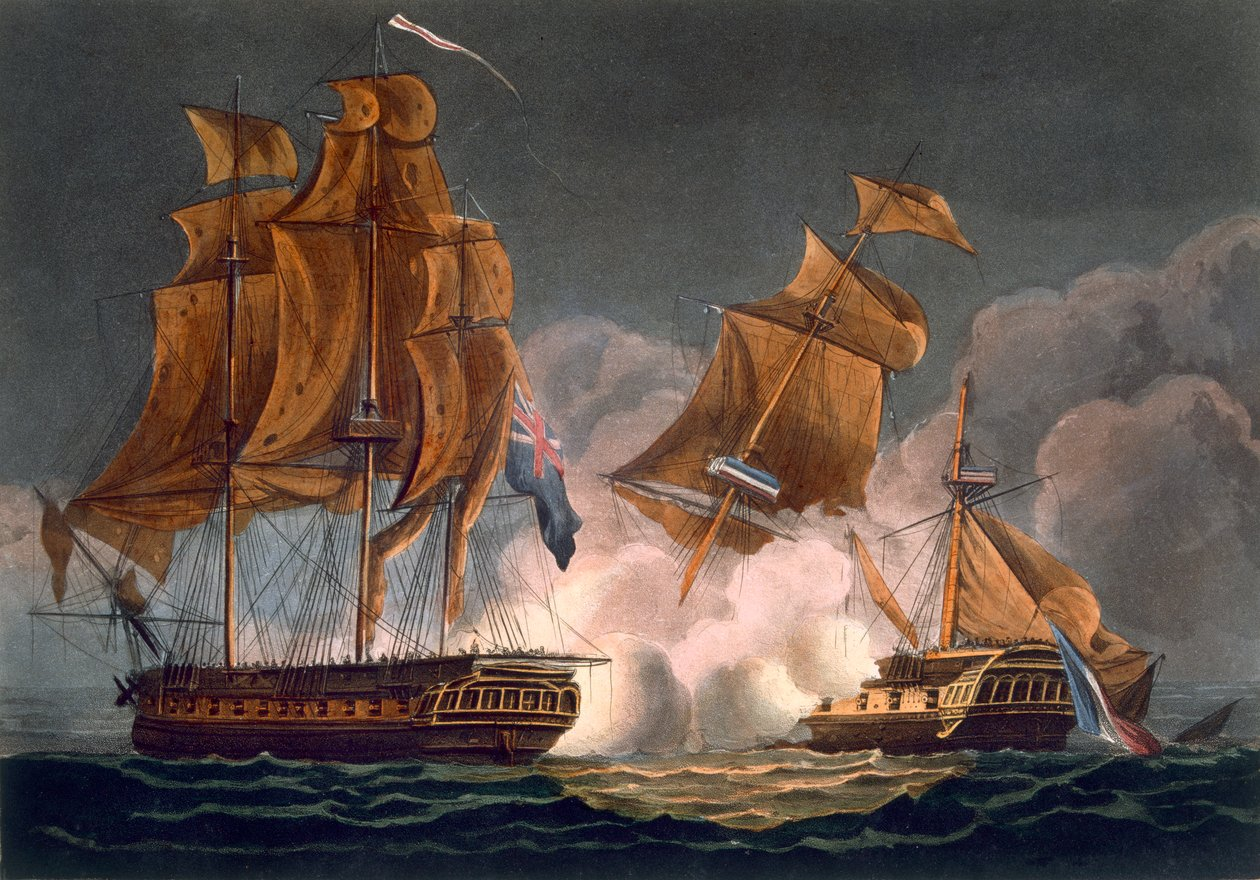
1816 illustration of Unicorn (left) capturing Tribune (right) by Thomas Whitcombe

At 02:00 in the morning of 8 June, the remaining ships of the French squadron were sailing approximately 54 nautical miles (100 km) southeast of the Scilly Isles when sails were sighted 3 nautical miles (5.6 km) distant. This was a small British frigate squadron from Kingsmill's command comprising the 36-gun HMS Unicorn under Captain Thomas Williams and HMS Santa Margarita under Captain Thomas Byam Martin, sent to patrol the area in search of French raiders. The British frigates had just seized a Swedish merchant ship carrying Dutch contraband from Surinam, which they sent to Cork under a prize crew and immediately set sail to intercept the French, who turned away, sailing in line ahead. Tribune led the line, a much faster ship than either of her consorts, holding back for mutual support, but as the morning passed and the British ships drew closer and closer Légėre fell out of the line to windward. Both British frigates passed the corvette at distance, although the smaller vessel remained in sight for sometime, eventually departing to attack a merchant sloop sailing nearby.

At 13:00 the British frigates were close enough that both Tamise and Tribune could open fire with their stern-chasers, inflicting considerable damage to the sails and rigging of the British ships and causing them to fall back despite occasional fire from the British bow-chasers. This tactic bought the French frigates three hours, but at 16:00 it became clear that the slower Tamise would be overhauled by Santa Margarita; Williams had already instructed Martin to focus on Tamise as he intended to attack the larger Tribune himself. Under fire from Martin's ship and wishing to both avoid this conflict and hoping to inflict severe damage on Santa Margarita, Fradin turned away from the former and across the bows of the latter, intending to rake Santa Margarita. In response Martin brought his frigate alongside Tamise. Running at speed away from their compatriots, Tamise and Santa Margarita exchanged broadsides for 20 minutes until Fradin, his ship badly damaged and his crew suffering heavy casualties, was forced to strike his colours.

As Tamise and Santa Margarita fought, Unicorn continued the pursuit of Tribune. Without the need to support the slower Tamise, Moulston was able to spread more sail and Tribune pulled ahead of her opponent during the afternoon the ships passing Tuskar Rock on the Wexford Coast. The French frigate's stern-chasers continued to inflict damage on Unicorn's rigging, at one point snatching away the main topsail and it was only when night fell, and the wind with it, that Williams was able to gain on the French ship through the use of studding sails. At 22:30, following a chase of 210 nautical miles (390 km) northwards into St George's Channel, Unicorn was finally able to pull alongside Tribune. For 35 minutes the frigates battered at one another from close range. Under cover of smoke, Moulston then attempted to escape by pulling Tribune back and turning across Unicorn's stern, seeking to rake the British frigate and move to windward. Realising Moulston's intent, Williams hauled his sails around, effectively throwing Unicorn in reverse. As the British ship sailed suddenly backwards she crossed Tribune's bow, raking the French ship with devastating effect. From this vantage point the fire from Unicorn succeeded in collapsing the foremast and mainmast on Tribune and shooting away the mizen topmast, rendering the French ship unmanageable. With no hope of escape and casualties rapidly mounting, the wounded Moulston surrendered to Williams.

The engagements were relatively evenly matched: Tamise and Santa Margarita carried similar weight of shot (279 pounds (127 kg) to 250 pounds (110 kg)) although Tamise had seventy more crew members (306 to 237) and Santa Margarita was slightly more than a third larger (993bm to 656bm). Naval historian William James credits Santa Margarita's larger size as giving her the advantage. In the second action, Tribune also had a much larger crew than Unicorn (339 to 240) and was substantially larger (916bm to 791bm), but Unicorn, equipped with 18-pounder long guns, massed a far larger weight of shot (348 pounds (158 kg) to 260 pounds (120 kg)), which proved decisive. Both engagements saw similar casualty ratios, with Tamise losing 32 killed and 19 wounded, some of whom later died, and Tribune suffering 37 killed and 15 wounded, including Moulston, while losses on Santa Margarita and Unicorn were two killed and three wounded and none at all respectively.

== Proserpine ==
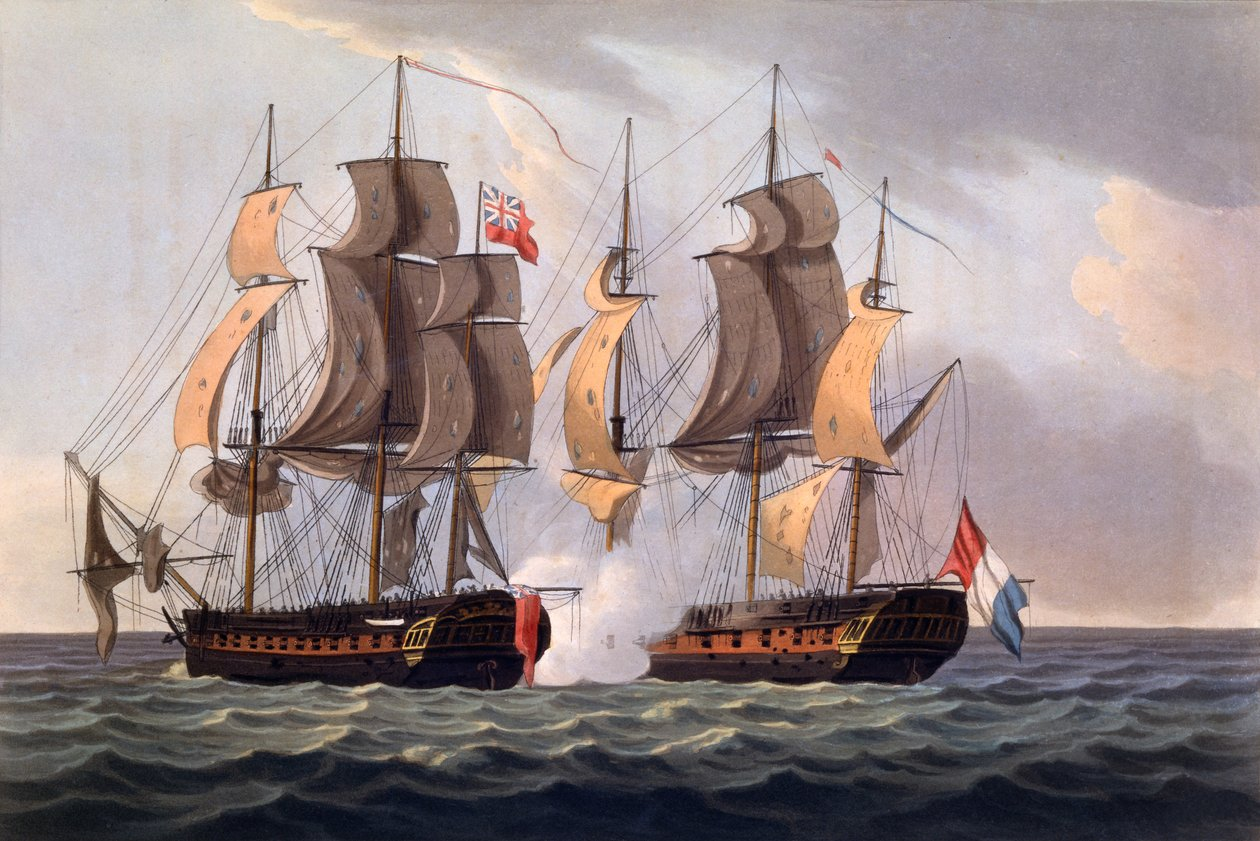
1816 illustration of Dryad (left) capturing Proserpine (right) by Whitcombe

While Tamise and Tribune met their fates in the Channel, Proserpine had continued unmolested to the cruising ground off the County Cork coast. At 01:00 on 13 June, 36 nautical miles (67 km) southeast of Cape Clear Island, Pevrieux' crew sighted a sail approaching from the northeast. Pevrieux was searching for Moulston's squadron, and allowed his ship to close with the newcomer before discovering that it was the patrolling 36-gun British frigate HMS Dryad under Captain Lord Amelius Beauclerk. On realising the danger, Pevrieux tacked away from Dryad and attempted to escape to the southwest. This chase lasted most of the day, Beauclerk gradually gaining on his opponent until Pevrieux opened fire with his stern-chaser guns at 20:00.

Shot from the stern-chasers punched holes in Dryad's sails and damaged the rigging, but Beauclerk's ship continued to gain on Proserpine until at 21:00 Beauclerk was close enough to open fire with his main broadside. Some damage was done to the sails and rigging of Dryad in the exchange and at one point the ship's colours were shot away and had to be replaced, but casualties were light. On Proserpine casualties mounted quickly, and although her sails and rigging remained largely intact, significant damage to the hull and heavy losses among the crew convinced Pevrieux to surrender at 21:45.

As in the previous engagements, the French ship had a much larger crew, (346 to 254), although weight of shot (366 pounds (166 kg) to 407 pounds (185 kg)) and size (1059bm to 924bm) were more evenly distributed. Casualties displayed the same inequalities as in the earlier engagements, with two killed and seven wounded on Dryad but 30 killed and 45 wounded on Proserpine. In James' opinion, had Pevrieux opted to use his initial advantage of the weather gage to attack Dryad directly rather than attempt to escape he might have been able to defeat the British frigate.

== Aftermath ==
The last survivor of the squadron, Légėre, remained at sea for another nine days, capturing six merchant ships, before the corvette was intercepted at 48°30′N 08°28′W in the Western Approaches by the frigates HMS Apollo under Captain John Manley and HMS Doris under Captain Charles Jones. All of the captured ships were taken to Britain and were subsequently purchased for the Royal Navy, Tamise restored as HMS Thames, Tribune with the same name, Proserpine as HMS Amelia as there was already an HMS Proserpine in service, and Légėre anglicised as HMS Legere.

As the senior captain in the operation, Williams was subsequently knighted, although historian Tom Wareham considered that Martin's fight had been the harder-fought encounter. Wareham also considered that Beauclerk may not have been rewarded as he was already a member of the nobility. Historian James Henderson considered that Martin may not have been honoured for the engagement due to his youth: he was 23 years old at the time of the battle. The first lieutenants on each British ship were promoted to commanders and Commander Joseph Bullen, volunteering on board Santa Margarita, was promoted to post captain. More than five decades later, the Admiralty recognised the actions with the clasps "SANTA MARGARITA 8 JUNE 1796", "UNICORN 8 JUNE 1796" and "DRYAD 13 JUNE 1796" attached to the Naval General Service Medal, awarded upon application to all British participants still living in 1847.

Following the capture of Moulston's squadron there was little activity in the English Channel or Bay of Biscay almost to the end of the year. On 22 August a squadron under Sir John Borlase Warren drove ashore and destroyed the French frigate Andromaque at the Gironde, and on 24 October Santa Margarita successfully chased down and captured two heavily armed privateers in the same region as the action in June. In December 1796 however, after the British fleet had retired to Spithead for the winter, the main French fleet sailed from Brest for the first time since June 1795 on a major operation named the Expédition d'Irlande, a planned invasion of Ireland. Like their winter campaign of two years previously, and for much the same reasons, this ended in disaster with 12 ships wrecked or captured and thousands of soldiers and sailors drowned without a single successful landing.
