= Jean-François Tartu =

French naval officer (1751–1793)

- Born: 11 October 1751; Recouvrance
- Died: 24 October 1793 (aged 42); Uranie, off Gascogne
- Military career
- Allegiance: France
- Service years: 1766–1793
- Rank: Captain
- Commands: Uranie
- Conflicts: American Revolutionary War: Battle of Ushant; Capture of Grenada; Action of 22 December 1779; Battle of Martinique (WIA); Battle of the Chesapeake; Battle of the Saintes; French Revolutionary Wars: Action of 24 October 1793 †
- Awards: Bien mérité de la Patrie; Three ships named in his honour

Jean-François Tartu (Recouvrance, 11 October 1751 – Uranie, off Gascogne, 24 October 1793) was a French Navy officer, and hero of the French Revolution.

Tartu took part in the American War of Independence as a non-commissioned officer, taking part in several significant battles in the fleet of Admiral d'Estaing. After the end of the war, he worked at the naval foundry of Indret.

During the French Revolution, Tartu became a minor political figure; he assured the interim direction of the foundry, and at the outbreak of the war with Britain, obtained command of the frigate Uranie. He was killed in action on 24 October 1793 while disabling HMS Thames. Tartu was hailed as a hero, and Uranie was renamed Tartu in his honour.

== Career ==
Tartu was born to a family of fishers. He joined the French Royal Navy in 1766 as a sailor, at the age of 15, raising to master gunner.

=== Service on Fortunée ===
After enlisting in the French Royal Navy, Tartu was appointed as master gunner on the frigate Fortunée, under Bernard de Marigny. On Fortunée, he took part in the Battle of Ushant.

In 1779 sailed to Fort Royal to take part in a squadron under Lamotte-Picquet in the fleet of Admiral d'Estaing. On the background of the naval operations in the American Revolutionary War, Fortunée took part in the French operations on the Anglo-French War, notably in the Capture of Grenada.

In December 1779, Fortunée sailed in consort with the 32-gun Blanche, under La Galissonière, and the 20-gun corvette Ellis, (Note: A captured ship, formerly the British privateer Ellis (Roche, p.172)) under Captain Fonteneau, to ferry troops that had fought in the Siege of Savannah back to various French colonies of the Caribbean. On 21 December, between 15 and 18 miles (24 and 29 km) off Guadeloupe, the frigate squadron met a British four-ship division under Rear-Admiral Parker, comprising the 74-gun HMS Suffolk, Magnificent, Vengeance and the 64-gun Stirling Castle, sent by Rear-Admiral Rowley to intercept it. As the British squadron flew the French flag, the frigates continued on their route and approached until the ships hoisted British colours and gave chase; a running battle ensued and in the course of the next hours, the frigates were overhauled by the 74-guns and struck their colours, Fortunée surrendering after a two-hour cannonade, surrounded by two ships. Tartu was taken prisoner with the crew of Fortunée.

=== Service under Marigny ===
After being exchanged, Tartu served on Sphinx, again under Marigny. He took part in the Battle of Martinique on 17 April 1780, where he was wounded. (Note: Tartu's elder brother François-Marie, who served as a gunner on Indien, was killed during the battle. (Granier, p.79))

Returned to France, Tartu was appointed to the Vaillant, again under Marigny, on which he took part in the Battle of the Chesapeake. He transferred to Réfléchi. and on to César.

On César, Tartu took part in the Battle of the Saintes. Marigny was mortally wounded, and entrusted Tartu with jewelry before dying. César blew up, throwing Tartu overboard; he was rescued by the British, who seized the jewelry.

=== Naval foundry of Indret ===
Tartu was released at the Peace of Paris; he returned to Brest and married.

Upon his return, Tartu worked at the naval foundry of Indret. In 1786, he was promoted to sous-lieutenant de vaisseau, and appointed controller the next year. Despite the money bestowed by these promotions, Tartu lived in relative poverty due to his 7-child family. In March 1791, he was appointed Knight of the Order of Saint-Louis.

=== Political activities during the French Revolution ===
After the outbreak of the French Revolution, the director of the foundry emigrated and was replaced by a militant Republican. Tartu was elected substitute deputy to the National Convention for Loire-Inférieure; he never served at the Convention in this capacity, but in early 1793, he accompanied représentant en mission Fouché to Paimboeuf.

Tartu went on to serve as interim director for the foundry of Indret. Tartu was promoted to captain in January 1793. After France declared war to Britain on 1 February 1793, Tartu requested command of a warship. On 13 March, he was appointed to command the 40-gun frigate Uranie, then under commissioning in Rochefort.

=== Service on Uranie ===
In June, Tartu returned to Indret to dispose of rusted cannonball from Rochefort in the foundry and to recruit crewmembers. Uranie departed Rochefort in August, and engaged in commerce raiding. On 25 August, Tartu observed the Ancien Régime custom of firing salvoes for Saint Louis Day. After completing her patrol, Uranie returned to Rochefort.

Uranie departed for another patrol in the Bay of Biscay on 24 September, in a frigate squadron under Captain Allemand consisting of the frigates Carmagnole, Résolue, Sémillante and Uranie with the brig-corvette Espiègle. Uranie captured two Spanish brigs, which were scuttled, a wheat merchantmen from Genoa and a British merchantman. On 22 October, the squadron sighted the 16-gun Spanish brig Alcoudia and Allemand detached Uranie to capture her. Uranie also captured the liner Quiros. On 24 October, Uranie met with the 32-gun HMS Thames. In the ensuing Action of 24 October 1793, Uranie engaged in an artillery duel rather than attempting a boarding, as she lacked 60 of her sailors, despatched in prize crews over three captured ships, and was burdened with over 260 prisoners.

In the artillery duel, Thames lost most of her rigging and suffered heavy damage to her port batteries. As she manoeuvered to train her intact starboard batteries on Uranie, one of her cannonballs swept Uranie's quarterdeck, killing two and severing Tartu's leg below the knee. The first officer of Uranie, Lieutenant Wuibert, immediately rushed to take command as Tartu was brought below decks; soon afterwards, a dying Tartu instructed the lieutenant to break the engagement, as the drifting Thames was still heading towards the British blockade.

Uranie suffered 4 killed and 7 wounded. Thames was captured the next day by Carmagnole, under Captain Allemand.

== Legacy ==
Tartu was hailed as a hero, and Uranie was renamed after him. His widow was awarded a pension by the National Convention, which passed a resolution that the crew of Uranie had bien mérité de la Patrie.

Tartu's 10-year-old son was aboard Uranie and took part in the action of 24 October 1793 as a boy; contemporary propaganda has it that on his death bed, Tartu told him

My son, I die for the liberty of my country. Learn to fight for it and be the enemy of tyrans! (Note: "Mon fils, je meurs pour la liberté de mon pays. Apprends à combattre pour elle et sois l'ennemi des tyrans !")

Two destroyers were later named in his honour (a Vauquelin class and a T 53 class).

Ships of the French Navy named Tartu
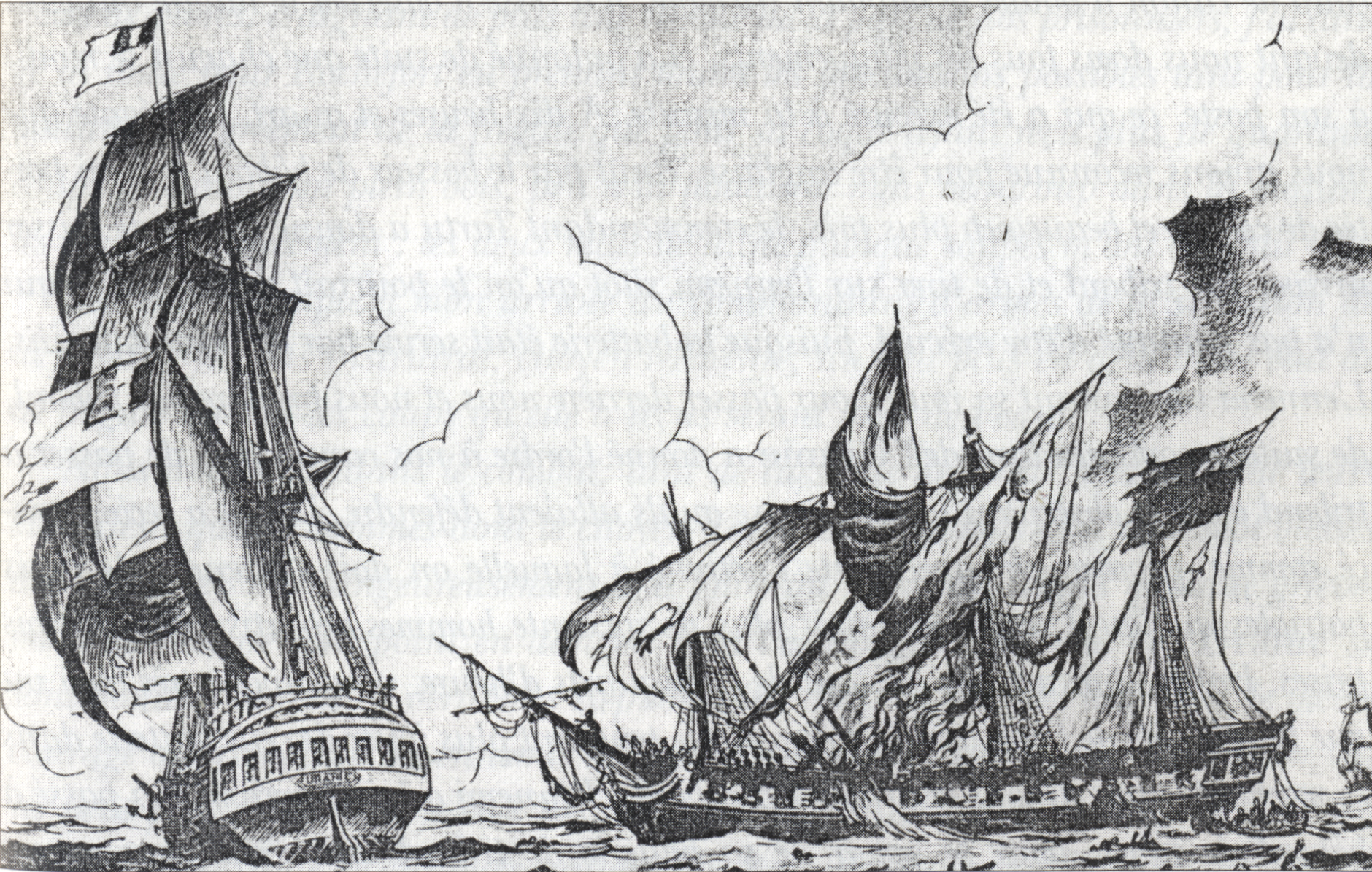
Uranie, later renamed Tartu, in battle with HMS Thames

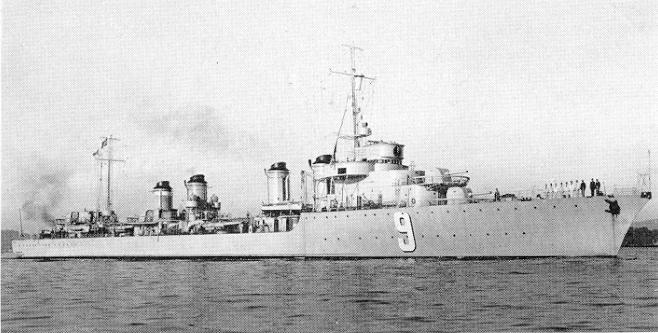
The Vauquelin-class destroyer Kersaint, sister-ship of Tartu

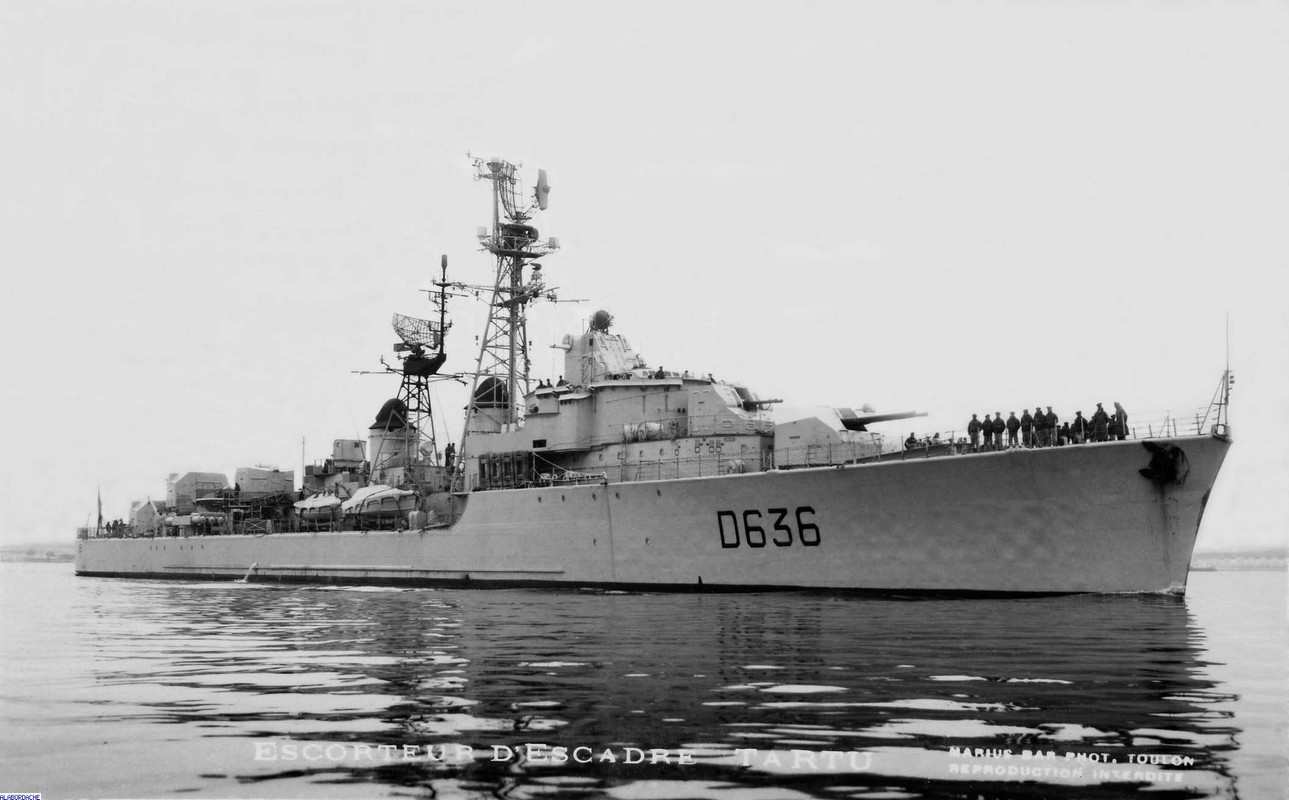
The T 53-class Tartu

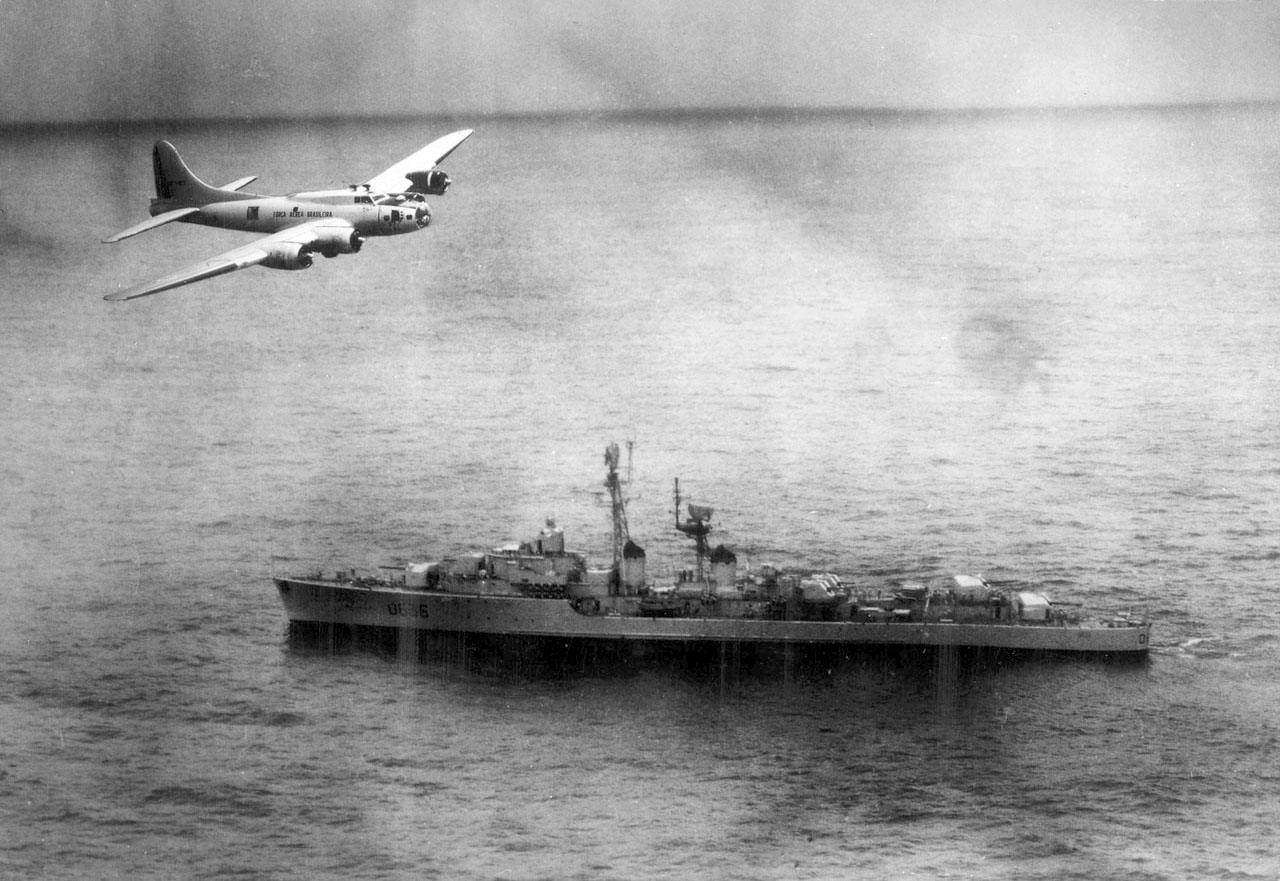
A Brazilian Air Force Boeing B-17 Flying Fortress flying over the T 53-class Tartu, off the coast of Brazil during the 1963 Lobster War

== Bibliography ==
- Granier, Hubert (1998). Histoire des Marins français 1789-1815. illustrations by Alain Coz. Marines éditions. ISBN 2-909675-41-6.
- James, William (2002) [1827]. The Naval History of Great Britain, Volume 1, 1793–1796. London: Conway Maritime Press. ISBN 0-85177-905-0.
- Levot, Prosper (1866). Les gloires maritimes de la France: notices biographiques sur les plus célèbres marins (in French). Bertrand.
- Roche, Jean-Michel (2005). Dictionnaire des bâtiments de la flotte de guerre française de Colbert à nos jours. Vol. 1. Group Retozel-Maury Millau. ISBN 978-2-9525917-0-6. OCLC 165892922.
- Rouvier, Charles (1868). Histoire des marins français sous la République, de 1789 à 1803 (in French). Arthus Bertrand.
