= Édouard Thomas Burgues de Missiessy =

French Navy officer

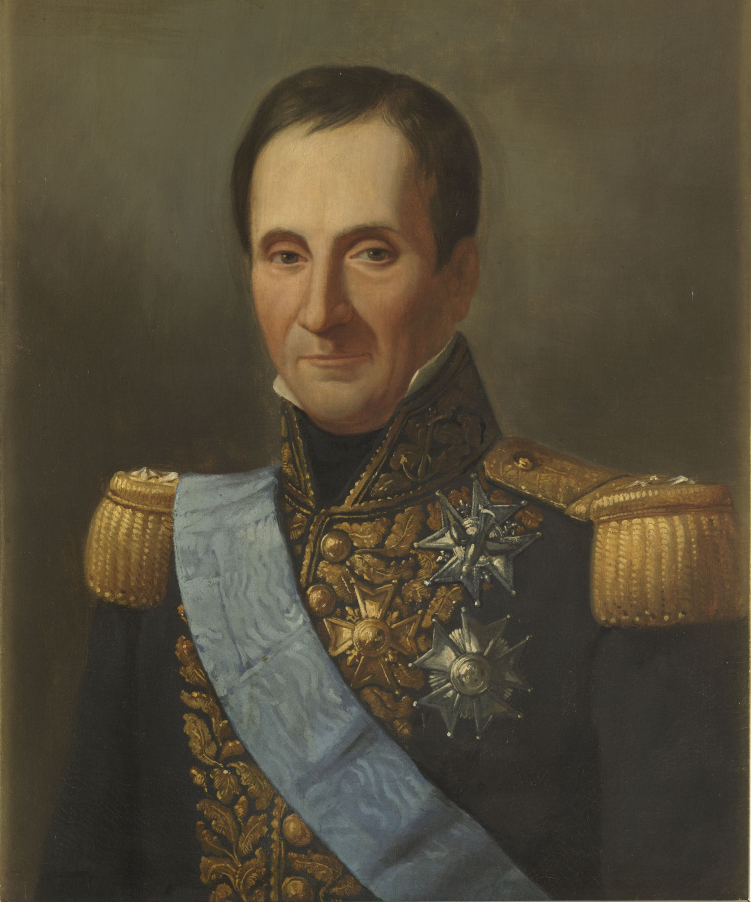
- Portrait by Charles-Alexandre Debacq, 1850
- Born: 23 April 1756; Toulon, France
- Died: 24 March 1837 (aged 80); Toulon, France
- Military career
- Allegiance: Kingdom of France; French First Republic; First French Empire
- Branch: French Navy; French Imperial Navy
- Service years: 1766–1832
- Commands: Pygmée; Censeur; Belette; Modeste; Centaure
- Conflicts: American Revolutionary War; French Revolutionary Wars; Napoleonic Wars
- Awards: Count of the Empire; Grand Cross of the Legion of Honour; Knight Commander of the Holy Spirit
- Other work: Maritime Prefect, Paris; Maritime Prefect, Le Havre; Maritime Prefect, Toulon

Vice-Admiral Édouard-Thomas de Burgues, comte de Missiessy (French pronunciation: [edwaʁ tɔmɑ byʁɡ də misjesi]; 23 April 1756 – 24 March 1837) was a French Navy officer. He joined the navy in April 1766 as a volunteer aboard his father's ship and spent most of his early service in the Mediterranean, in the frigates of the Levant Fleet. When France entered the American Revolutionary War, Missiessy joined the 64-gun Vaillant in Admiral Charles Henri Hector, Count of Estaing's fleet, where he took part in the initial engagements off Newport, Saint Lucia and Grenada, and in September 1779, the failed siege of Savannah. Missiessy's first command came in 1782 when he was promoted to ship-of-the-line lieutenant on the cutter Le Pygmée. He was soon after captured by the British but later released in a prisoner exchange.

In 1789, the year of the outbreak of the French Revolution, Missiessy was a frigate captain in the Mediterranean. Promoted to ship-of-the-line captain in January 1792, he received the command of the ship Centaure in Vice-admiral Laurent Jean François Truguet's squadron. In January 1793, he was promoted to counter admiral. The Revolution became more radical and Missiessy was arrested on 21 May 1793 for being of noble birth. He was released and returned to duty on 30 June but when Toulon declared for the King, Missiessy fled to Italy. He did not return to France until 1795 and despite being acquitted by a court of enquiry, he was not given a ship and spent the next six years working ashore.

In 1804, Missiessy was appointed commander-in-chief of the Rochefort squadron with a key role in Napoleon's planned invasion of the United Kingdom. The Rochefort squadron was intended to rendezvous with Vice-admiral Pierre-Charles Villeneuve's fleet in the West Indies and draw British ships there, before racing back across the Atlantic and seizing control of the English Channel. The failure of this plan was blamed in part on Missiessy and he was dismissed from the navy. He was not employed again until February 1808 when he was made commander-in-chief of the defences at the Scheldt, foiling the British Walcheren Campaign that occurred between July and September 1809. Missiessy ceased active service on 17 September 1824 and was officially acknowledged as retired on 23 April 1832, when his name was entered on the retirement list. He died at Toulon on 24 March 1837, aged 80.

== Early life and career ==
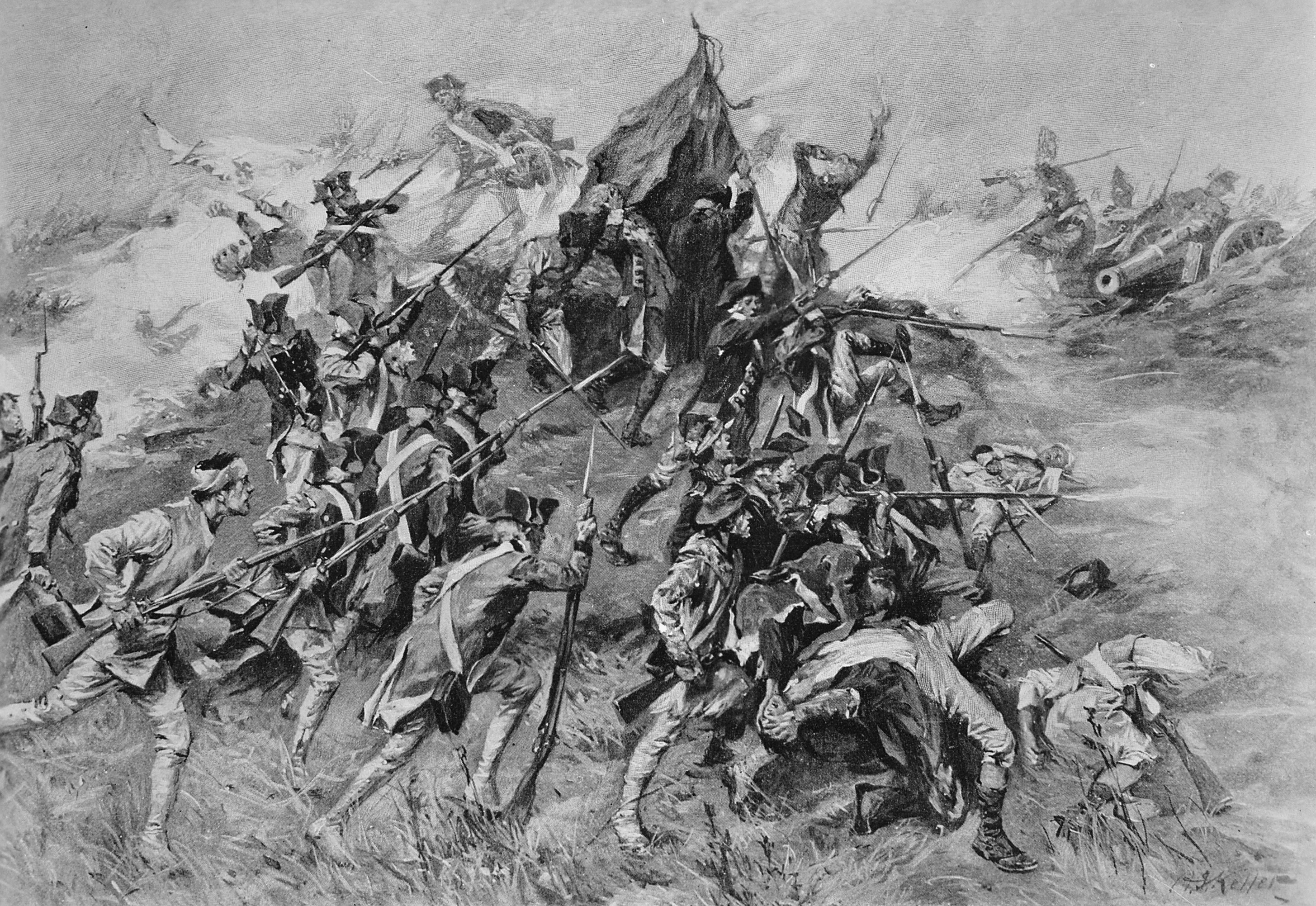
The siege of Savannah, which Missiessy took part in

Édouard-Thomas de Burgues, comte de Missiessy was born on 23 April 1756, in Forcalquier, Alpes-de-Haute-Provence. He joined the navy in April 1766, at the age of 10, as a volunteer aboard his father's ship, Altier. Most of his early service was spent in the Mediterranean, aboard the frigates of the Toulon Fleet. In April 1773, while a Garcon-Major on the Engageante, he embarked on a lengthy cruise to the Levant which lasted until January 1774. Another 9 month trip to the Levant took place between May 1774 and February 1775. Missiessy undertook a third cruise to the Levant between October 1775 and September 1776, this time as a Garde du Pavillon aboard the frigate Flore. Missiessy was promoted to enseigne de vaisseau in April 1777 and joined Sultane for an expedition to the Barbary Coast, where he helped prevent attacks on French shipping by corsairs.

During the American War of Independence, he served Admiral Charles Henri Hector, Count of Estaing's fleet. Aboard the 64-gun Vaillant, Missiessy participated in initial engagements off Newport, St Lucia and Grenada, and in September 1779 took part in the failed attack on Savannah. In December, Missiessy sailed for Lorient but by February the following year, he was on his way back to America in the 32-gun frigate, Surveillante.

== Command ==
Missiessy was promoted to lieutenant de vaisseau on 9 May 1781 and returned to France in December 1781. He received his first command in March 1782, the cutter Le Pygmée, stationed at Brest but was shortly after captured by the British on 27 July 1782. Briefly confined at Deal, Kent, he was exchanged and by September, was serving as second officer aboard the 64-gun Reflechi. In early February 1783, he joined the 74-gun Censeur, returning home in April. From May 1786, Missiessy commanded transport ships operating in the Baltic.

=== Imprisonment and exile ===
The French Revolution broke out in May 1789 and Missiessy spent August through to January 1792 in the Mediterranean, where he commanded the frigates Belette and Modeste. Promoted to capitaine de vaisseau in January 1791, he received the command of the ship Centaure in Vice-admiral Laurent Jean François Truguet's squadron. In January 1793, he was promoted to counter admiral. However, the Revolution was becoming more radical and Missiessy was suspected of noble birth and opposing the new regime. He was sent ashore and arrested on 21 May 1793 but was released and returned to duty on 30 June.

When Toulon revolted, declaring for King Louis XVII and inviting the British in, Missiessy abandoned his command and fled to Italy. He returned to France in May 1795, where he faced a court of enquiry. On 25 August, Missiessy was acquitted and released. He was not given another ship however and instead served at the department of Charts and Maps, in Paris, until 1796, then as director of the School of Naval Construction for four years after.

In June 1801, Missiessy's old commander, Truget, requested him as his chief of staff for the combined French and Spanish fleet stationed at Cadiz but when peace was declared in March 1802, he was ordered back to Paris and made Maritime Prefect. This was one of the first appointments of its kind, with responsibility for port facilities and fleet services. It was soon after decided to create similar positions for all French naval bases and in July, Missiessy took the job at the port of Le Havre.

=== West Indies ===
Truget called upon Missiessy again in October 1801, when he needed someone to command a squadron of ships at Brest. Missiessy held the post until 10 September 1804, when he was appointed commander-in-chief of the Rochefort squadron. The Rochefort squadron was a key element in Napoleon's planned invasion of the United Kingdom; intended to rendezvous with Vice-admiral Pierre-Charles Villeneuve's fleet in the West Indies and draw British ships there, before racing back across the Atlantic and seizing control of the English Channel. On 11 January 1805 the blockading British ships were blown off station, allowing Missiessy's force to escape. Aboard the five ships of the line, three frigates and two corvettes were 3,500 troops under Divisional-general Joseph Lagrange along with artillery pieces, small arms and supplies to reinforce the French garrisons in Martinique and Guadeloupe. The same wind that disrupted the British blockaders kept Missiessy's squadron pinned to the coast for five days and delayed their arrival in Martinique until 20 February.

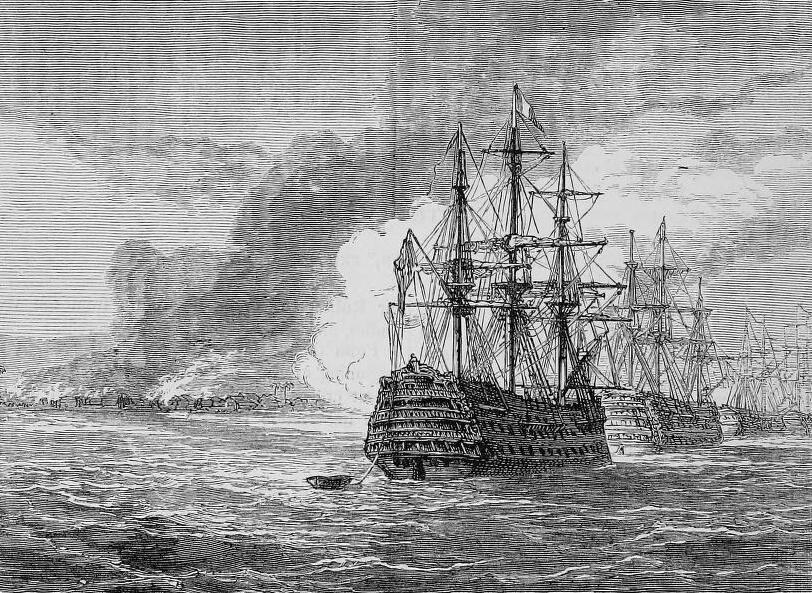
Missiessy's squadron off Roseau on 25 February 1805

The approach to Martinique was guarded by a British battery mounted on Diamond Rock, forcing enemy ships to make a long detour through unfavourable open sea with strong winds and currents. British control of the rock was a constant irritation for the French and Missiessy was keen to recapture it. However, he was unable to convince Lagrange or Governor Louis Thomas Villaret de Joyeuse to attack the rock. It was instead agreed that the French would to invade the British colony of Dominica. The invasion began on 22 February but the colony's garrison despite being outnumbered three to one fiercely resisted the French. When Lagrange's troops failed to capture Prince Rupert Fort the French withdrew on 25 February, destroying and burning as much as they could on the way, including the colonial capital of Roseau.

On 28 February Missiessy's squadron transported troops and military supplies to Guadeloupe, and between 5 and 10 March it attacked the British colonies of Saint Kitts, Nevis and Montserrat, collecting £25,000 in ransom money in the process. Returning to Martinique, Missiessy discovered that his squadron had been ordered to return to Europe and Napoleon's planned invasion had been postponed. Missiessy disembarked his remaining troops at Santo Domingo and set sail for France, arriving in Rochefort on 20 May. Despite carrying out his orders in full, Missiessy was made a scapegoat for Villeneuve's failings and lambasted by Napoleon for not recapturing Diamond Rock. He was dismissed and command of the Rochefort squadron passed to his second-in-command, Zacharie Allemand.

== Later career ==
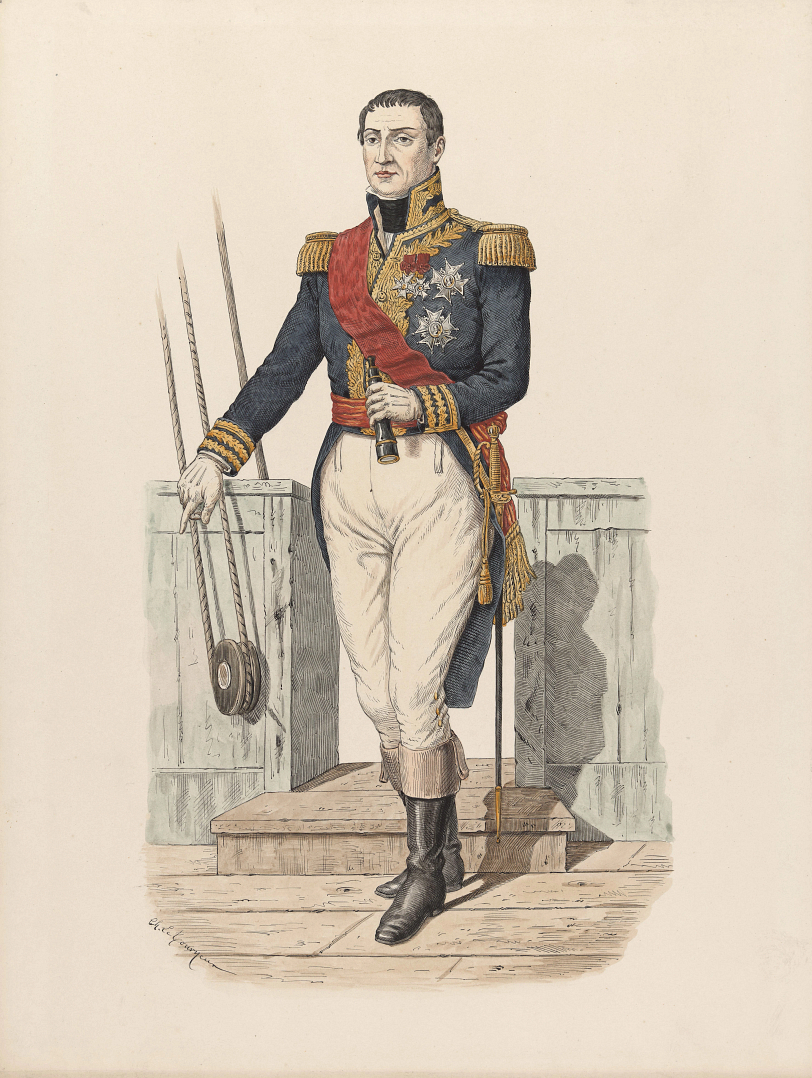
c. 1850 portrait of Missiessy

In February 1808, having been unemployed since his return from the West Indies, Missiessy was given command of the Scheldt squadron and successfully defended Antwerp from the British attacks that occurred between July and September 1809, part of the ill-fated Walcheren Campaign. Having already been promoted to vice admiral on 9 March, he was rewarded for his efforts with appointment to Commander-in-Chief of the Northern Coasts and made a Count of the Empire on 23 February 1811, the latter position coming with an annuity of 20,000 francs.

In August 1814, the restored French king, Louis XVIII awarded Missiessy the Grand Cross of the Legion of Honour. During the Hundred Days uprising, Missiessy avoided taking sides and was further rewarded following the Bourbon restoration in June 1815: He was Maritime Prefect of Toulon and was elevated to Commander-in-Chief there in January 1816, later serving on the Council of the Admiralty, and finally Commander-in-Chief of the navy.

Missiessy ceased active service on 17 September 1824. In June 1827, he was made a Knight Commander of the Holy Spirit and was officially acknowledged as retired on 23 April 1832, when his name was entered on the retirement list. He died at Toulon on 24 March 1837, aged 80.
