= HMS Unicorn (1794) =

Frigate of the Royal Navy

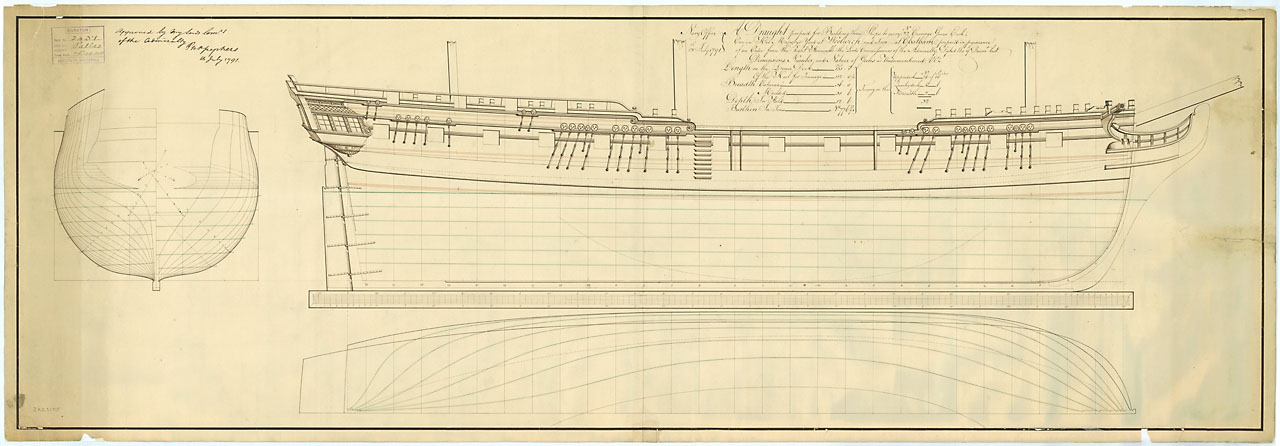
- Unicorn

History

Great Britain
- Name: HMS Unicorn
- Ordered: 9 December 1790
- Builder: M/Shipwright John Nelson (died March 1793; completed by Thomas Pollard, Chatham Dockyard
- Laid down: March 1792
- Launched: 12 July 1794
- Honours and awards: Naval General Service Medal (NGSM) with clasp; "Unicorn 8 June 1796"; "Basque Roads"
- Fate: Broken up in March 1815

General characteristics
- Class & type: 32-gun Pallas-class frigate
- Tons burthen: 7913/94 bm
- Length: 135 ft 8 3/4 in (41.4 m)
- Beam: 36 ft 2 3/4 in (11.0 m)
- Depth of hold: 12 ft 5 3/4 in (3.8 m)
- Sail plan: Full-rigged ship
- Armament: Upper deck: 26 × 18-pounder guns; QD: 4 × 6-pounder guns + 4 × 32-pounder carronades; Fc: 2 × 6-pounder guns + 2 × 32-pounder carronades

HMS Unicorn was a 32-gun fifth-rate Pallas-class frigate of the Royal Navy, launched in 1794 at Chatham. This frigate served in both the French Revolutionary Wars and the Napoleonic Wars, including a medal action early in her career. She was broken up in 1815.

== French Revolutionary War ==
Unicorn entered service in 1794 under the command of Captain William Cayley, who was followed in 1795 by Captain Thomas Williams. Under Williams, Unicorn served in the Western Approaches, operating from Cork. On 31 May, Unicorn, Scipio and Latona shared in the capture of the Dutch schooner Mary, Captain Pierce, master.

On 28 August 1795, Unicorn was in company with Diana and Seahorse, when Unicorn captured the Dutch East Indiaman Cromhout or Crumhout. Cromhout's capture resulted in at least £40,000 in prize money to be distributed among her captors.

Then Unicorn parted company with the rest of the squadron and after a chase of 13 hours captured the Dutch brig Komeet (or Comet), which was under the command of Captain-Lieutenant Mynheer Claris. Comet was only four years old, in excellent condition, and armed with 18 English 9-pounder guns. She was sailing from the Cape of Good Hope to the Texel and was provisioned with water and food for 110 men for a nine-month cruise. The Royal Navy took her into service as HMS Comeet.

Crumhout, Komeet, and a third vessel, the southern whale ship Horstfelder, that the British also captured, were part of a convoy of nine East Indiamen and two naval vessels, Komeet and Scipio. Scipio escorted the remaining Indiamen into Norwegian waters, which they reached on 22 September. Scipio and three of the Indiamen reached Trondheim on 6 October. The remaining Indiamen went to Bergen and Ålesund.

On 10 April 1796, Unicorn recaptured the brig Thames while in company with Penguin and the hired armed cutter Fox. Unicorn, Fox, Dryad, Diana and Seahorse, were in company when Dryad captured the French cutter Abeille.

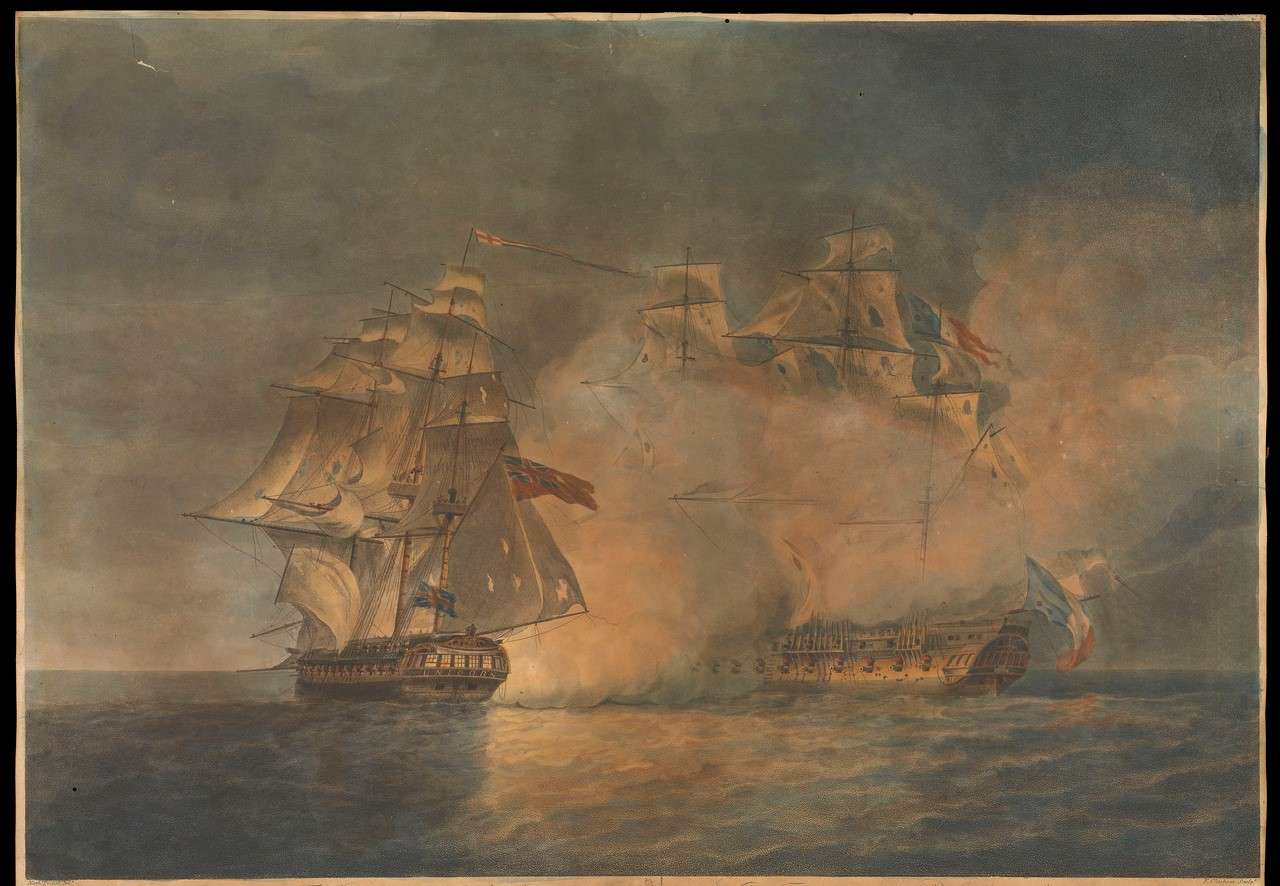
The capture of the French frigate Tribune by HMS Unicorn, by Nicholas Pocock

On 7 June, Unicorn and Santa Margarita captured a large ship flying Swedish colours and carrying Dutch goods from Surinam, which turned out to be the Gustavus Adolphus. The commander of the prize crew, a lieutenant from Unicorn, advised Admiral Sir Robert Kingsmill, commander in chief of the Cork station, that when he had last seen Unicorn and Santa Margarita they were chasing three French vessels, the frigates Tamise and Tribune, and the corvette Legere.

In the action of 8 June 1796, Unicorn captured the 44-gun Tribune. Before Unicorn could bring Tribune to close action the two vessels engaged in a ten-hour-long running fight. The actual close engagement lasted 35 minutes before Tribune struck. She was under the command of Commodore John Moulston and had lost 37 men killed of her crew of 337 men, as well as 15 wounded. (Moulston, who was wounded in the action, was an American who had served in the French Navy for 16 years.) Unicorn had no losses.

The Royal Navy took Tribune into service under her existing name. Williams earned a knighthood for his victory. In 1847 the Admiralty awarded the remaining survivors of the action the NGSM with clasp "Unicorn 8 June 1796".

Santa Margarita captured Tamise in an action that would ultimately yield her crew a clasp to the NGSM. Legere escaped. Dryad captured the fourth vessel in Moulston's squadron, the 26-gun frigate Proserpine, which had earlier parted company with her companion vessels in a fog. The British took Proserpine into service as Amelia.

In September to early October, Unicorn captured five vessels sailing from Surinam to Amsterdam:

- Eliza (22 September);
- Orion (23 September);
- Christian the Seventh (24 September):
- Whilhemsberg (1 October); and
- Freiheden (4 October).

On 21 October Unicorn captured the 6-gun privateer Enterprise in the Irish Sea. Enterprise had a crew of 40 men and was 28 days out of Brest. During her cruise she had captured a Portuguese ship, two English brigs, and a sloop.

In December, Unicorn was one of the few British ships able to respond to the French effort to invade Ireland during the Expédition d'Irlande. On 7 January 1797, Unicorn was able to capture the troopship Ville de Lorient with Doris and Druid and pursue the French flagship in the closing days of the campaign. Eleven days later Unicorn, Doris and Druid captured the privateer Eclair, of 18 guns and a crew of 120 men, in the Channel. Unicorn then rejoined the British fleet. In August, Unicorn was in company with Apollo when they recaptured the Somerset at Cove, near Cork.

In March 1797 command passed to Captain James Young and then to Captain Phillip Wilkinson in April 1799. (Note: Wilkinson would later change his name to Stephens.) Unicorn captured a French brig in March 1799.

On 9 June 1799 Unicorn and the hired armed cutter Constitution captured the French brig St. Antoine. On 10 June, two of Unicorn's boats, together with two each from Renown, Fisgard and Defence, all of Sir John Borlase Warren's squadron, captured the gunboat Nochette, two other armed vessels, and eight transports carrying supplies for the fleet at Brest. Nochette was armed with two 24-pounder guns. The two other armed vessels were chasse-marée armed with eight and six guns. The transports consisted of two brigs, two sloops, and four chasse-marée, which were carrying wine, brandy, flour and peas. In addition, the crews of 20 French vessels ran their vessels ashore, where many were probably wrecked. The British suffered four men wounded, but none were from Unicorn. Unicorn was short of water so Admiral St. Vincent ordered her to escort the prizes back to Plymouth and then immediately return to her station. Unicorn arrived at Plymouth on 18 June with ten vessels, one having foundered on the way. (The crew was saved.) She sailed for Brest on 27 June. Next, Unicorn participated in the attempt on the Spanish squadron in Aix Roads on 2 July.

On 6 January 1800 Unicorn was among the five vessels that shared in the capture of the French brig Ursule (or Huzelle). On 7 January, the French armed ship Huzelle came into Plymouth. She had been carrying passengers from Cayenne, including women and children, when Amethyst captured her. On her way in to a British port, the French privateer Providence, of 14 guns and 152 men, had recaptured her and sent her to Bordeaux. However, before she got there, Unicorn and Beaulieu recaptured her in turn and sent her into Plymouth. Huzelle was low on provision with the result that a five-year-old child died while she was in Plymouth Sound; as she anchored at Catwater, M.P. Symonds, the broker for the prize, sent on board plenty of fresh provisions. Among Huzelle's passengers were a Colonel Molonson of Invalids, and a naturalist, M. Burnelle, with a cabinet of curiosities for the French National Museum at Paris.

In June Unicorn was still with Warren's squadron off the Atlantic coast of France. She therefore shared in the capture on 11 June of ten merchant vessels: the brig Rosalie, Baure Paire, the sloop Rosalie, Bonne Nouvelle, Oiseau, Felicite, Nochelle, St. Claire, Henrietta, and Maree Francaise. Unicorn was also among the five ships that shared in the proceeds of the capture of the French privateer Rancune, taken on 27 September. Unicorn shared in some of these prizes by virtue of being part of Admiral Keats' squadron. She also shared in the captures of Girone (28 July), Revanche (28 July), Alerte (1 July), Joseph (3 August), Vivo (30 September), and Magicienne (16 October). Unicorn shared with four other vessels in the capture of Union on 14 August. On 15 August Unicorn recaptured Petit Bastien, and four days later Hirondelle.

Command then passed to Captain Charles Wemyss in 1801. On 14 August Wemyss wrote to Admiral W. Cornwallis stating that he had only been able to capture one chasse-marée, of 40 tons, which was carrying a cargo of lime. Not only was she not worth sending in, capturing her cost Unicorn one man killed and one man slightly wounded. Wemyss had also destroyed another chasse-marée, also of 40 tons that was carrying a cargo of corn. Captain Charles Stuart replaced Wemyss in 1802. In April and May 1803 Unicorn was placed in dock at Chatham for extensive repairs.

== Napoleonic Wars ==
Unicorn was recommissioned in April 1803 under Captain Lucius Hardyman for the North Sea. An assignment to escort a convoy of merchantmen from Sheerness to Riga was abandoned in mid-June due to poor weather. On 23 June she captured the Dutch fishing vessel Jonge Johannes, then on 17 September the neutral ship Catharina Louisa, which the High Court of Admiralty later restored to her owners. Then on 6 October she recaptured the William and Thomas. The salvage from William and Thomas went in whole or in part to pay expenses relating to the detention of Catherina Louisa. On 25 October Unicorn and Antelope captured Catharina Tholens.

Unicorn sailed for Jamaica on 23 December 1804. On the morning of 6 May 1805, Unicorn was eight or nine leagues (39 or 43 km) north east by north of Cape Francois, off St. Domingo when she saw a strange sail seven or eight miles (11 or 13 km) away. There was little wind so Handyman sent out four boats in chase. After rowing for many hours, and despite finally facing cannon and small arms fire, the British captured the privateer without taking any casualties. She turned out to be Tape-a-Bord, under the command of Citizen Hemiguelth. She was armed with four 6-pounder guns, and carried 46 men. She was out of Samana and had been on a cruise for 10 days without taking any prizes. On 15 October Unicorn captured the Spanish ship Notre Dame de la Carmen, which was on her way from Havana to Cadiz with a cargo of cocoa.

On 7 May 1806, Unicorn captured the French privateer Galatea.

Unicorn sailed for the River Plate on 7 October 1806. She then was off Buenos Aires during the British invasions of the Río de la Plata.

In 1808 she returned to Britain. By 29 June she was off France when she, Seine, Comet and Cossack captured the French brig Pierre Caesar. The Admiralty took Pierre Caesar into service as Tigress.

On 6 August Cossack captured Mouche with Unicorn, sharing in the prize money by agreement. Around 15 or 28 October Unicorn and Thisbe captured General Mulenfelis or General Muhlenfels.

In 1809 Unicorn was present at the Battle of Basque Roads. Imperieuse had taken up a position by the Boyard Shoal. The frigates Unicorn, Aigle, and Pallas anchored close to her. Their task was to retrieve the returning crews of the fireships and to support the boats of the fleet that had assembled alongside Caesar, to assist the fireships. As it turned out the boats were not used. Still, in 1847 the Admiralty awarded the NGSM with clasp "Basque Roads" to all surviving claimants from the action.

Captain Alexander Robert Kerr assumed command in August 1809.

On 12 April 1810, Unicorn captured the 22-gun Esperence off the Île de Ré. Esperence was the former British Post-ship Laurel, but was armed en flute. She was under the command of a lieutenant de vaisseau and carrying a cargo of colonial produce from Île de France. In November 1810 Unicorn received an advance of £14,000 on the prize money from the capture of Esperence.

Unicorn captured the privateer Gascon on 3 February 1810. Gascon carried 16 guns and 113 men. She was two days out of Bayonne without having taken any prizes. (Note: Gascon was offered for sale on 16 March 1810 at Plymouth. The advertisement for the auction described her as having a burthen of 29469/94 tons, a length of 92 ft 10 1/2 in (28.3 m), and a breadth of 27 ft 6 in (8.4 m).)

In April 1811 Captain George Bourgoyne Salt assumed command. Between 19 November and 3 February 1812 Unicorn captured five vessels: Industry (19 November), Jane (21 November), Fly (18 January), Manlius (21 January), and Good Intent (3 February). Unicorn shared the capture of Manlius with Scylla. On 30 March 1813 the frigate Stag and Unicorn captured the French privateer Miquelonnaise, of St Malo. She was pierced for 20 guns but carried 18, two long 12-pounders, eight long 6-pounders and eight 12-pounder carronades. She had a crew of 130 men and was about six months old. On this cruise she had been out four days from Quimper and had taken the small brig Alexander, which had been carrying a cargo of tin and iron from London to Lisbon. Miquelonnaise sank the brig rather than bringing her in.

In April Stag, with Unicorn in sight, took the 2-gun privateer schooner Hébé, the former Royal Navy schooner Laura. The Royal Navy took her back into service as Lauretsinus. On 21 May, Unicorn captured the American schooner Miranda, of Rhode Island. She had a crew of six men, a burthen of 104 tons, and was sailing for Matunzas with a cargo of lumber. (Note: Originally, the British merchantmen William Ashton, William Dawson, and Mary had captured Miranda. However, the United States privateer Paul Jones had recaptured Miranda, only to have her fall into Royal Navy hands.) (Note: On 23 May 1813 HMS Leonidas captured Paul Jones off Ireland. Paul Jones was armed with 16 guns and had a crew of 85 men under the command of Captain Archibald Taylor. She had been out two months and had captured three prizes.)

Captain Samuel George Pechell took command of Unicorn in 1814. While under the command of Kerr, Salt, or Pechell, Unicorn sent in her boats to cut out a large brig sheltering under the batteries at Belle Île. The expedition cost the British two men killed. Unicorn also participated in the support of Spanish forces in the north of Spain, in the blockade of the Texel, and in patrols off the coast of Norway. Lastly, she also conveyed various members of the Royal Family to and from the Continent.

== Fate ==
Unicorn was sold out of the service and broken up at Deptford in March 1815.
