= The Royal School, Haslemere =

Location
- Farnham Lane; Haslemere, Surrey, GU27 1HQ; England; 51°06′17″N 0°43′25″W

Information
- Type: Private day and boarding
- Motto: ‘Per Aspera Ad Astra’
- Religious affiliation: Church of England
- Established: 1840
- Founder: Vice-Admiral Sir Jahleel Brenton, Admiral Sir Thomas Williams and Captain Hon. Francis Maude established The Royal Naval School
- Closed: 2025
- Department for Education URN: 125348 Tables
- President: HRH The Princess Royal
- Headmaster: Paul Norman
- Staff: 80
- Gender: Girls (1840-2011); Mixed (2011-2025)
- Age: 10 to 18
- Enrolment: 200
- Houses: Balmoral; Buckingham; Sandringham; Windsor
- Affiliation: United Church Schools Trust
- Website: http://www.royal-school.org/

The Royal School, Haslemere was a private co-educational day and boarding school for pupils aged 10 to 18. The original Royal Naval School was founded for the daughters and sisters of Naval and Marine Officers in 1840. From the outset the founders’ ambition was for the girls to become independent. The school began accepting boys in 2011 and then became fully co-educational in 2019 when The Royal School joined United Learning, which is a group of schools operating both in the independent and maintained sectors and which is, itself, a charitable trust dating back to the late 19th Century. The school operated exclusively from one site on Farnham Lane, Haslemere in Surrey, England. It had a foundation in Christianity.

In February 2025, the school announced that it was closing at the end of the current academic year. The estate, consisting of 24.36 acres of land with fifteen buildings of a total of 100,491 square feet, was for sale in April 2026 priced at £8 million..

== History ==
The original Royal Naval School was founded in 1840 as The Royal Female School for the daughters of Naval and Marine Officers, one of the earliest academic girls' schools in England. The other ancestor of the Royal School, the Grove School, Hindhead, was founded in the 1850s and was also a pioneer in girls' education. From the outset, the founders' ambition was for the girls to become independent.

=== The Royal Naval School ===
In 1815, the Battle of Waterloo finally put an end to the Napoleonic Wars. In the following peaceful years, the Royal Navy was put on half or even quarter pay. Peace also brought an end to the prize money from captured ships. The Navy had been at war nearly continuously since the 1770s, so that the potential for senior officers to become rich and to set themselves up as country gentlemen, had become established. The peace brought significant changes to their way of life. After Waterloo, many Naval Officers found themselves in financial difficulty. They could send their sons from the age of nine to sea as midshipmen, where they would gain an education and naval training. Their daughters, however, were in a more difficult position. They were too high up the social ladder to engage in any menial work to earn their own living, but too poor to attract the attention of eligible husbands. Vice-Admiral Sir Jahleel Brenton, Admiral Sir Thomas Williams and Captain the Hon. Francis Maude, established the Royal Naval Female School, as it was first known, for the daughters and sisters of Naval and Marine Officers, specifically to give them a sound education and enable them to gain employment, mostly as schoolteachers and governesses. Queen Victoria and the Queen Dowager, Queen Adelaide, were among the first subscribers, and from the outset the school had the patronage of the Queen.

In 1975, Princess Anne inherited the Presidency from her great-uncle, Lord Mountbatten of Burma, after whom the science and languages block is named. Princess Anne has visited the school, her most recent visit being for Prize Day in 2023. She opened the Princess Anne Sports Hall (P.A.S.H) in 1986. In 1989, the school’s Patron, Elizabeth II, opened the QEII Sixth Form building.

=== The Royal School ===
The two schools joined together in 1995. Children were educated at all ages up to 18 years, and there was also daycare for infants from the age of six weeks.

Elements of the school’s uniform had historical connections – the girls' suit jackets were cut short, in the naval style, and their tippets were as used at the funeral of Queen Alexandra in 1925.

In February 2025, the school announced that it was to close in June 2025, due to pupil numbers falling below 100, despite a capacity of 350. In February 2026, the buildings were listed for sale with an asking price of £8,000,000.

== Notable former pupils ==
=== Royal Naval School for Girls ===
- Victoria Schofield, author
