= Action of 24 October 1793 =

1793 battle of the War of the First Coalition

Coordinates: 47°02′00″N 07°22′00″W

- Part of the War of the First Coalition
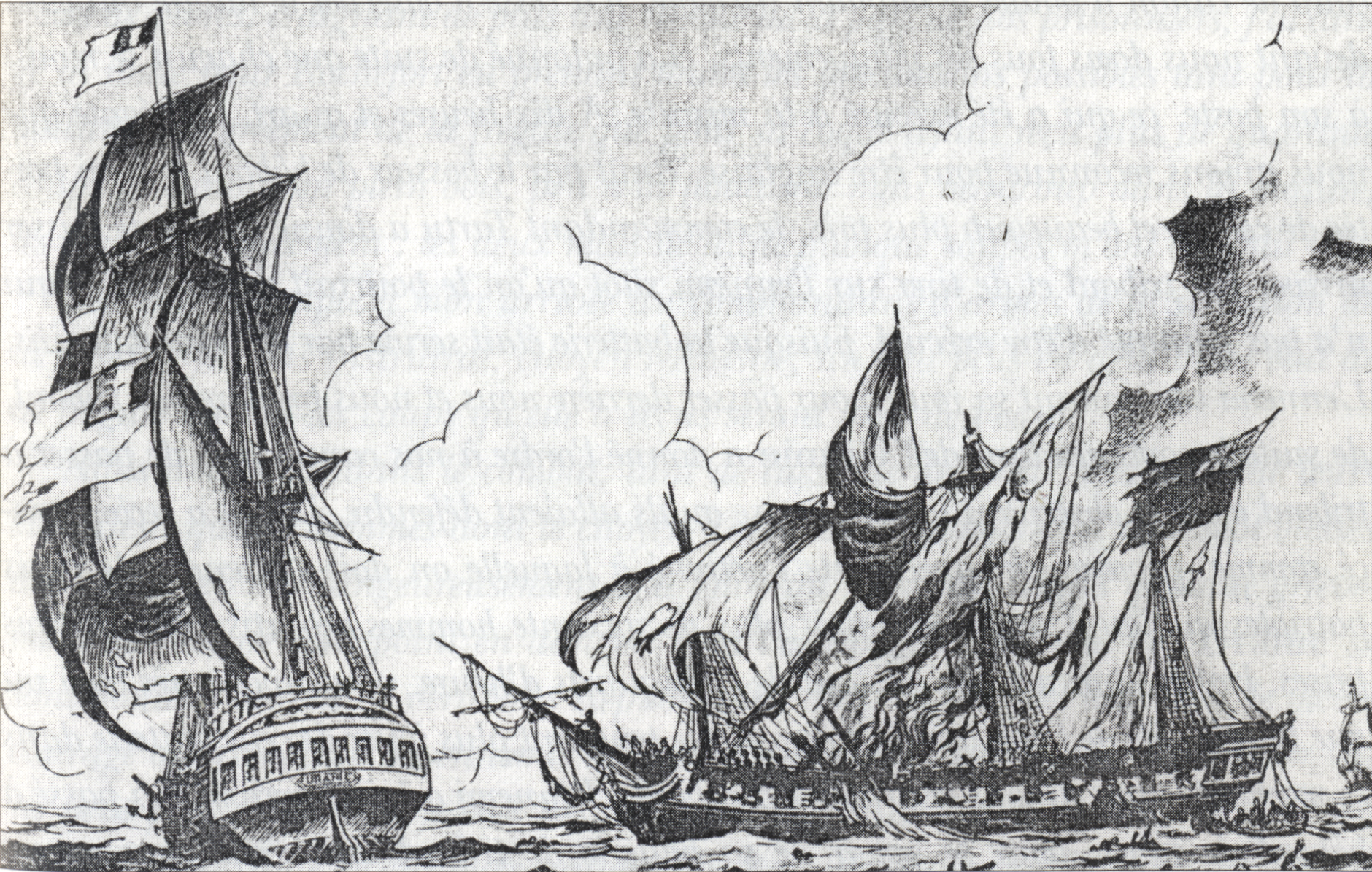
- Illustration of the action
Date	24 October 1793
Location	Bay of Biscay, Atlantic Ocean
Result	French victory

Belligerents
France	Great Britain

Commanders and leaders
Jean-François Tartu †; Zacharie Allemand	James Cotes

Strength
4 frigates 1 brig	1 frigate

Casualties and losses
4 killed 7 wounded	13 killed 21 wounded 1 frigate captured

The action of 24 October 1793 was fought during the War of the First Coalition. While cruising in the Northern Bay of Biscay, the Royal Navy frigate HMS Thames, under Captain James Cotes, encountered the much larger French frigate Uranie, under Captain Jean-François Tartu. The ships engaged, with each suffering severe damage until they separated after nearly four hours of continual combat. Cotes ordered his crew to make hasty repairs, intending to resume the battle, but Uranie's crew, with their captain dead, slipped away while Thames was unable to manoeuvre. At 16:00, with repairs on Thames ongoing, a French squadron of three frigates and a brig, under Captain Zacharie Allemand, arrived, firing on Thames as they approached. Outnumbered, Cotes surrendered his ship to Allemand, who commended Cotes on his resistance to the far larger Uranie.

The French brought Thames into Brest, where sailors from Allemand's squadron looted the frigate. The British officers were imprisoned for the next two years. The frigate was commissioned into the French Navy as Tamise, and Uranie was renamed Tartu in honour of her deceased captain. Both vessels then served with the French Atlantic Fleet, Tamise until 8 June 1796, when the British recaptured her off the Scilly Isles, and Tartu until 30 December 1796 when the British captured her during the Expédition d'Irlande.

== Background ==
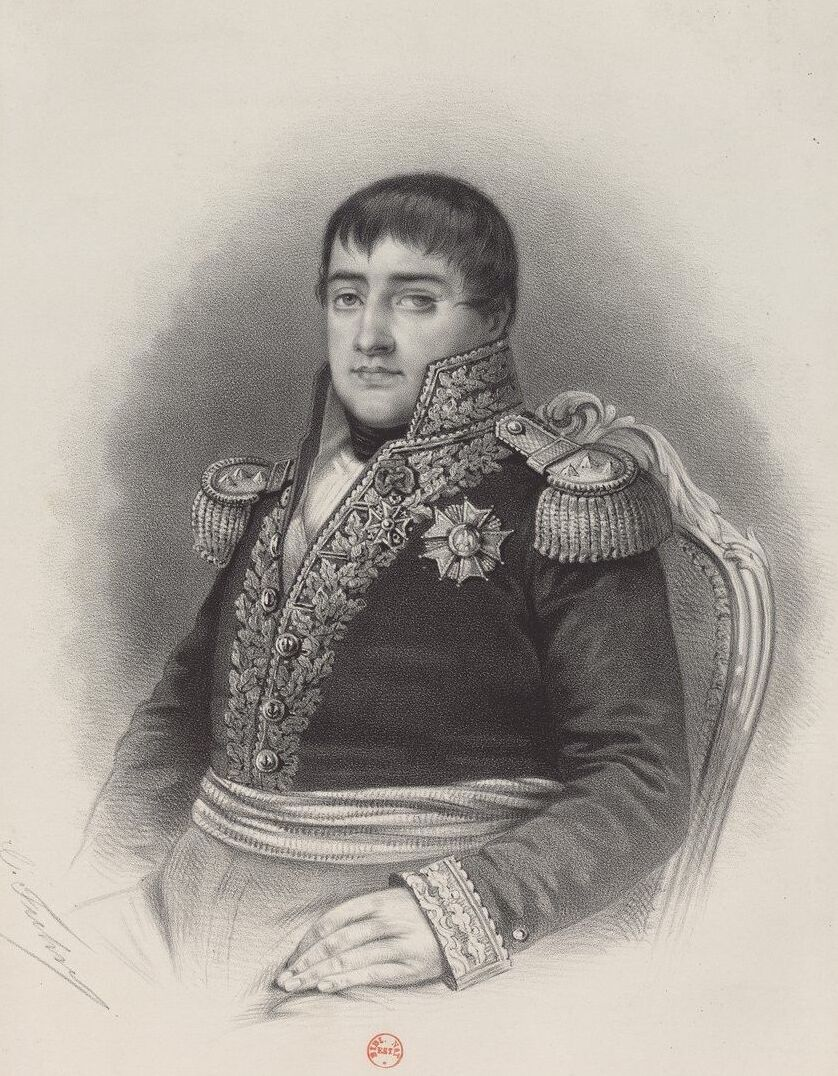
Zacharie Allemand, the French commander at the action

On 1 February 1793, amid deteriorating Anglo-French relations, the French First Republic declared war on Great Britain, bringing the British into the War of the First Coalition. At sea, the Bay of Biscay, Western Approaches and English Channel all became areas of significant naval activity as French privateers sailed on raiding cruises against British merchant shipping. To augment these attacks, the French naval authorities dispatched squadrons of frigates to attack British trade routes. To counter these operations, the Royal Navy sent their own frigates to sea, sometimes in squadrons and sometimes on single patrols.

A French frigate squadron was sent to cruise in the Northern Bay of Biscay in the early autumn of 1793, commanded by Captain Zacharie Allemand and consisting of the frigates Carmagnole, Résolue, Sémillante and Uranie with the brig-corvette Espiègle. On 22 October, the squadron sighted the 16-gun Spanish brig Alcoudia and Allemand ordered Uranie under Captain Jean-François Tartu to separate from the squadron and pursue the Spaniard. Uranie was easily able to capture Alcoudia, taking the prisoners on board the frigate and establishing a prize crew on the brig. Two days later, Uranie was sailing southwards in company with the prize with the wind at the southwest, when a sail appeared to the north at 09:30.

The new arrival was a British ship sent from the Channel Fleet on a lone patrol: the frigate HMS Thames under Captain James Cotes. Thames was an old frigate, built in 1758 and carrying 32 12-pounder guns. The ship was below its standard complement of 215 men, sailing with only 184, which meant that the 6-pounder guns that augmented the main battery could not be manned. By comparison, Uranie was five years old and carried 40 18-pounder guns and weighing almost double the weight of the British ship. Her full complement was of 260 men, but she lacked 60 of her sailors, dispatched in prize crews over three captured ships, and was burdened with over 260 prisoners. At first unsure of the identity of the ship to the north, Tartu hoisted a blue flag as an identification signal and sent the Alcoudia away in case the ship should be revealed to be hostile. Cotes did not respond to the signal, and the two ships were soon hidden from one another by a rain squall.

== Action ==
At 10:15 the weather cleared, leaving both frigates well in sight of one another, both Tartu and Cotes identifying the opposing ship as an enemy and clearing for action, Tartu hoisting the French tricolour. With both captains determined on battle, the frigates approached one another rapidly on opposing tacks. Uranie was the first to fire, discharging a full broadside at Thames and then wearing around to pull alongside Thames on the same tack. The manoeuvre placed the two frigates directly alongside one another and a close engagement began, each discharging broadside after broadside at the other. At 12:15, a round shot swept Uranie's quarterdeck, killing a helmsman, cutting a boy in half, wounding another, and severing Tartu's leg under the knee; Tartu was brought below deck and Lieutenant Wuibert assumed command of Uranie. The fight continued in this manner for several hours, until 14:20, when Uranie was able to pull ahead of Thames and fire several broadsides into the bows of the British ship, raking her. British historian William James recorded that the crew of Uranie then attempted to board via the starboard bow of Thames, but were driven off by fire from Cotes' bow guns, which had been double–shotted for this reason. However the after action report by Lieutenant Wuibert on Uranie states that no boarding action was attempted.

With the boarding attempt thwarted Uranie pulled back, turning southwards to put distance between the vessels. Tartu, brought below deck and dying, had ordered a retreat for fear that his prisoners would revolt and because the engagement was drifiting in the east-north-east direction, where two sails, assumed to be British warships, had been sighted. It was assumed on Thames that the French ship was retreating, the British crew cheering as the firing ceased. Cotes however anticipated a resumption of the action and ordered his men to begin making repairs immediately: Thames was so badly damaged that pursuit was out of the question. All three of Thames' masts had been shot through, most of the rigging had been torn away, the hull and decks were badly damaged and 34 men were killed or wounded. Uranie was in a similar state, and hauled up approximately 2 nautical miles (3.7 km) away, the masts intact but damaged with most of the rigging shot through and numerous holes smashed through the hull. It was also evident on Thames that the crew of the French ship were pumping water over the side, an indication that the ship had been damaged below the waterline.

Cotes' ship was fit only to sail with the wind, and the captain urged his men to make greater efforts to repair their ship before Uranie could come up with them again. So engrossed was the British crew with their repairs that it was not until 16:00 that it was realised that the French frigate was no longer holding station within sight, and had completely disappeared. This led some on the British ship to assume that Uranie had sunk, although in fact the ship had simply turned away in an effort to make it back to Rochefort to repair the damage suffered in the engagement. Also apparent were a number of sails in the distance. These rapidly approached and were revealed to be a frigate squadron flying the Union Flag. Cotes was unable to manoeuvre his ship or respond to the new arrivals, which were soon identified as French vessels wearing false flags. The leading frigate pulled up close to Thames and fired a broadside at the British frigate. Cotes immediately hailed the French, announcing that he was in no position to fight them due to the damage his ship had suffered and that he was striking his flag.

== Aftermath ==
Allemand requested that Cotes come aboard Carmagnole, but Cotes responded that he was unable to do so as his ship's boats had all been destroyed. Allemand sent a boat from his own ship to Thames and brought Cotes to Carmagnole as a prisoner of war; Cotes used the delay to destroy his ship's documents. Allemand questioned Cotes intently about the nature of his recent combat and, on identifying Uranie as one of his own squadron, commented that Tartu should have defeated Thames in half the time the action had taken.

Thames subsequently returned to Brest with Allemand's squadron on 25 October, although the British ship was thoroughly looted during the journey by the French sailors, whose officers were unable to exert any control over them. The ship's officers had been removed, including the surgeon, and therefore the British wounded did not receive medical treatment until the squadron arrived at Brest on 25 October; two subsequently died, making the total British deaths 13, with 21 wounded. Cotes wrote a report on the engagement, which he sent to the Admiralty from captivity in Gisors, which the French authorities intercepted and delayed, with the result that the first news of Thames' fate did not arrive in Britain until 7 May 1794. Cotes was soon afterwards exchanged and returned to Britain, where a court-martial investigating the loss of Thames exonerated him. Several of his officers were not repatriated however, remaining in French captivity for the next two years.

Ship plan of Tartu made after her capture on 30 December 1796

Uranie lost four killed, including Captain Tartu, and seven wounded, including three seriously, and the frigate arrived at Rochefort soon afterwards, where in honour of the captain's death, she was renamed Tartu. It was subsequently incorrectly reported in Britain that the ship's name was changed to Tortue (tortoise) to disguise its identity after being defeated by Thames. Thames was taken into French service as Tamise, and participated in the Atlantic campaign of May 1794 the following year. The French lost both frigates in 1796. HMS Santa Margarita recaptured Tamise in an engagement near the Scilly Isles between British and French frigate squadrons at the action of 8 June 1796. Some six months later, the ship of the line HMS Polyphemus captured Tartu on 30 December in the aftermath of the disastrous Expédition d'Irlande.

== Bibliography ==
- Brenton, Edward Pelham (1837) [1825]. The Naval History of Great Britain, Vol. I. London: C. Rice. "edward pelham brenton."
- Clowes, William Laird (1997) [1900]. The Royal Navy, A History from the Earliest Times to 1900, Volume IV. London: Chatham Publishing. ISBN 1-86176-013-2.
- Granier, Hubert (1998). Histoire des Marins français 1789-1815. illustrations by Alain Coz. Marines éditions. ISBN 2-909675-41-6.
- Henderson CBE, James (1994) [1970]. The Frigates. Leo Cooper. ISBN 0-85052-432-6.
- James, William (2002) [1827]. The Naval History of Great Britain, Volume 1, 1793–1796. London: Conway Maritime Press. ISBN 0-85177-905-0.
- Woodman, Richard (2001). The Sea Warriors. Constable Publishers. ISBN 1-84119-183-3.
