= HMS Thames (1758) =

Richmond-class frigate of the Royal Navy

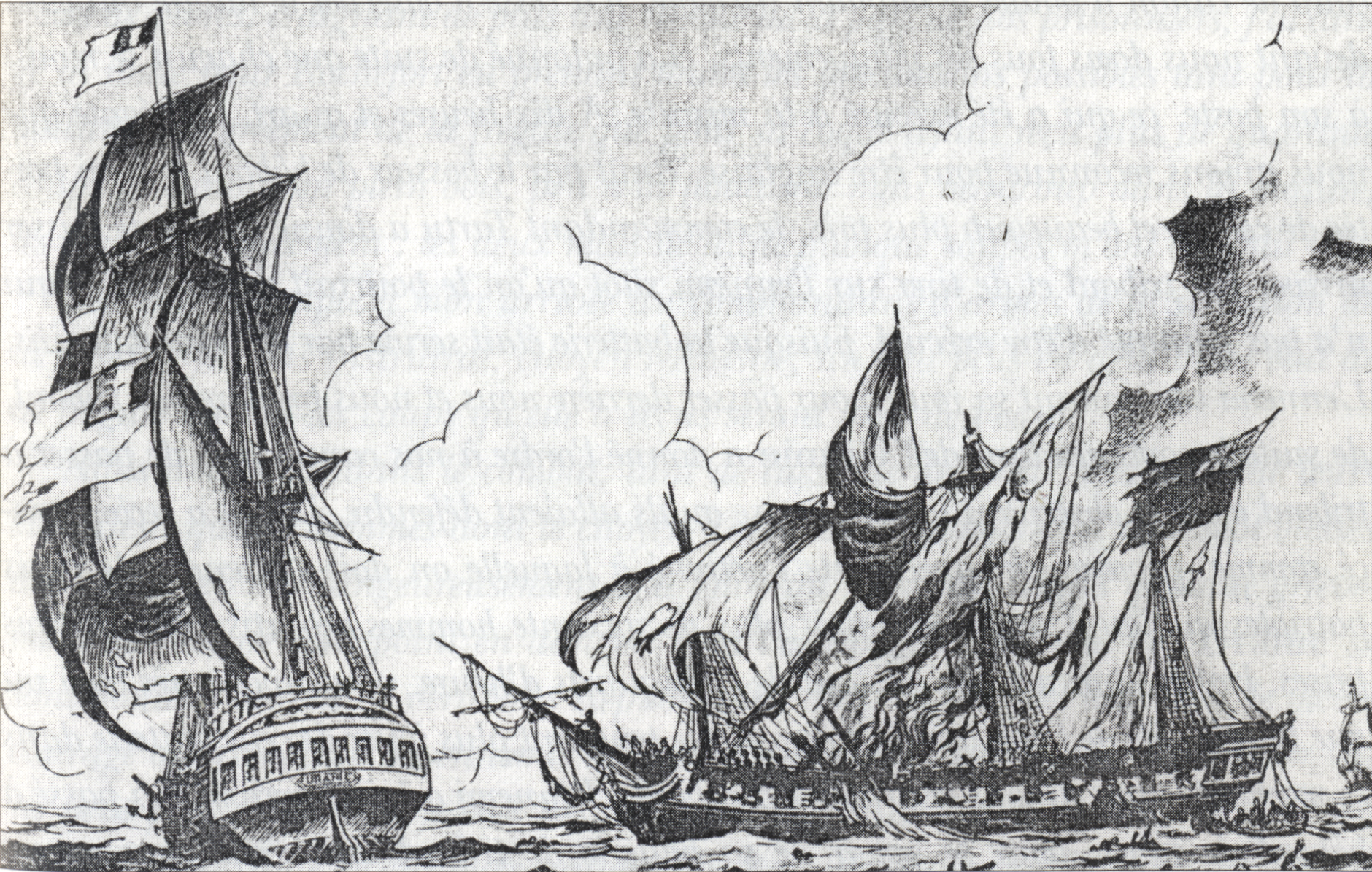
- Thames (right) at the action of 24 October 1793

History

Great Britain
- Name: HMS Thames
- Ordered: 11 January 1757
- Builder: Henry Adams, Bucklers Hard
- Laid down: February 1757
- Launched: 10 April 1758
- Completed: 29 May 1758 at Portsmouth Dockyard
- Commissioned: April 1758
- Captured: 25 October 1793

France
- Name: Tamise
- Acquired: 25 October 1793
- Captured: 8 June 1796

Great Britain
- Name: HMS Thames
- Acquired: 8 June 1796 (recaptured)
- Commissioned: December 1796
- Fate: Taken to pieces at Woolwich September 1803

General characteristics
- Class & type: Richmond-class fifth-rate frigate
- Tons burthen: 65646/94 bm
- Length: 127 ft 0 in (38.7 m) (gundeck); 104 ft 8 1/2 in (31.9 m) (keel)
- Beam: 34 ft 4 in (10.5 m)
- Depth of hold: 11 ft 9 in (3.6 m)
- Sail plan: Full-rigged ship
- Complement: 210 officers and men
- Armament: Upperdeck: 26 × 12-pounder guns; QD: 4 × 6-pounder guns; Fc: 2 × 6-pounder guns; Additionally after 1794: QD: 4 × 24-pounder carronades; Fc: 2 × 24-pounder carronades

HMS Thames was a 32-gun Richmond-class fifth-rate frigate of the Royal Navy built by Henry Adams and launched at Bucklers Hard in 1758. She served in several wars, including for some four years in French service (as Tamise) after her capture. She was recaptured in 1796 and was broken up in 1803.

== British service ==
Thames was commissioned in April 1758. On 30 July, Thames encountered the 30-gun French frigate Rose, under Sade de Vaudronne. In the ensuing battle, Sade beached Rose and scuttled her by fire to prevent her falling into British hands. Triton rescued Sade and his crew. On 18 May 1759, Thames assisted in the capture of the French frigate Aréthuse, which the Royal Navy commissioned as HMS Arethusa.

Thames captured the privateer Bien Aimé on 26 September 1760.

Thames was deployed in the Mediterranean from August 1763 and paid off in March 1766 after wartime service.

She was repaired and recommissioned in October 1770 for the Falkland Islands dispute. She participated in the Spithead Review of 22 June 1773, and in a mission to Morocco in 1774. Paid off in July 1775, she was recommissioned in August 1776, and then paid off again in September 1782 after wartime service.

After several repairs at various times, she was recommissioned under Captain Thomas Troubridge in June 1790. The China fleet left Macao on 21 March. HMS Leopard and Thames escorted them as far as Java Head.

She was later again paid off, repaired, and refitted.

== Capture ==
At the action of 24 October 1793, while sailing to Gibraltar under Captain James Cotes, she met Jean-François Tartu's Uranie, off Gascony. In the ensuing engagement she lost her rigging and most of her starboard battery, yet killed Tartu and forced Uranie to disengage. The next day the frigate Carmagnole, under Zacharie Allemand, and accompanying vessels captured Thames, which was essentially a defenseless hulk. She was brought into French service as Tamise. (Note: Caramagnole was a 42-gun Hébé-class frigate.)

== French service and recapture ==
Tamise was entrusted to Captain Jean-Marthe-Adrien l'Hermite, who ordered some technical improvements. She went for two short cruises in the Channel where she succeeded in taking 22 British merchant vessels of various sizes. She also escaped a British squadron that ignored her because of her British construction lines. She was then the admiral's frigate, repeating orders, in Villaret de Joyeuse's fleet. She was charged with the reconnaissance of Lord Howe's fleet in the morning of the Glorious First of June 1794.

Under the command of Captain Fradin, Tamise took part in the disastrous campaign of "Grand Hiver" while still with Villaret Joyeuse's fleet. She also was sent on three individual chasing campaigns making several seizures and taking part in three inconclusive individual fights.

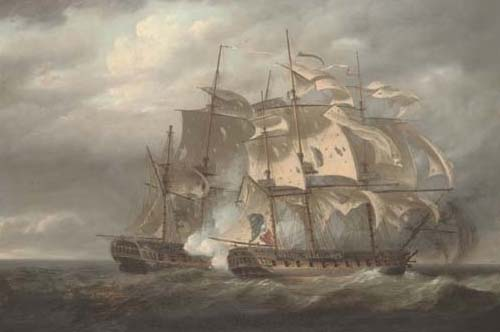
The capture of the French Frigate Tamise by Santa Margarita, under the command of Captain T. Byam Martin, off the Scilly Isles, 8 June 1796. Nicholas Pocock

On 8 June 1796 Tamise was cruising with the Tribune in the approaches to the Channel when they encountered the British frigates, Santa Margarita and Unicorn, which chased the two French frigates. Unicorn captured Tribune, and Santa Margarita captured Tamise at the action of 8 June 1796. The Royal Navy reinstated Tamise under her old name as HMS Thames.

== British service again ==
Thames was recommissioned in December 1796 under Captain William Lukin and in June sailed for Jamaica. In April–May 1797 she was caught up in the Spithead and Nore mutinies. However, Lukin managed her well during this period and she was one of the first vessels to sail after the suppression of the mutiny. In the second half of 1797, Thames captured a small barge of one gun, name unknown, on the Jamaica station.

On 16 January 1801, Thames recaptured Eliza, Brown, master, which the French privateer Uncle Thomas had captured. Thames sent Eliza into Plymouth.

On 12 May 1800, Thames, Clyde and the hired armed cutter Suwarrow captured a French chasse maree, name unknown. On 1 June, Thames was a part of a squadron detached from Channel fleet to Quiberon Bay and the Morbihan. On 4 June Thames, Cynthia and some smaller vessels attacked the south-west end of Quiberon where the silenced the forts, which a landing party of troops later destroyed.

On 26 October Thames encountered a French privateer at about 9:30 in the morning. Thames pursued her quarry for five hours. During the pursuit they came upon Immortalite, which joined in. The two British vessels finally captured the ship Diable à Quatre some 36 leagues (170 km) from the Cordouan lighthouse. She was armed with sixteen 6 and 12-pounder guns and had a crew of 150 men. She was only one day out of Bordeaux. The Royal Navy took her into service as Imogen.

On 26 or 29 October, Thames and Immortalite chased a French letter of marque schooner all day. They finally captured her and found that she had been sailing from Guadaloupe to Bordeaux with a cargo of coffee. She was the schooner Unique.

A little over a month later, on 30 November she captured another French privateer in the Bay of Biscay after a six-hour pursuit. The prize, Actif, was armed with fourteen 6-pounder and two brass 12-pounder guns. She had a crew of 137 men and this was the first day of her first cruise. From her, Captain Lukin learned that in the previous three months only two British prizes had come into French or Spanish ports, one into Rochelle and one into Passage. The Royal Navy trook Actif into service as Morgiana.

On 18 January 1801, Thames captured the French navy corvette Aurore in the English Channel. Aurore was armed with 16 guns and was under the command of Lieutenant de vaisseau Charles Girault. She had as a passenger the governor of Mauritius's Aide de Camp, who was carrying dispatches to the French government there. The Royal Navy took Aurore into service as HMS Charwell.

Captain Aiskew Paffard Hollis took command of Thames in June. On 5 July she became becalmed while trying to recall Superb to join the squadron under Rear Admiral Sir James Saumarez. On 8 July she observed a Franco-Spanish squadron of six sail of the line prepare to sail the next day for Algeciras, and sailed to Gibraltar to warn the admiral.

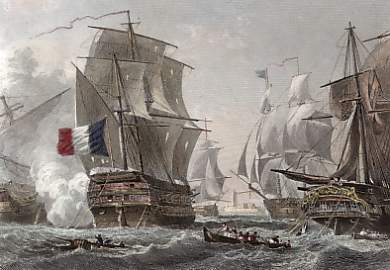
Fine deed of arms by Captain Troude, Antoine Léon Morel-Fatio. Thames is in the right foreground.

Three days later Thames was part of Saumarez's squadron, which left Gibraltar to chase a Franco-Spanish squadron observed sailing from Algeciras. Thames took a minor part in the subsequent Battle of Algeciras Bay. The engagement resulted in the destruction of two first rates, and the capture of a third rate.

In subsequent months, assisted by the sloop-of-war Calpe, which had also participated in the battle, she destroyed a number of the enemy's coasters in the bay of Estepona.

== Fate ==
Thames was paid off in January 1803 and broken up at Woolwich in September.

== See also ==
- List of ships captured in the 18th century
