= Zacharie Allemand =

French Navy officer (1762–1826)

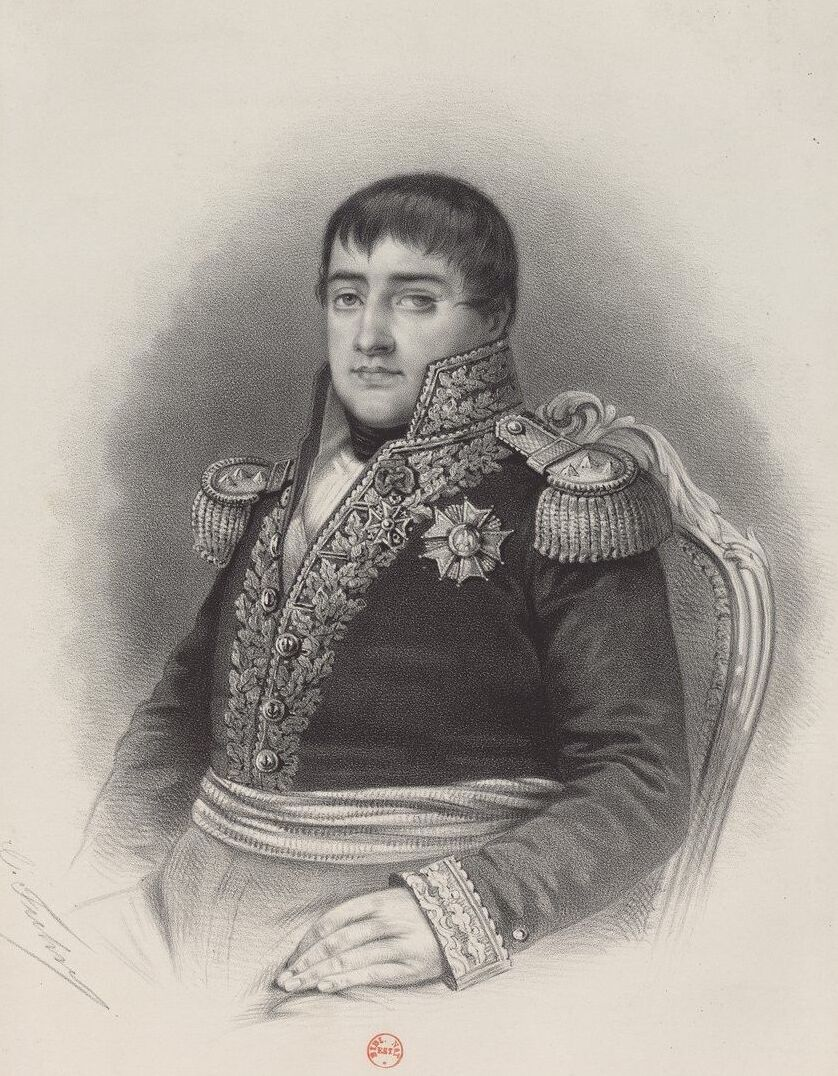
- Portrait of Allemand
- Born: 1 May 1762; Port-Louis, Morbihan
- Died: 2 March 1828 (aged 65); Toulon, France
- Military career
- Allegiance: Kingdom of France; French First Republic; First French Empire
- Branch: French Navy; French Imperial Navy
- Service years: 1778–1813
- Rank: Vice admiral
- Conflicts: American Revolutionary War; Battle of Sadras; Battle of Providien; Battle of Negapatam (1782); Battle of Trincomalee; Battle of Cuddalore (1783); French Revolutionary Wars; Action of 24 October 1793; Battle of Genoa (1795); Cruise of Bruix; Napoleonic Wars; Allemand's expedition of 1805; Battle of the Basque Roads
- Awards: Legion of Honour; Order of Saint Louis

Vice-Admiral Zacharie Jacques Théodore, comte Allemand (1 May 1762 – 2 March 1826) was a French Navy officer who served in the French Revolutionary and Napoleonic Wars.

== Early life ==
Zacharie Allemand was born on 1 May 1762 in Port-Louis, Morbihan. His father was a sea captain of the French Indies Company. Orphaned at an early age, Allemand started his career at sea at the age of 12 as an apprentice on the East Indiaman Superbe. In 1778, following France's entry into the American Revolutionary War, he voluntarily joined the French Navy and was sent to serve on the ship of the line Sévère, serving under Suffren in the Indian Ocean and participating in the battles of Sadras, Providien, Negapatam, Trincomalee and Cuddalore. By the end of the war, Allemand had risen to frigate lieutenant and served on Annibal. He later went on to serve on the fluyts Baleine and Outarde in the Indian Ocean.

In late 1786, Allemand returned to France to benefit from a reform of the Navy by which he could obtain a permanent commission of sous-lieutenant de vaisseau for his service. In this capacity, he served on a number of frigates in the Caribbean and off America.

== French Republic and Empire ==
Allemand was promoted to full lieutenant in 1792, and had risen to ship-of-the-line captain by the outbreak of the War of the First Coalition in 1793. He was given command of a light squadron, with his flag on the frigate Carmagnole. Engaging in commerce raiding, at the action of 24 October 1793 he captured the frigate Thames, helpless after her fight against Uranie. As this was the first British warship the French captured during the war, Allemand was heralded as a hero by the National Convention. In 1794, Allemand was given command of the 74-gun Duquesne and carried out raids against British commerce outposts in Sierra Leone and Guinea, capturing 21 merchantmen. After returning to the Mediterranean, Allemand was incorporated in Admiral Pierre Martin's squadron. Martin and Allemand disliked each other, and their relations soured to the point where Allemand was nearly relieved of duty for insubordination after the Battle of Genoa.

Promoted to chef de division Allemand took command of a division in Joseph de Richery's squadron. He was sent with two ships of the line and one frigate to raid British outposts in Labrador, and on his way back captured a British convoy worth 80 million francs, returning to Brest in November 1796. Upon his arrival, Allemand was relieved of duty for "brutality towards his crews" and "rudeness towards his passengers". Reinstated, Allemand took command of the 74-gun Tyrannicide and took part in the Cruise of Bruix. On 11 July 1799, Bruix was replaced by Louis-René Levassor de Latouche Tréville, who again relieved Allemand from duty for "rudeness" in 1800. The next year, Allemand commanded the Aigle. After serving in office duties in 1802, Allemand received command of the Magnanime, in Admiral Édouard Thomas Burgues de Missiessy's squadron, on which he departed on 11 January 1805 for the Antilles as part of Missiessy's expedition. Upon the return of the squadron to Rochefort, Missiessy was disgraced and fell ill, giving effective command to Allemand.

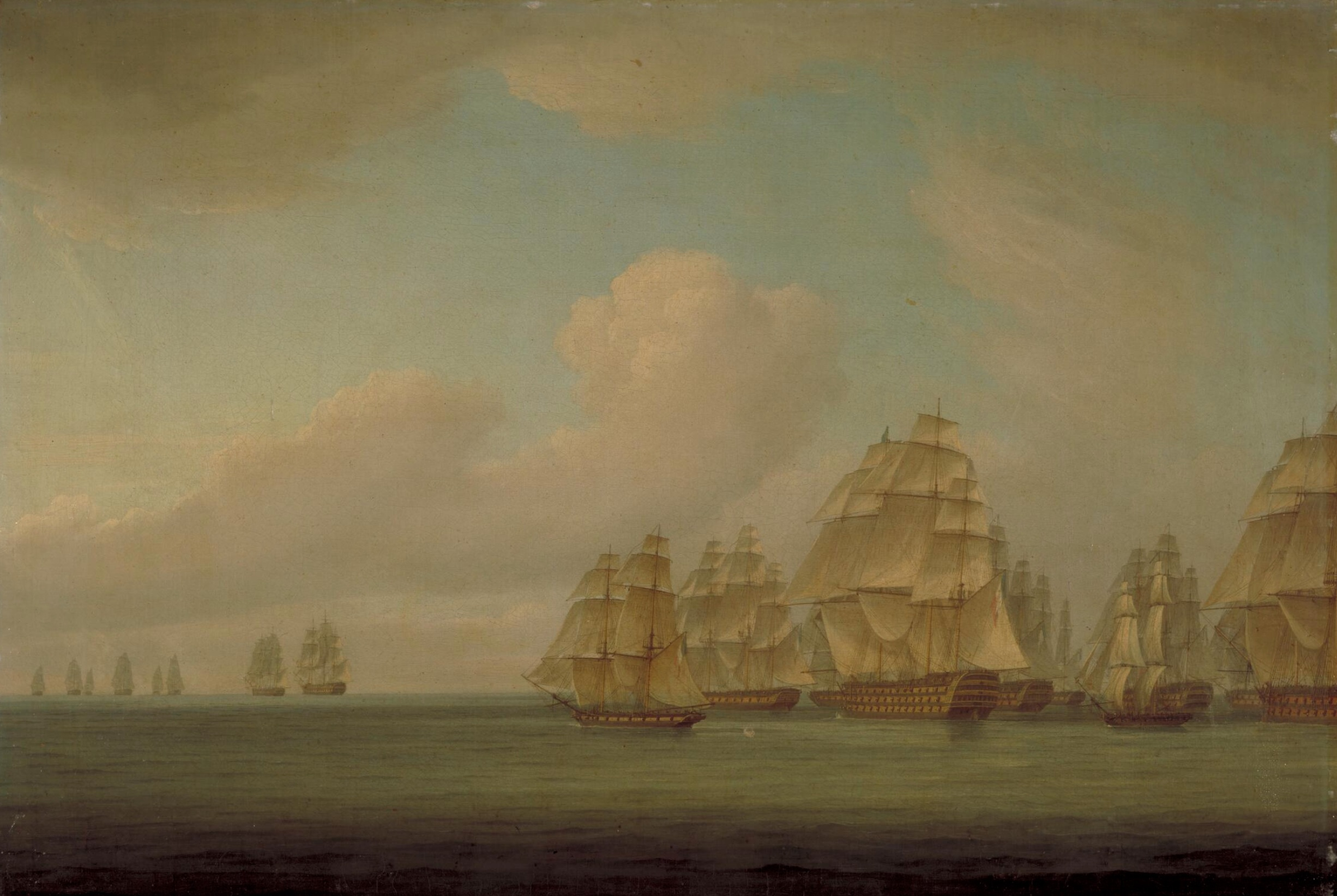
Allemand's squadron pursuing a British convoy on 25 September 1805

On 22 June, Allemand was officially made chief of the squadron, and tasked with a diversion manoeuver that would bring him to rejoin Villeneuve's squadron in Ferrol: Allemand's expedition of 1805 was a vast commerce raid that led to the capture of 43 British merchantmen, the sloop-of-war HMS Ranger, the hired armed cutter Dove and the 56-gun HMS Calcutta. Allemand eluded three British squadrons sent to capture him, earning his division the nickname of "invisible squadron". This success earned Allemand the consideration of Napoleon, in spite of severe notations from Denis Decrès criticising his character. He was promoted to counter admiral on 1 January 1806.

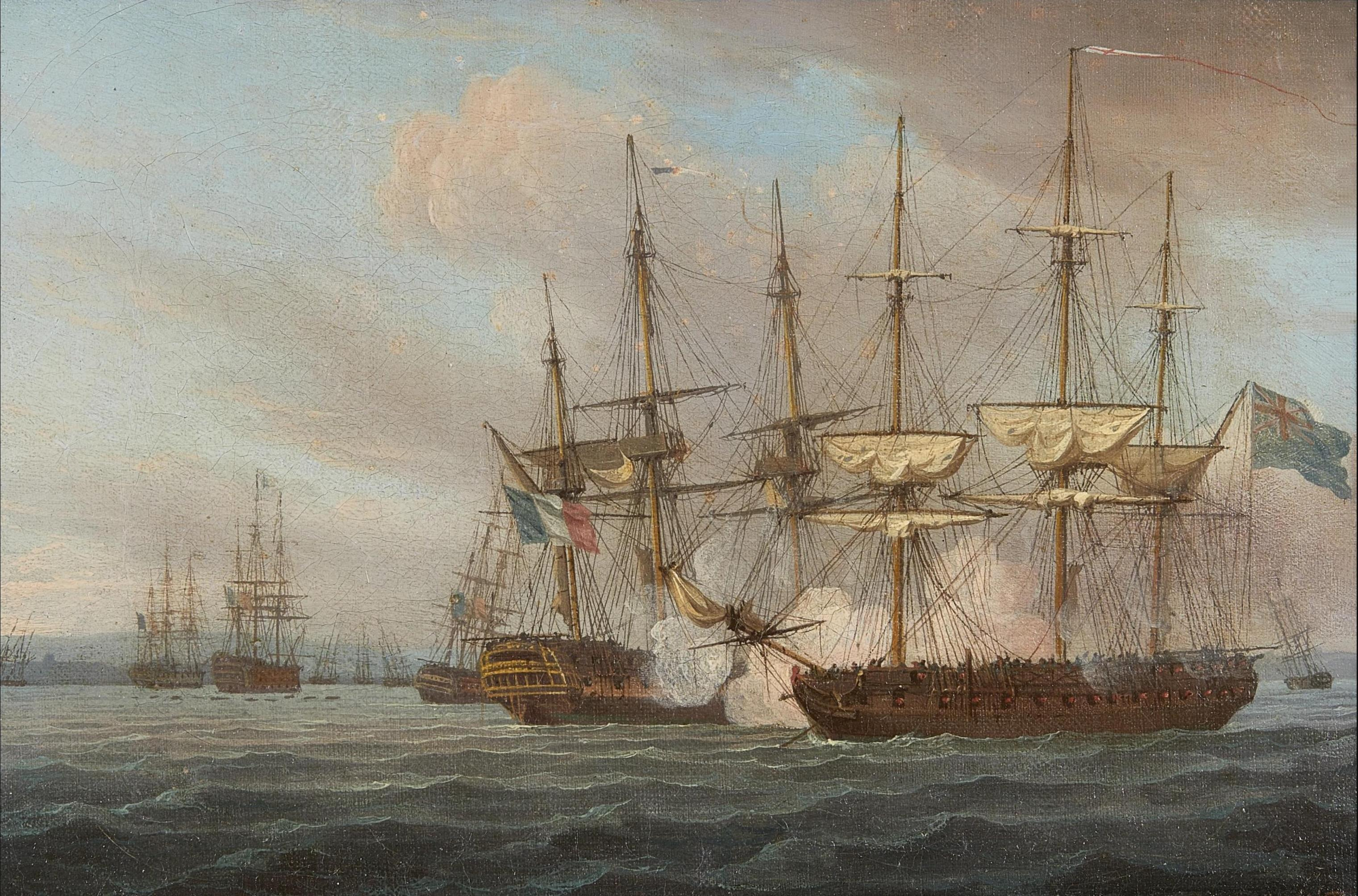
The Battle of the Basque Roads, where Allemand suffered a major defeat

By 1809, Allemand was vice-admiral and commanded the French squadrons in Brest and Rochefort. His insufficient defensive dispositions allowed the British to launch a fireship attack on his squadron at anchor on 12 April, starting the Battle of the Basque Roads. Allemand reacted to the attack merely by giving his captains their liberty of manoeuver and concentrating on the safety of his own ship, the 120-gun Océan, which sailed to the haven of the river Charente after throwing several guns overboard. The resulting loss of four French ships of the line and one frigate was blamed on their captains, four of whom were court-martialed with one relieved of duty and one executed by firing squad, but Allemand's role was never questioned, much to the outrage of the officers. Allemand was quickly transferred to the command of the Mediterranean fleet to prevent possibility of his hearing by the court of Rochefort.

On 15 August 1810, he was made a Count of the Empire. In Toulon, Allemand commanded a squadron that remained at anchor until the end of the Empire. He engaged in a number of rows, fights and even brawls with his officers, and having very bad relations with the maritime prefect Maxime Julien Émeriau de Beauverger. In 1812, Allemand succeeded in bringing several warships from Lorient where they were trapped to Brest in order to form a larger French fleet. In 1813, Allemand was made aid to Missiessy in Flessingue, but violently refused the office, arguing that he could now serve only as chief commander. This last outburst led to his disgrace and he was forcibly retired.

== Bourbon Restoration and death ==
Allemand attempted to return to Navy service during the Bourbon Restoration in France, but to no avail. In May 1814, he was made a member of the Académie des Sciences, which he presided from August. In June, he was made a Knight of the Order of Saint Louis. During the Hundred Days, in March 1815, Allemand offered his services to Napoleon, but Decrès refused to reinstate him. Allemand was the only senior officer to be thus rebuked.

In the following years, Allemand devoted his efforts to Freemasonry, creating an ephemeral dissident Order named "Suprême Conseil du Prado", of which he proclaimed himself "Souverain Grand Commandeur" Allemand died in Toulon on 2 March 1826.
