= French frigate Uranie (1788) =

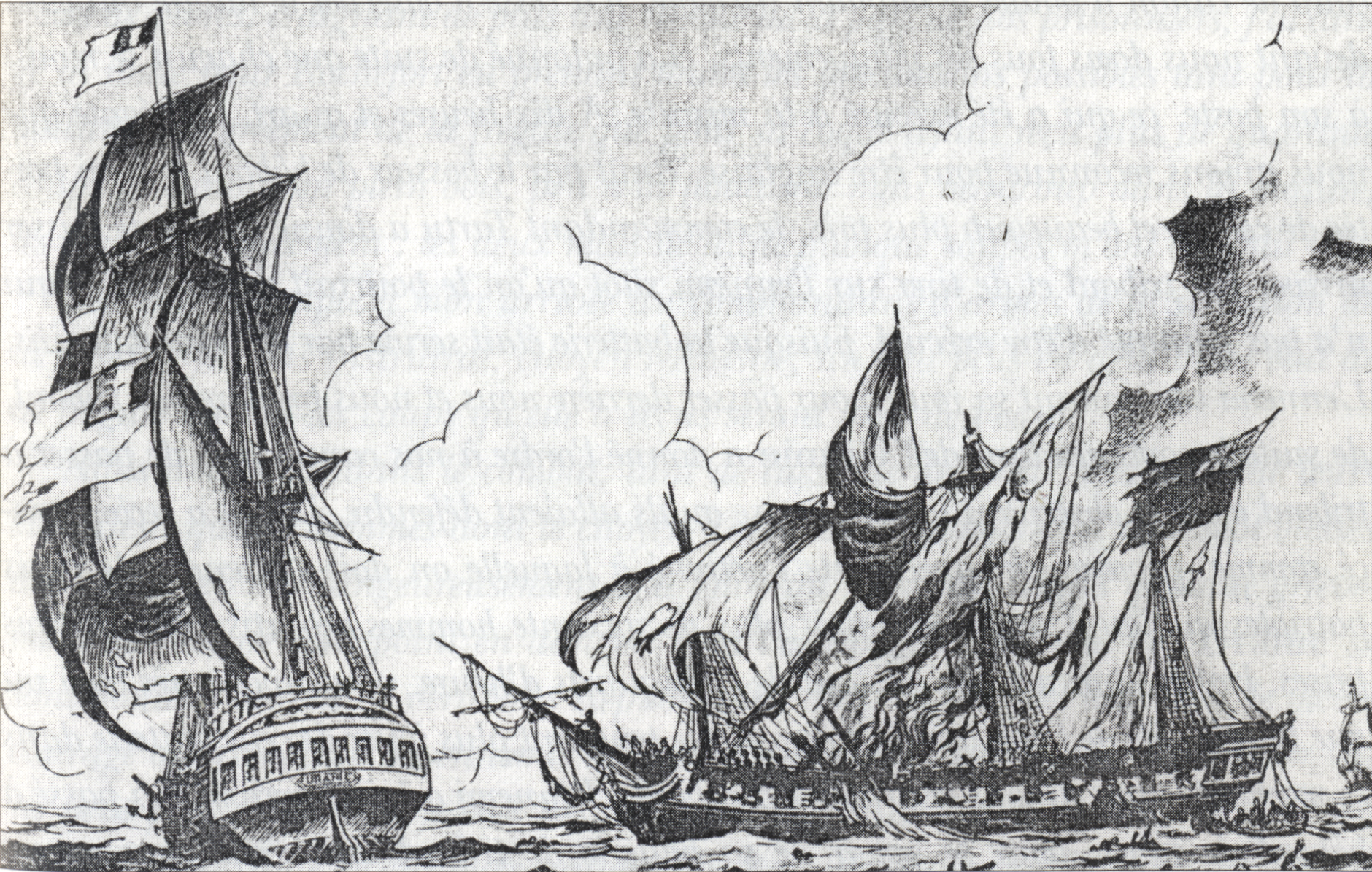
- Uranie (left) at the action of 24 October 1793

History

France
- Name: Uranie
- Namesake: Urania; Jean-François Tartu
- Launched: 31 October 1788
- Renamed: Tartu
- Captured: 5 January 1797

Great Britain
- Name: Uranie
- Acquired: 5 January 1797
- Out of service: 1807
- Fate: Sold October 1807

General characteristics
- Displacement: 1400 tonneaux
- Tons burthen: 700 port tonneaux
- Sail plan: Full-rigged ship
- Armament: 40 × 18-pounder guns

Uranie, drawn in 1797 soon after her capture by the British

Uranie was a frigate of the French Navy launched in 1788. She took part in a frigate action in 1793, capturing HMS Thames, and was renamed Tartu in honour of her captain, Jean-François Tartu, who was killed in the action. The Royal Navy captured her in 1797. She served as HMS Uranie until the Royal Navy sold her in 1807.

== French service ==
At the action of 24 October 1793, under Jean-François Tartu, she engaged HMS Thames, which she reduced to a hulk before disengaging. Tartu was killed; he was hailed as a hero, and Uranie was renamed Tartu in his honour.

== British service ==
On 5 January 1797, she was captured by HMS Polyphemus, and subsequently brought into British service as HMS Uranie. On 28 July 1800, Uranie captured the French privateer schooner Revanche, which was armed with fourteen 6-pounder guns and had a crew of 80 men. Revanche was 19 days out of Vigo and had already captured and sent in the English brig Marcus, a Portuguese ship, and a Spanish brig that had been a prize to Minerve. Sirius shared in the capture.

On 1 September 1804 Bess, Grantham, master, foundered at sea. Uranie saved the crew and a small part of the cargo. In 1807, she detected Manche, but failed to engage. Complaints by her crew led to the court martial of the captain for "failure to do his utmost to bring the enemy's frigate to action".
