= HMS Tribune (1796) =

Frigate of the Royal Navy

Coordinates: 44°33′59.2″N 63°33′11.7″W

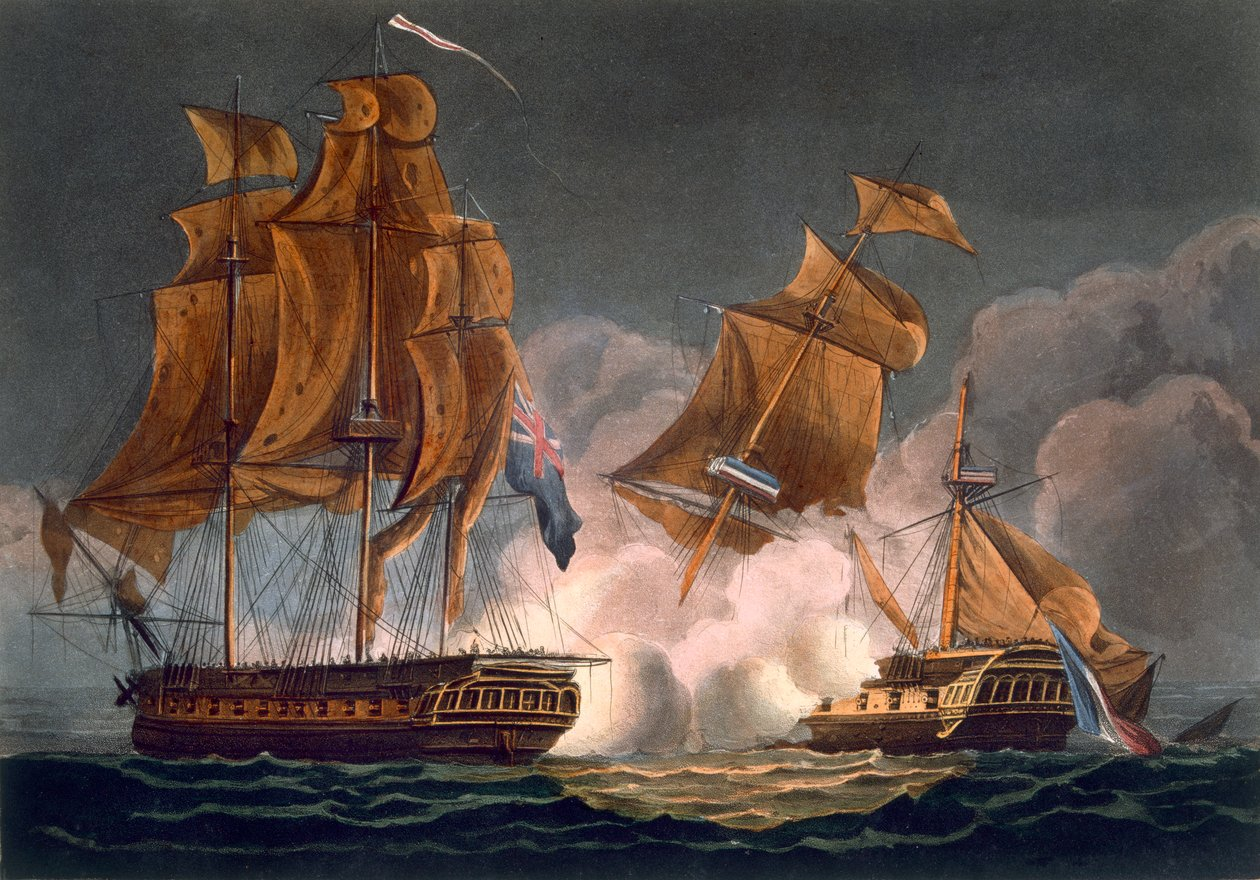
- Capture of La Tribune June 8th 1796, Thomas Whitcombe

History

France
- Name: Charente Inférieure, renamed to Tribune
- Builder: Rochefort
- Launched: 1793

Great Britain
- Name: HMS Tribune
- Acquired: Captured from the French on 8 June 1796
- Fate: Wrecked on 16 November 1797, or 23 November, at Halifax, Nova Scotia, after running onto Thrum Cap shoal

General characteristics
- Class & type: 36-gun fifth-rate frigate
- Displacement: 1,150 tonneaux
- Tons burthen: 600 port tonneaux; 91634/94 (bm)
- Length: 143 ft 7 1/2 in (43.8 m) (overall); 119 ft 0 5/8 in (36.3 m)
- Beam: 38 ft 0 1/2 in (11.6 m)
- Depth of hold: 11 ft 6 1/2 in (3.5 m)
- Sail plan: Full-rigged ship
- Complement: 244
- Armament: Upper deck: 26 × 12-pounder guns; QD: 6 × 6-pounder guns; Fc: 2 × 6-pounder guns

HMS Tribune was a Royal Navy 36-gun fifth rate. This frigate was originally the French Galathée-class frigate Charente Inférieure, which was launched in 1793 during the French Revolutionary Wars and renamed Tribune the next year. The British captured her and took her into service with the Royal Navy. She only served for a year before being wrecked off Herring Cove, Nova Scotia, on 16 or 23 November 1797. Of the 240 men on board, all but 12 were lost.

== Career ==
=== Capture ===
In mid-1796, Tribune was under the command of Commodore John Moulson (or Moulston), an American who had served in the French Navy for 16 years. He was in command of a squadron of three frigates and a corvette. One of the frigates, the 26-gun Proserpine, parted company with her companion vessels in a fog.

On 8 June Tribune and her remaining two companions, the frigate Tamise and the corvette Legere, were sailing off the south coast of Ireland. At daybreak the British frigates Unicorn and Santa Margarita spotted the three French vessels and proceeded to chase them.

Tamise eventually turned to engage her pursuers, but Santa Margarita captured her after a 20-minute battle. Legere escaped. Separately, Dryad captured Proserpine a few days later; the British took her into service as Amelia.

Tribune continued to attempt to escape Unicorn in a running fight that lasted ten hours. Unicorn eventually pulled alongside and an intense, 35-minutes long engagement ensued. Tribune attempted to drop astern to rake Unicorn's stern, but good handling by Unicorn foiled the attempt. Unicorn again came alongside and continued to fire upon Tribune. Finally, when all her masts except her mizzenmast had been shot away, Tribune struck her colours.

Tribune had lost 37 men killed of her crew of 337 men, as well as 15 wounded, including Moulston. Unicorn, despite having only 140 of her normal complement of 151 aboard, with a lieutenant and her best seamen having taken a prize to Cork, had suffered no casualties.

The victory earned Unicorn's captain a knighthood. In 1847 the Admiralty awarded the remaining survivors of this action the Naval General Service Medal with clasp "Unicorn 8 June 1796". The crews of Santa Margaritta and Dryad also won the Naval General Service Medal with clasps "Sta. Margaritta 8 June 1796" for the capture of Tamise and "Dryad 13 June 1796" for the capture of Proserpine.

=== Sinking ===
Tribune was placed under the command of Captain Scory Barker, who sailed her from Torbay on 22 September 1797 as escort to a convoy to the Quebec and Newfoundland fleets. En route he met Experiment, then 12 days out of Halifax. On 10 October Tribune lost sight of the convoy, but continued towards Halifax. As they arrived at the approaches to Halifax Harbour on 16 November, Captain Barker suggested waiting for a pilot, but was convinced by the master, who claimed that "he had beat a 44-gun ship into the harbour, that he had frequently been there, nor was there any occasion for a pilot since the wind was favourable." Captain Barker was apparently convinced by these assurances, and went below to arrange some papers he wished to take onshore. The master assumed the pilotage of the ship, assisted by one John Cosey, who had lived in the area previously.

As the ship progressed into the harbour, she began to approach the Thrum Cap shoal. Alarmed, the master summoned Mr Galvin, the master's mate, who at this time was sick below. Coming up on deck, Galvin heard the man in the chains sing out "by the mark five" and Cosey sing out "steady". Climbing onto a carronade, he attempted to ascertain the situation, whilst the master ran up to the wheel with the intent to wear ship. Before anything could be done however, Tribune struck the shoal. Alerted by the impact, Captain Barker rushed up on deck, exclaiming "You have lost the ship" to the master. Distress signals were quickly run up, which were acknowledged by the military posts nearby, as well as the ships in the harbour, and several craft set out to aid the stricken ship. A number of military boats, and a boat under the command of a Mr Rackum, boatswain of the ordinary, managed to reach Tribune. Strong adverse winds prevented many others from doing so.

Her crew made attempts to lighten Tribune. The guns, save one for signalling, were thrown overboard, as was every other heavy article. These efforts allowed Tribune to get off the shoal by 9 o'clock in the evening. She had by now lost her rudder and had seven feet of water in the hold. The crew manned the pumps but after a period of time in which they seemed to be gaining on the leaks, a violent gale from the south east blew up and carried Tribune steadily towards the western shore. Lieutenants Campbell and North managed to escape in a jolly boat, but by half past ten, Tribune lurched over and sank off Herring Cove, Nova Scotia. The captain and officers were believed lost, but over 240 men, women and children remained, floating in the water or clinging to the rigging.

Eventually nearly a hundred of the survivors had managed to climb into the rigging, but as the night wore on and the storm took its toll, many dropped off and were swept away. Eventually there were only eight remaining, despite them being close enough to the shore to converse with the local inhabitants who had lit a large bonfire on the beach. At 8 o'clock in the morning of 24 November, a 13-year-old boy named Joe Cracker went out in a small skiff and brought off a man named David Monroe, another named Dunlap and two others, who were so exhausted they wished only to perish as they lay and had to be lifted into the skiff. As the weather improved, a number of boats were able to reach the wreck, bringing off another four. Overall, four had escaped in the jolly boat and another eight had been brought off from the rigging. These twelve were the only survivors of the wreck.

=== Commemoration ===
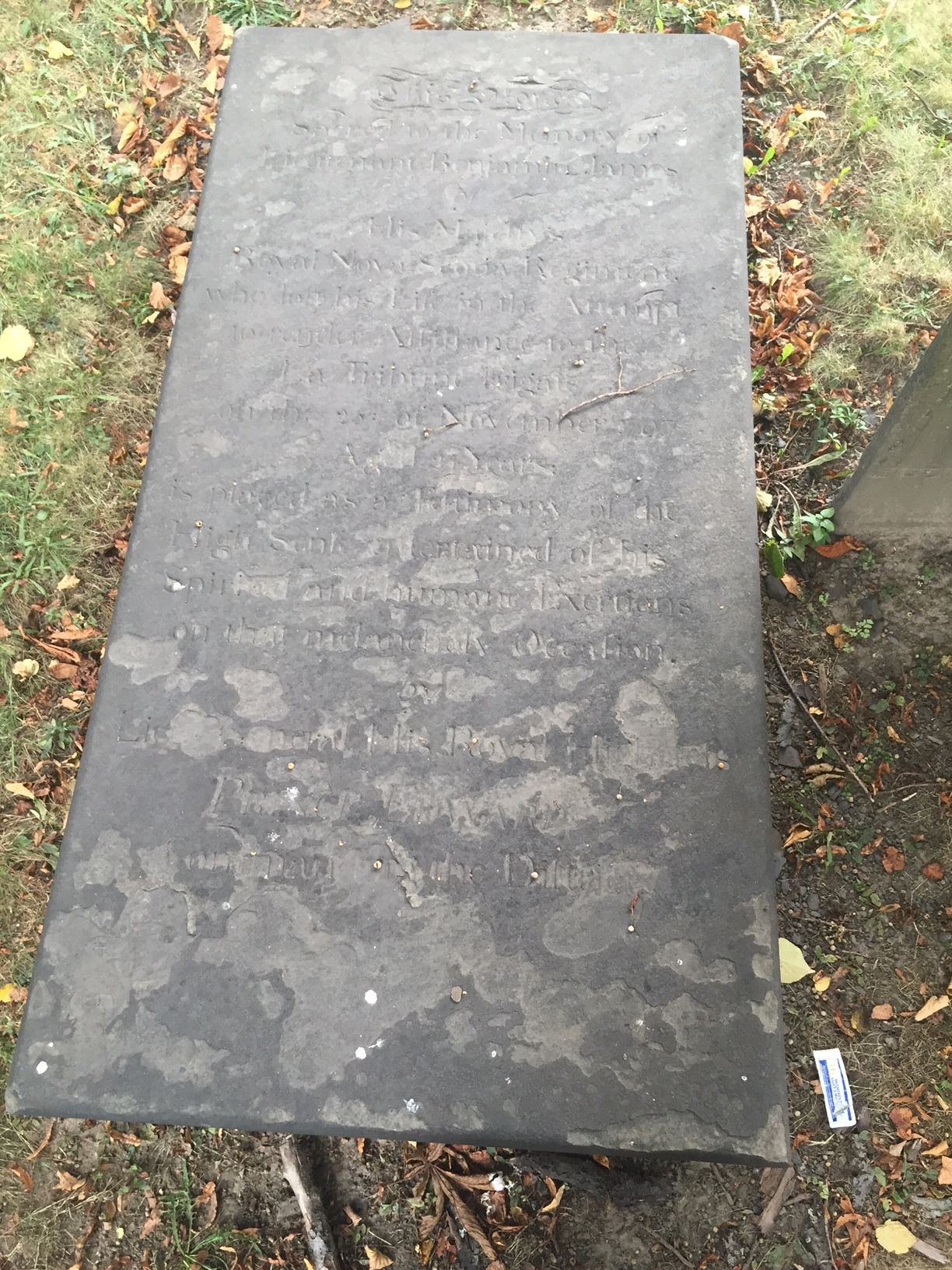
Lt. Benjamin James, Royal Nova Scotia Regiment, Old Burying Ground (Halifax, Nova Scotia), died while trying to rescue those who died in HMS Tribune in 1797; commemorated by Prince Edward

The location of the sinking was soon named Tribune Head. A cairn and bronze plaque in Herring Cove mark the site and the nearby mass grave of her victims. Salvors recovered Tribune's bell in the 19th century and presented it to St. Paul's Catholic church in Herring Cove. The bell was donated to the Nova Scotia Museum in the 1920s and now forms the centrepiece of an exhibit about the wreck at the Maritime Museum of the Atlantic in Halifax, Nova Scotia. Lt. Benjamin James of the Royal Nova Scotia Regiment died while trying to rescue passengers. He was buried at the Old Burying Ground (Halifax, Nova Scotia) and commemorated by Prince Edward.
