= Croisière du Grand Hiver order of battle =

Battle during the French Revolutionary Wars

The Order of battle of the Croisière du Grand Hiver lists the French forces involved in the Campaign of the Great Winter 24 December 1794 – 3 February 1795, during the French Revolutionary Wars.

== Order of Battle ==
First squadron, Villaret-Joyeuse
Division	Ship	Guns	Commander	Notes
First division	Tourville	74	Henry	
First division	Montagne	120	Captain Vignot; Vice-amiral Villaret-Joyeuse	
First division	Marat	74	Captain Le Francq	
Second division	Gasparin	74	L'Hermitte	
Second division	Révolution	74	Lalande	
Third division	Superbe	74	Colomb	Lost on 30 January, 21 men lost
Third division	Neuf Thermidor	80	Doré	Lost on 29 January
Third division	Alexandre	74	Guillemet	
Second squadron, Bouvet
Division	Ship	Guns	Commander	Notes
Fourth division	Jemmappes	74	Lafond; Contre-amiral Renaudin	
Fourth division	Majestueux	110	Le Beau	Contre-amiral (rear-Admiral)
Fourth division	Aquilon	74	La Terre	
Fifth division	Montagnard	74	Richery	
Fifth division	Scipion	74	Huguet	Lost on 30 January
Fifth division	Trente-et-un-Mai	74	Ganteaume	
Sixth division	Patriote	74	Le Tendre	
Sixth division	Entreprenant	74	Dufay	
Third squadron, Nielly
Division	Ship	Guns	Commander	Notes
Seventh division	Convention	74	Terrasson	Lost her rudder on 30 January, towed back to Lorient
Seventh division	Terrible	110	Captain Bedout; Contre-admiral Nielly	
Seventh division	Pelletier	74	Raillard	
Eighth division	Révolutionnaire	110	Le Gouardin	Returned in a battered state. Deemed irreparable and broken up.
Eighth division	Nestor	74	Monnier	Damaged, back to harbour on 31 December.
Ninth division	Trajan	74	Leroy	
Ninth division	Indomptable	74	Le Mesle	
Ninth division	Tyrannicide	74	Alain-Joseph Dordelin	
Light squadron, Van Stabel
Division	Ship	Guns	Commander	Notes
First division	Éole	74	Trinquelléon	
First division	Jean Bart	74	Pittet	
First division	Audacieux	74	Philastre	
First division	Tigre	74	Matagne; Contre-amiral Van Stabel	
First division	Fougueux	74	La Brière	
Second division	Zélé	74	Porlodec	
Second division	Mucius	74	Larreguy	
Second division	Téméraire	74	Morel	Damaged, back to Saint-Malo on 31 December. Deemed irreparable and broken up.
Second division	Droits de l'Homme	74	Cornic	
Ships that failed to depart
	Républicain	110	Longer	Wrecked on Mingant rock. 10 men lost.
	Redoutable	74	Montcousu	Damaged while departing, had to cancel.
	Neptune	74	Tiphaigne	Delayed by damage to her capstan, later ran aground off Perros Guirrec. 50 men lost.
Frigates and smaller ships
	Vertu		Lieutenant Montagniès	
	Courageuse	44	Captain Dalbarade	
	Méduse	26		
	Virginie	44	Jacques Bergeret	
	Surveillante	32		
	Insurgente			
	Railleuse	32		
	Précieuse			
	Fraternité	32		
	Embuscade	32		
	Tamise	32	Fradin	
	Charente	36		
	Républicaine	32	François Pitot	
	Berceau	22		
	Bayonnaise	24		
	Légère	22	Carpentier, fils.	
	Réolaise	20	Lieutenant Tanays	
	Espion	16		
	Bergère	16		
	Impatiente			
	Atalante	16		
	Papillon	12		
	Bonnet Rouge			
Total casualties: 81 men
Source: Histoire des marins français 1789-1815, CA (2eS) Hubert Granier, p.94 Batailles navales de la France, Onésime-Joachim Troude, Challamel ainé, 1867, vol.2, p. 404

== Notes and references ==
=== Bibliography ===
- Granier, Hubert (1998). Histoire des Marins français 1789-1815. illustrations by Alain Coz. Marines éditions. ISBN 2-909675-41-6.
- Roche, Jean-Michel (2005). Dictionnaire des bâtiments de la flotte de guerre française de Colbert à nos jours. Vol. 1. Group Retozel-Maury Millau. ISBN 978-2-9525917-0-6. OCLC 165892922. (1671-1870)
- Troude, Onésime-Joachim (1867). Batailles navales de la France (in French). Vol. 2. Challamel ainé.
- Fonds Marine. Campagnes (opérations; divisions et stations navales; missions diverses). Inventaire de la sous-série Marine BB4. Tome premier : BB4 1 à 482 (1790-1826)
