= Quibéron mutinies =

Series of mutinies in the French Navy in 1793

The Quibéron mutinies were a series of mutinies that occurred in the Brest squadron of the French Navy in September 1793, at the height of the Reign of Terror. They offered reasons and pretexts for the Jacobins to purge the Navy of most of its officers who belonged to the French aristocracy. The event was interpreted as both a culmination of the disorganisation of the French Navy from 1790, and a cause of its disorganisation in the following years.

After several months of cruise, a large squadron stationed off Quiberon mutinied and demanded to sail back to harbour. The mutineers took pretext of the surrender of Toulon to a combined Anglo-Spanish force, arguing that their presence in Brest was required to prevent Royalist conspirators from surrendering Brest as well; in the face of overt rebellion, and incapable of maintaining discipline and order, Vice-admiral Morard de Galles took upon himself to order the return to Brest.

In consequence, représentant en mission Jean Bon Saint-André, the naval expert of the National Convention, was called to Brest to reestablish order and reorganise the Navy. The following repression claimed relatively few lives in the Navy, but argued of a putative Royalist plot by Navy officers loyal to the Ancien Régime to explain the incident. In consequence, a number of officers were relieved of duty and arrested, including two admirals.

== Background ==
The collapse of the French absolute monarchy with the French Revolution had an important impact on the French Navy: the Navy was strongly linked to the monarchy by its officer corps, largely recruited from the nobility, and trained in highly technical disciplines; it was also enormously dependent on funds and supplies to maintain ships and crews. The collapse of Royal power triggered a shift of authority towards local governments, the revolutionary municipalities. These municipalities were both the rivals of the former centres of authority under the Ancien Régime, and potential rivals to the central power in Paris.

The fleet was weakened by supply difficulties, such as a chronic lack of clothes which made the crews suffer greatly at sea. At Quibéron, the crews were isolated from the shore, and started to run low on food. After four months at sea, they were fed mostly with salted food.

Chronic indiscipline reigned amongst the crews: sailors would quit their ships after reviews, or refuse to depart, arguing that the ships were being sailed in order to be surrendered to the British; the municipalities had to intervene and help the Navy convince these sailors to obey. The climate deteriorated to the point that in the night of 6 August, part of Northumberland's standing rigging was sabotaged. In March, after Jean Bart and Trajan were sent to Vannes, a significant proportion of their crews deserted. In May, in the face of rapid devaluation of the currency, crewmen from the frigates Engageante and Proserpine refused to embark unless they were paid in advance; consequently, on 17 May, 150 men from Proserpine, out of a 260-man complement, failed to report for duty. Some of the crewmen considered their duty to scrutinise their own officers, and regarded themselves, as representative of the French people, to be legitimate sources of authority.

Emigration of Navy officers by March 1792
| Rank | Present | % | Absent | % | Total |
|---|---|---|---|---|---|
| Vice-admiral | 2 | - | 7 | - | 9 |
| Rear-admiral | 2 | - | 15 | - | 18 |
| Captain | 42 | 25% | 128 | 75% | 170 |
| Lieutenant | 356 | 67% | 174 | 33% | 530 |
Source: Nofficial, p. 10

Sailors had lost their trust in their officers, who tended to be suspicious of each other as well. Navy officers from the French Royal Navy of the Ancien Régime, the officiers rouges, openly despised the new social order brought about by the French First Republic, and were particularly frustrated by the lack of discipline generated by the philosophy of égalité, as highly detrimental to the organisation of the Navy. Nevertheless, some of these officers, the first of them Morard de Galles, were actually dedicated to the Republic and its egalitarian principles – all the more, in fact, since they hoped that the advent of the Republic would fill the authority void caused by the collapse of the monarchy. Others, such as Kerguelen or Lemarant-Boissauveur, had suffered humiliations from the naval establishment of the Ancien Régime, doubling the republican loyalty of their political convictions with personal resentment against the old order. Rear-admiral Landais would carry revolutionary fervour and suspicion to the point of denouncing Lelarge and Morard de Galles as suspect, and be considered as paranoid by Jeanbon Saint-André.

On the other hand, officers enlisted from the merchant Navy felt insulted by the perceived arrogance of their comrades, and were suspicious as to the sincerity of their allegiance to the Republic. Captain Coëtnempren would be arrested and eventually sent to the guillotine upon a denunciation by a junior officer who accused him from withholding his advancement because he was a commoner from the merchant navy. Due to the desertions of high-ranking officers of noble extraction or Royalist convictions, these merchant officers were promoted very quickly to fill the ranks; this both transformed the social composition of naval staff, and promoted officers of little experience to command positions.

In January 1793, Morard de Galles was promoted to vice-admiral, and given overall command of the naval forces of Brest. Aware of the sorry state of his fleet, Morard de Galles wrote to the Committee of Public Safety to express his concerns, but was ignored.

France declared war on Great Britain on 1 February 1793, and very quickly, the British made contact with Royalist guerrilla forces in Vendée and Brittany. This made it necessary not only to protect French merchant convoys in the English Channel, but also to patrol the shores of France and prevent any potential British support from reaching the Chouans.

== Events ==
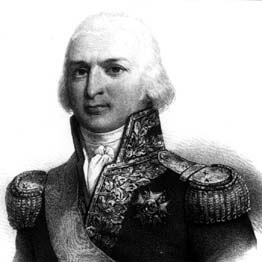
Vice-admiral Morard de Galles commanded the Brest squadron.

On 8 March, Morard de Galles was ordered to take a 3-ship and 7-frigate division off Brest. Soon after their departure, a storm scattered the division and forced it back to harbour, where it arrived on 19. The same storm forced another division, under Captain Duval, to turn back; Duval had in fact died on Tourville, killed by a loose block when he attempted to secure a sail after his men had refused to obey his orders.

In mid-September, Captain Villaret-Joyeuse anchored the 74-guns Trajan and Jean Bart at Quibéron, to prevent communications between the British and the Chouans. These forces were soon deemed insufficient, and a flow of warships trickled from Brest, Lorient and Rochefort to reinforce Villaret's squadron. By 22 May, the forces in Quibéron were so considerable that Morard de Galles was sent to take command, with four more ships of the line; In June, the three-deckers Terrible and Bretagne prepared to depart under Rear-admiral Lelarge, but the crews refused to set sails and the officers had to request help from the municipalities to establish their authority over their own men. By early September 1793, Morard headed a squadron composed of 22 ships of the line and 13 frigates.

Morard's mission was two-fold: protect inbound convoys depredation of the Royal Navy; and establish a watch and blockade of those departments tempted by Chouannerie. These instructions were in fact contradictory: protecting convoys entailed sailing in the open sea, while blockading the Chouans required ships as close to the shore as possible; therefore, Morard could not fulfill both missions without splitting his forces, but from the station where he was ordered, off Quiberon, between Groix and Belle Île, he could perform neither. Morard wrote in vain to Navy commissioner Jean Dalbarade to argue for a blockade of the England shores instead. Rear-admiral Kerguelen wrote:

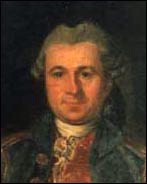
Rear-admiral Kerguelen-Trémarec commanded a six-ship division. He was very critical of the dispositions taken by Minister Dalbarade, and later wrote a bitter account of the incident in his Relation des combats et des évènements de la guerre maritime de 1778 entre la France et l'Angleterre.

The station given to our army was bad politically and militarily. The naval Army of the Republic could not seize any prize there. It could, on the contrary, be attacked by superior forces, that no retreat could allow it to evade, considering that the coast forms a gulf, without the resource of any harbour; that the one at Lorient cannot harbour ten ships of the line, and that in any case one can enter it only at full tide, which is a great inconvenient both during a battle and during a storm. It was therefore absurd to hold in this dangerous position, for the Navy and for the State, the whole of our naval forces of the Ocean. (Note: La station donnée à notre armée était mauvaise politiquement et militairement. L'armée navale de la République ne pouvait y faire aucune prise. Elle pouvait au contraire être assaillie par des forces supérieures, qu'aucune retraite ne pouvait lui faire éviter, vu que la côte forme un golfe, sans la ressource d'aucun port; que celui de l'Orient ne peut recevoir dix vaisseaux de ligne, et que d'ailleurs on ne peut y entrer qu'à l'heure de la pleine mer, ce qui est un grand inconvénient et dans un combat et dans une tempête. Il était donc absurde de tenir dans cette position périlleuse, pour la marine et pour l'état, toutes nos forces navale de l'océan.)

Morard repeatedly wrote to Dalbarade for clarification his orders, complaining that they "contradict[ed] themselves at each paragraph"; eventually he even requested to be replaced, but to no avail. On 10 August, a war council was held on Terrible, where all senior officers agreed that the state of the fleet was becoming critical and that it was urgent to sail back to Brest, but Dalbarade was unmoved.

In early September, Morard received the third task of intercepting a Dutch convoy; this required to detach a five-ship division, thus dividing and exposing his forces. Before the division could depart, on 12 September, the crews were informed of the surrender of Toulon to a combined Anglo-Spanish force, and rumours started to spread that Brest herself was also in danger of being surrendered by Royalist conspirators; sailors began suspecting their officers of prolonging the cruise to communicate with the Chouans and Royalists. A deputation of the crews, composed of Midshipmen Crevel and Baron, from Auguste, went to see Morard, demanding that he set sail for Brest immediately. Morard answered that he would only return upon orders from the government.

On 14 September, Morard discovered the topsails readied to depart on the ships Suffren, Tourville, Convention, Achille, Superbe, Auguste, Northumberland and Révolution. Considering that his officer could no longer exert their authority on their own crews, and fearing that a portion of his forces would depart and leave the rest even more exposed, Motart toured his least trustworthy ships with Kerguelen and Landais, and organised a council: in order to conciliate the men, a fleet summit would be held on Terrible, with all admirals and Captains present, and where each ship would be represented a seaman.

The council unanimously requested to return to Brest, but Morard read the orders of the Convention and gave a speech that convinced it to request further orders from the National Convention. It was decided that the squadron would set sail to escort a convoy that had been anchored for several days off Morbihan. The frigate Bellone, which escorted it, had run aground when arriving, and her crew had refused to execute orders, preventing her officers from refloating her. However, with his letter to the Convention, Morard had added that, since order would last only until favourable winds to the return to Brest, in order to maintain the pretence of authority, he was determined to return to Brest as soon as possible in any case.

The fleet departed on 19 September, as soon as the winds blew favourably. The next day, it met a frigate carrying deputy Tréhouart de Beaulieu, who was welcomed aboard and held another council. There again, it was determined that the fleet was in no condition to continue its mission and should return to Brest; Tréhouart ordered it made so, in the interest of the safety of the ship and of the pretence of command. The fleet arrived at Belle Île on 26, and in the road of Brest on 28 September.

== Aftermath ==
Upon the return of the fleet, over 600 men were hospitalised, suffering from scurvy due to the poor diet they had had aboard. All communication from ship to ship or with the shore was strictly forbidden, and Tréhouart started an immediate enquiry into the facts, and within four days arrested thirty men and sent them to be detained at the Château de Brest.

Tréhouart then used the full power of the recently passed Law of Suspects. The law ordered arrested not only anyone culprit of disloyalty, but also those who had not constantly displayed their attachment to the Republic, and even those who had emigrated between 1 July 1789 and 8 April 1792, even if returned to France within delays fixed by law; this last point effectively entrapped many Navy officers of the former French Royal Navy. In consequence, a large number of sailors and officers were arrested.

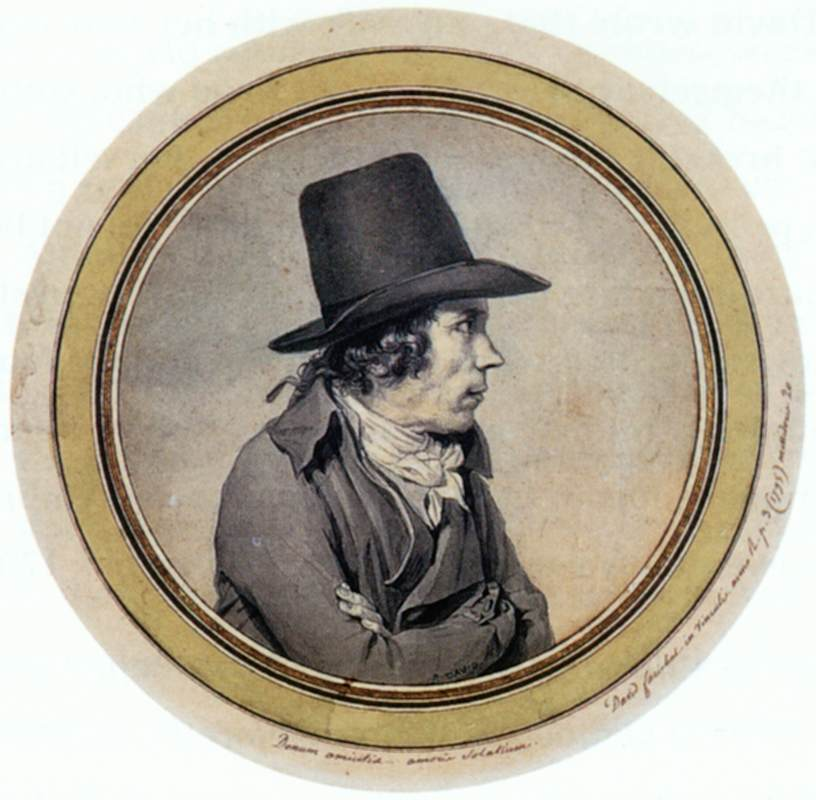
Représentant en mission Jean Bon Saint-André reestablished order by terror in the aftermath of the mutinies.

On 3 October, représentants en mission Joseph Laignelot and Joseph Lequinio destitued Rear-admiral Latouche-Tréville, recently appointed to command the Brest squadron. The next day, Représentant en mission Jeanbon Saint-André and Prieur de la Marne arrived in Brest. They connected the mutinies to the Federalist revolts and likened them to the surrender of Toulon, already mentioned by the mutineers to justify their will to return to Brest; from there, they extrapolated the existence of a Royalist or Girondin plot to destroy the fleet.

Jeanbon Saint-André and Prieur de la Marne launched purges of noble officers, destituting Vice-admirals Kersaint and Girardin, Rear-admirals Lavilléon and Lelarge, and 71 ship-of-the-line captains. From those directly implicated in the mutinies of Quibéron, Vice-admiral Morard de Galles, Rear-admiral Lelarge, Rear-admiral Kerguelen and Captain Boissauveur were relieved from duty; Morard de Galles was arrested and detained for 18 months. Captains Thomas, Duplessis-Grenédan and Coëtnempren were sent before the Revolutionary Tribunal, and Captains Bonnefoux and Richery were arrested. Captains Coëtnempren, Gras-Préville, Brach, Cuers de Cogolin, Duplessis de Grénédan, and a number of other officers, (Note: including officers Chasteignier, Barder, Daugier, Bouis, Boulouvard and Lassale) were later sentenced to death and executed, under the pretext that they have thwarted a plan to intercept a Dutch convoy.

In the same decree, Captain Villaret-Joyeuse, who had successfully maintained order on Trajan and had good relations with Jeanbon Saint-André, was promoted to Rear-admiral and put in command of the Brest fleet. Vanstabel, Cornic and Martin were promoted to Rear-Admirals. These dispositions laid the cast of the Atlantic campaign of May 1794 and the Glorious First of June.

== Order of battle ==
The Brest squadron ("Armée navale de l'Océan", "Naval army of the Ocean") comprised 22 ships of the line and 13 frigates.

Morard's squadron
| Ship | Type | Guns | Navy | Commander | Notes |
|---|---|---|---|---|---|
| Auguste | | 80 | French-Navy-Revolution | Rear-admiral Kerguelen-Trémarec | |
| Indomptable | Tonnant type | 80 | French-Navy-Revolution | Captain Bruix | |
| Juste | | 80 | French-Navy-Revolution | Captain Terrasson | |
| Audacieux | 74-gun | 74 | French-Navy-Revolution | Captain Bouvet | |
| Téméraire | 74-gun | 74 | French-Navy-Revolution | Captain Dorré | |
| Suffren | 74-gun | 74 | French-Navy-Revolution | Captain Obet | Renamed Redoutable after the events |
| Impétueux | 74-gun | 74 | French-Navy-Revolution | Captain Levêque | |
| Aquilon | 74-gun | 74 | French-Navy-Revolution | Captain Henry | |
| Northumberland | 74-gun | 74 | French-Navy-Revolution | Captain Thomas | Captain tried by the Revolutionary Tribunal |
| Tourville | 74-gun | 74 | French-Navy-Revolution | Captain Langlois | |
| Achille | 74-gun | 74 | French-Navy-Revolution | Captain Keranguen | |
| Convention | 74-gun | 74 | French-Navy-Revolution | Captain Labatut | |
| Neptune | 74-gun | 74 | French-Navy-Revolution | Captain Tiphaine | |
| Révolution | 74-gun | 74 | French-Navy-Revolution | Captain Trinqualéon | |
| Superbe | 74-gun | 74 | French-Navy-Revolution | Captain Lemarant-Boissauveur | |
| Sans Pareil | 74-gun | 74 | French-Navy-Revolution | Captain Demons | |
Source: Troude, vol.2, pp. 287–288

Landais' squadron (arrived on the eve of the mutiny)
| Ship | Type | Guns | Navy | Commander | Notes |
|---|---|---|---|---|---|
| Côte-d'Or | capital ship | 120 | French-Navy-Revolution | Captain Duplessis-Grénédan; Rear-admiral Landais | Duplessis-Grénédan arrested and guillotined |
| Tigre | 74-gun | 74 | French-Navy-Revolution | Captain Vanstabel | |
Source: Troude, vol.2, pp. 287–288; Corcmack, p. 40

Rear-admiral Lelarge's squadron
| Ship | Type | Guns | Navy | Commander | Notes |
|---|---|---|---|---|---|
| Terrible | capital ship | 110 | French-Navy-Revolution | Captain Bonnefoux; Vice-admiral Morard de Galles | Flagship. Bonnefoux and Morard de Galles both arrested, Morard relieved of duty. |
| Bretagne | capital ship | 110 | French-Navy-Revolution | Captain Richery; Rear-admiral Lelarge | Richery arrested. Lelarge relieved of duty. |
Another ship of the line from Morard's fleet came with this squadron. Source: Troude, vol.2, pp. 287–288; Corcmack, p. 34

Division of the Coasts of Morbihan and Vendée (Captain Villaret-Joyeuse)
| Ship | Type | Guns | Navy | Commander | Notes |
|---|---|---|---|---|---|
| Trajan | 74-gun | 74 | French-Navy-Revolution | Captain Villaret-Joyeuse | |
| Jean Bart | 74-gun | 74 | French-Navy-Revolution | Captain Coëtnempren de Kerdouarnan | Captain tried by the Revolutionary Tribunal and guillotined. |
| Capricieuse | frigate | | French-Navy-Revolution | Captain Savary | |
| Experiment | frigate | | French-Navy-Revolution | Lieutenant Corbel de Kérillieau; Later Captain Jacquelin | |
| Nymphe | frigate | | French-Navy-Revolution | Captain Dordelin; Later Lieutenant Pitot | |
| Thétis | frigate | | French-Navy-Revolution | Captain Vanstabel; Later Captain Gourdon; Later Lieutenant Frémont | |
| Perdrix | corvette | 20 | French-Navy-Revolution | Ensign Renaudin; Later Ensign Garreau; Later Lieutenant Barré | |
| Cousine | aviso | | French-Navy-Revolution | Ensign Farjenel | |
| Éveillé | aviso | | French-Navy-Revolution | Lieutenant Briand | |
Source: Troude, vol.2, pp. 287–288; Fonds Marine, vol.1, pp. 44–45

Frigates
| Ship | Type | Guns | Navy | Commander | Notes |
|---|---|---|---|---|---|
| Proserpine | Frigate | | French-Navy-Revolution | Captain Henry; Later Captain Blavet | |
| Pomone | Frigate | | French-Navy-Revolution | Captain Dumoutier | |
| Uranie | Frigate | | French-Navy-Revolution | Captain Tartu; Lieutenant Wuibert; Lieutenant Proteau | |
| Carmagnole | Frigate | | French-Navy-Revolution | Captain Allemand | |
| Galathée | Frigate | | French-Navy-Revolution | Captain Flotte | |
| Engageante | Frigate | | French-Navy-Revolution | Captain Letendre; Later Lieutenant Berthault-La Bretèche | |
| Insurgente | Frigate | | French-Navy-Revolution | | |
| Gracieuse (later Unité) | Frigate | | French-Navy-Revolution | Captain Chevillard | |
| Sémillante | Frigate | | French-Navy-Revolution | Captain Bruix; Later Lieutenant Gaillard; Later Ensign Garreau; Later Captain Lemancq | |
| Andromaque | Frigate | | French-Navy-Revolution | Captain Renaudin | |
| Médée | Frigate | | French-Navy-Revolution | Lieutenant Minbielle; Later Lieutenant Papin (the elder) | |
| Bellone | Frigate | | French-Navy-Revolution | | |
| Hermione | Frigate | | French-Navy-Revolution | Lieutenant Leprince; Later Lieutenant Lafargue; Later Captain Martin | |
Source: Troude, vol.2, p. 288

== Notes and references ==
=== Bibliography ===
- Cormack, William S. (2002). "8". Revolution and Political Conflict in the French Navy 1789-1794. Cambridge University Press. p. 215. ISBN 978-0521472098.
- Guérin, Léon (1857). Histoire maritime de France (in French). Vol. 5. Dufour et Mulat.
- Kerguelen-Trémarec, Yves-Joseph (1796). Relation des combats et des évènements de la guerre maritime de 1778 entre la France et l'Angleterre (in French). Imprimerie de Patris.
- Levot, Prosper (1866). Les gloires maritimes de la France: notices biographiques sur les plus célèbres marins (in French). Bertrand.
- Jean Bon Saint-André, André (1793). Rapport sur les mouvements qui ont eu lieu sur l'escadre de la république, commandée par le vice-amiral Morard-de-Galles, et sur sa rentrée à Brest, fait aux représentants du peuple auprès de l'armée navale (in French). Imprimerie de Malassis.
- Troude, Onésime-Joachim (1867). Batailles navales de la France (in French). Vol. 2. Challamel ainé.

=== External links ===
- Chaline, Oliver. "Les mutineries de 1797 dans la Navy".
- Cormack, William S. "The French Navy and the Struggle for Revolutionary Authority: The Mutiny of the Brest Fleet in 1793". cjhistory.synergiesprairies.ca. Canadian journal of History.
- Nofficial, Sébastien. "Le Port et l'Arsenal de Lorient en 1793" (PDF). sahpl.asso.fr. Société d'Archéologie et d'Histoire du Pays de Lorient.
