= Action of 11 April 1783 =

1783 action of the American Revolutionary War

- Part of the American Revolutionary War
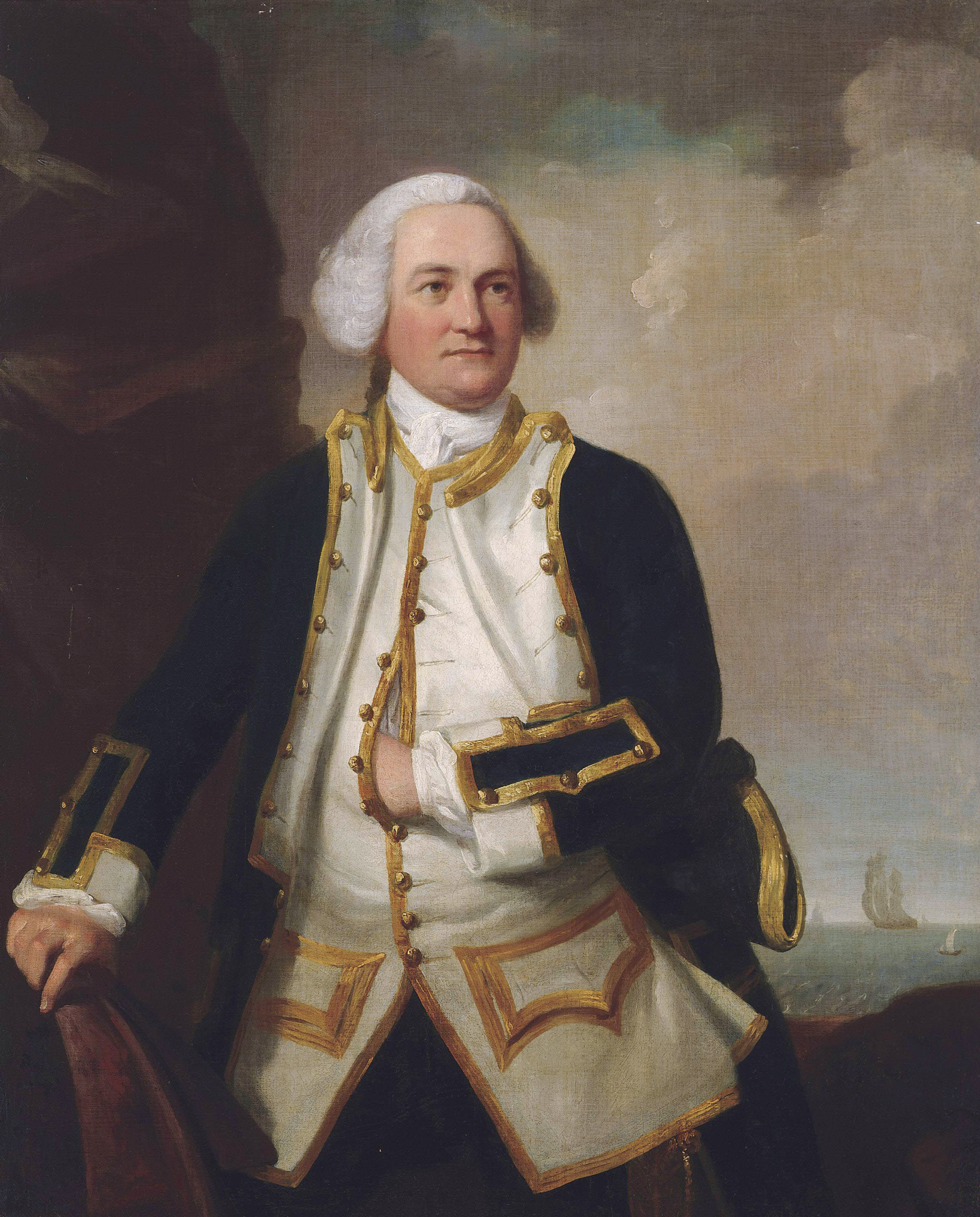
- Portrait of Samuel Graves
Date	11 April 1783
Location	Bay of Bengal, Indian Ocean
Result	British victory

Belligerents
Great Britain	France

Commanders and leaders
Samuel Graves	Villaret de Joyeuse (surrendered)

Strength
1 ship of the line	1 corvette

Casualties and losses
24 killed or wounded	34 killed or wounded 160 captured 1 corvette captured

The action of 11 April 1783 was a naval engagement which took place during the American Revolutionary War in the East Indies campaign. The French corvette Naïade was spotted by the 64-gun HMS Sceptre. In a five hour long fight Sceptre captured Naïade off Trincomalee on the night of 14 April 1783.

== Background ==
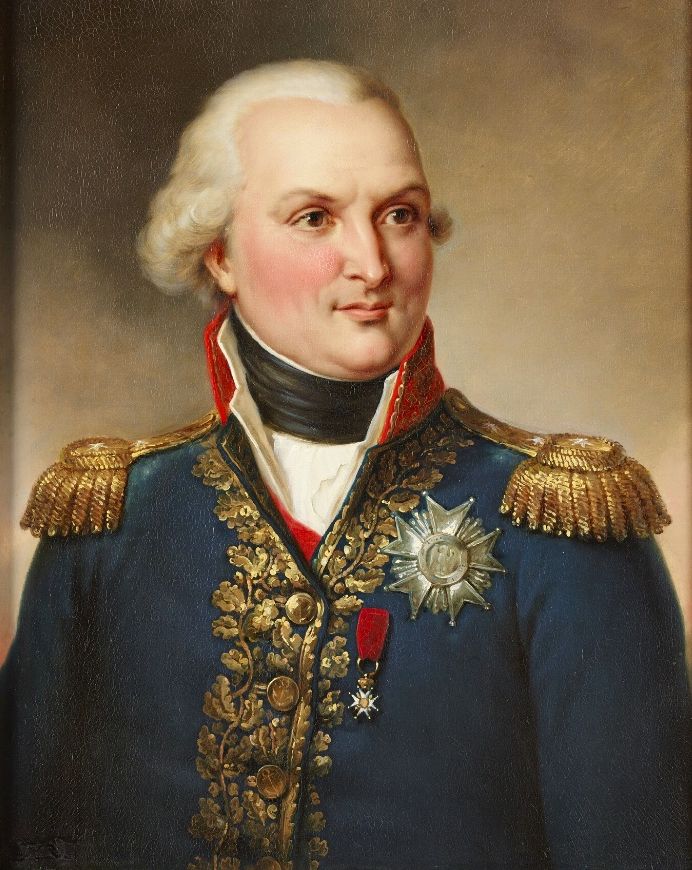
Villaret de Joyeuse later in his career as a vice admiral

On 11 April, Captaine de Brûlot Louis Thomas Villaret de Joyeuse was given command of Naïade. Admiral Pierre André de Suffren sent her to Madras to warn the French blockading squadron, composed of the 74-gun Fendant, the 64-gun Saint-Michel and the frigates Cléopâtre and Coventry, of the imminent arrival of a superior British force.

== Action ==
Three days after her departure, on 11 April 1783, Naïade spotted the 64-gun HMS Sceptre, under Captain Samuel Graves. In the light of a full moon and with the wind too light to escape and trying without success to elude his much stronger opponent, Villaret was forced into battle. At 22:00 the cannonade began and after two hours of resistance as Sceptre closed in on Naïade, Graves invited Villaret to surrender but the latter flatly refused.

The fight resumed, but soon Naïade began suffering heavy damage. After two hours of resistance the French corvette had lost two topmasts, her wheel shot away, seven guns dismounted and her rigging was disabled. Villaret seeing that further resistance was futile struck his colours. The Sceptre had only the mizenmast damaged; casualties were light on both sides, 24 on the Sceptre and 34 on the Naïade. Having admired the fight and the resistance, Graves reportedly returned Villaret de Joyeuses' sword to him.

== Aftermath ==
The Naïade was found to be armed with eighteen to twenty 8-pounder guns and ten swivel guns, and had a crew of 160 men, the latter of which became prisoners of war including Villaret. Despite the loss of Naïade, the British squadron was unable to locate the French ships, Sceptre would next take part in the Battle of Cuddalore against Suffren's fleet two months later. The British armed Naïade with twenty-two 12-pounder guns, and two 18-pounder and six 12-pounder carronade, but never commissioned her.

== Bibliography ==
- Cavaliero, Roderick (1994). Admiral Satan Life and Campaigns of Suffren. Bloomsbury Academic. ISBN 9781850436867.
- Demerliac, Alain (1996). La Marine de Louis XVI Nomenclature des navires français, de 1774 à 1792 (in French). FeniXX réédition numérique. ISBN 9782307464198.
