= Jean François Renaudin =

French Navy officer (1750–1809)

Counter-Admiral Jean-François Renaudin
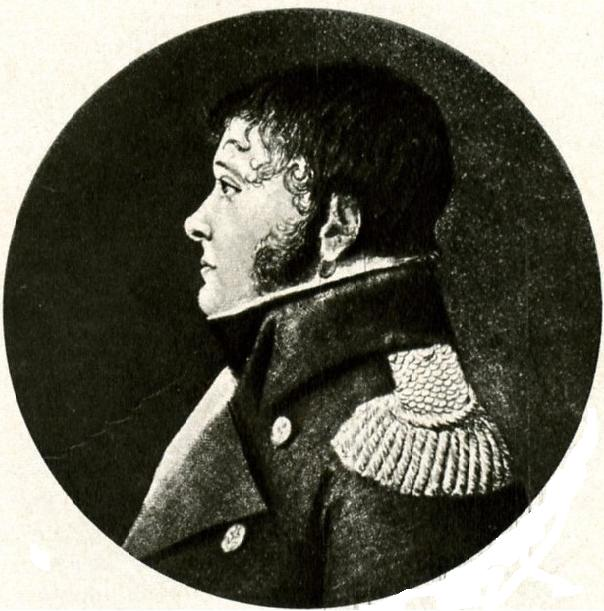
- Portrait of Renaudin
- Born: 13 July 1750; Le Gua, Charente-Maritime
- Died: 29 April 1809 (aged 58); Le Gua, Charente-Maritime
- Relatives: Cousin to Cyprien Renaudin
- Military career
- Allegiance: Kingdom of France; French First Republic; First French Empire
- Branch: French Navy; French Imperial Navy
- Service years: 1780–1809
- Rank: Counter admiral
- Conflicts: American Revolutionary War; French Revolutionary Wars; Glorious First of June (surrendered); Croisière du Grand Hiver; Napoleonic Wars
- Awards: Baron of the Empire; Legion of Honour; Name engraved on the Arc de Triomphe (column 40)

Counter-Admiral Jean François Renaudin (French pronunciation: [ʒɑ̃ fʁɑ̃swa ʁənodɛ̃]; 13 July 1750 – 29 April 1809) was a French Navy officer who served in the American Revolutionary War and French Revolutionary and Napoleonic Wars. He is mostly known for captaining the Vengeur du Peuple at the Glorious First of June.

== Career ==
=== Early life ===
Jean François Renaudin was born on 13 July 1750 in Saint-Martin du Gua into a family of modest means, and joined France's merchant navy before enlisting in the French Navy as a suppleant frigate lieutenant in 1779. Renaudin served on the fluyt Dorade, on which he took part in four battles of the American Revolutionary War. On 1 May 1786, Renaudin was promoted to ship-of-the-line sub-lieutenant. During the French Revolution, Renaudin was promoted to ship-of-the-line lieutenant on 1 January 1792, and to ship-of-the-line captain on 1 January 1793; he was appointed to command the 20-gun corvette Perdrix, cruising off Belle-Ile and Rochefort. He later transferred to the frigate Andromaque, on which sustained a fight against a ship of the line and four Spanish frigates.

=== The Vengeur du Peuple at the Glorious First of June ===
Vengeur du Peuple (right) under Renaudin at the Glorious First of June

Renaudin commanded the Vengeur du Peuple in the fleet of Counter-admiral Louis Thomas Villaret de Joyeuse. Exiting Brest, Vengeur was separated from her fleet, which prevented her from taking part in the action of 29 May 1794; on the next day, however, she sustained fire from ten British ships while preventing them from cutting the French line of battle. On the next day, at the Glorious First of June, Renaudin led a fierce battle against HMS Brunswick, in which Brunswick and Vengeur disabled each other. As Vengeur could not be rescued by French frigates, Renaudin asked for help from the British.

Renaudin was rescued by HMS Culloden and abandoned his ship with the first British boat, leaving his men behind in disregard for military customs and the 1765 standing order that Captains had to be last to abandon ship,. Though his account of the event insinuated that he was on a boat close to Vengeur when she foundered, he was in fact dining in the mess of Culloden at the moment of the sinking. Taken in captivity in Tavistock, he wrote an account of the fight of Vengeur on 1 Messidor an II (19 June 1794), signed and had it co-signed by his staff, comprising, Jean Hugine, Louis Rousseau, Pelet, Trouvée, Lussot and others.

In France, Renaudin was assumed to be dead, and promoted to counter admiral on 29 August 1794. His return astonished the convention on 10 September 1794, when Jean-Jacques Bréard stated:

I am very pleased to tell the Convention that the whole of the crew of Vengeur did not perish (applause). The captain has returned to Brest and has been promoted to the command of the Jemmapes. On this ship, he hopes to repair the loss of Vengeur (applause).

Nevertheless, in 1847, Alphonse de Lamartine wrote a description where Renaudin was killed, cut in half by a cannon shot like Dupetit-Thouars, and Adolphe Thiers later wrote an account repeating Barère's version, where Vengeur refused to surrender. Remarkably, neither the national Archives, nor the archives of the Navy, nor the archives of the War Council nor Renaudin's personal file mention any court-martial that should have been held automatically for the loss of the ship, in accordance with French law.

=== Later life ===
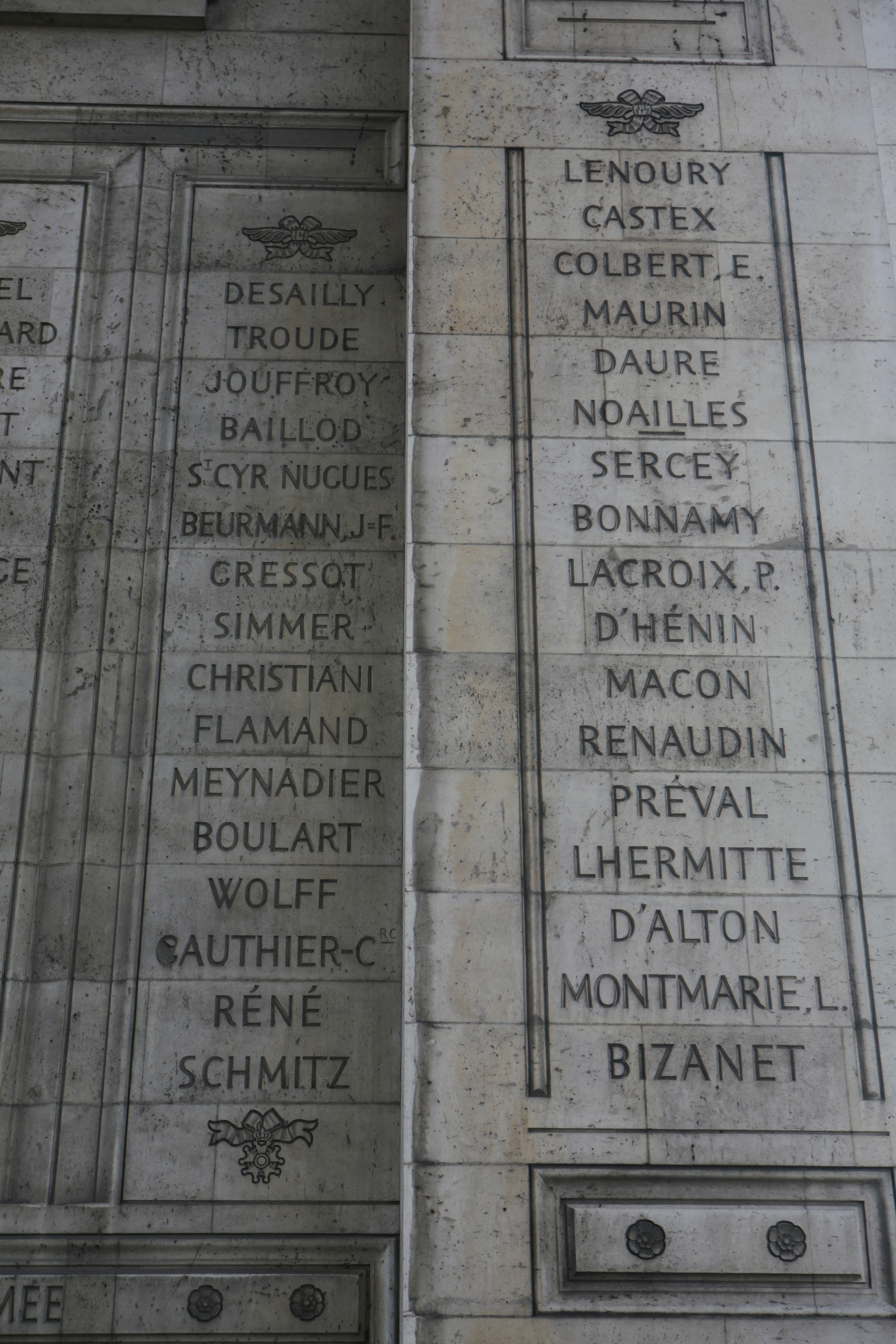
Renaudin's name on the Arc de Triomphe

Renaudin was promoted to counter admiral on 29 August 1794, purportedly a posthumous honour, before being exchanged. He was put in command of Jemmapes before obtaining command of the 3rd Squadron of the naval army of the Ocean (the Brest fleet under Admiral Martin), a 6-ship division, on 29 October 1794, with his flag on Jemmapes. In late February 1795, Renaudin's division left Brest to reinforce the naval forces of Toulon, where it arrived on 3 April 1795.

On 24 March 1798, Renaudin was appointed to the 2nd squadron of the Brest fleet, succeeding Admiral Lelarge. From 21 March 1799, he commanded the naval forces of Naples, before moving to Toulon to become the senior officer of the garrison on 25 May 1799, replacing Jean Gaspard Vence who had fallen in disfavour after an altercation with Bruix. On 23 September 1799, Renaudin became general inspector of oceanic harbours from Cherbourg to Bayonne,. He retired on 4 April 1801, and died in Le Gua.

== Honours ==
- Renaudin's name is engraved on the Arc de Triomphe (40th column).
- Three ships of the French navy named Renaudin in his honour.
