= Jean-Amable Lelarge =

Jean-Amable Lelarge (Louisbourg, 17 April 1738 — Plabennec, 21 March 1805) was an Acadian sailor. He served as an officer and admiral in the French Navy during the French Revolutionary Wars.

== Biography ==
During the Quibéron mutinies, Lelarge was on the 110-gun Bretagne, with Captain Richery as flag officer. Représentant en mission Jeanbon Saint-André and Prieur de la Marne relieved him of duty after the incident.

In April 1796, Lelarge was a Rear Admiral and was posted in the harbour of Rochefort. When HMS Révolutionnaire, under Captain Edward Pellew, captured Unité, he also captured Lelarge's wife and one of his sons, who served as an officier on Unité. He released them on a cartel.

Lelarge was in command of the 2nd squadron of the Brest fleet until 24 March 1798, when Jean François Renaudin replaced him.

== Notes and references ==
Notes

Bibliography

- Forrer, Claude (June 1996). "La Bretagne, vaisseau de 100 canons, 1762-1796". Neptunia (202): 13-21.
- Hennequin, Joseph François Gabriel (1835). Biographie maritime ou notices historiques sur la vie et les campagnes des marins célèbres français et étrangers (in French). Vol. 3. Paris: Regnault éditeur.
- Levot, Prosper (1866). Les gloires maritimes de la France: notices biographiques sur les plus célèbres marins (in French). Bertrand.
- Troude, Onésime-Joachim (1867). Batailles navales de la France (in French). Vol. 2. Challamel ainé.
