= Croisière du Grand Hiver =

1794 naval battle

- Part of the War of the First Coalition
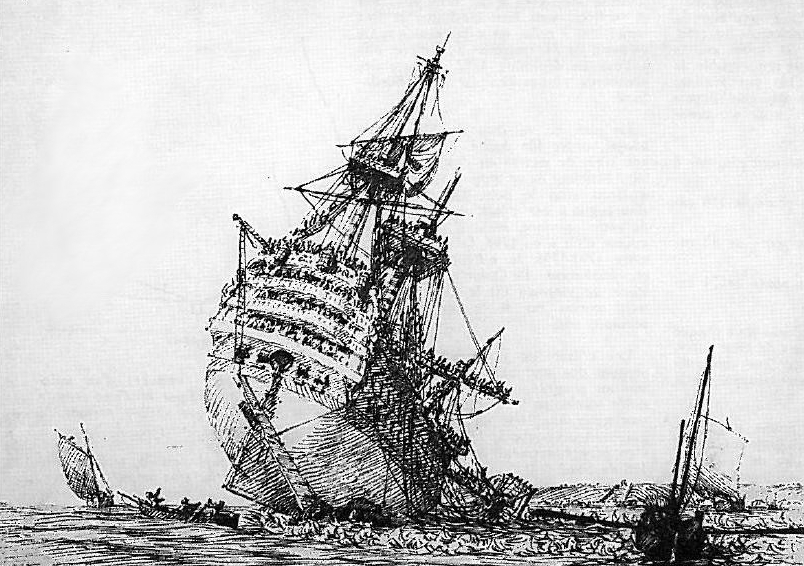
- Républicain grounded on 24 December during the campaign
- Location: Atlantic Ocean
- Planned by: National Convention
- Objective: Cruise the Atlantic Ocean, challenge the Royal Navy for command of the sea and attack British merchant shipping
- Date: 24 December 1794 – 3 February 1795
- Executed by: French Navy
- Outcome: French failure

The Croisière du Grand Hiver (French "Campaign of the Great Winter") was a naval campaign carried out by the French Navy during the War of the First Coalition. Ordered by the National Convention in the wake of the French navy's tactical defeat at the Glorious First of June, the campaign was intended to challenge the Royal Navy for command of the sea. The French fleet in Brest, under Vice-admiral Louis Thomas Villaret de Joyeuse, was ordered to cruise the Atlantic Ocean and attack British merchant shipping; the fleet set sail on 24 December 1794.

As Villaret's fleet was in poor condition, with many ships being in a state of disrepair and lacking adequate supplies, the campaign quickly became disastrous as many French warships were mauled by bad weather. The fleet regrouped in Brest on 3 February 1795, having captured 70 merchantmen along with a British post ship. However, as a result of poor weather the French navy lost five ships of the line outright along with several more warships being damaged, further weakening its ability to challenge the Royal Navy.

== Background ==
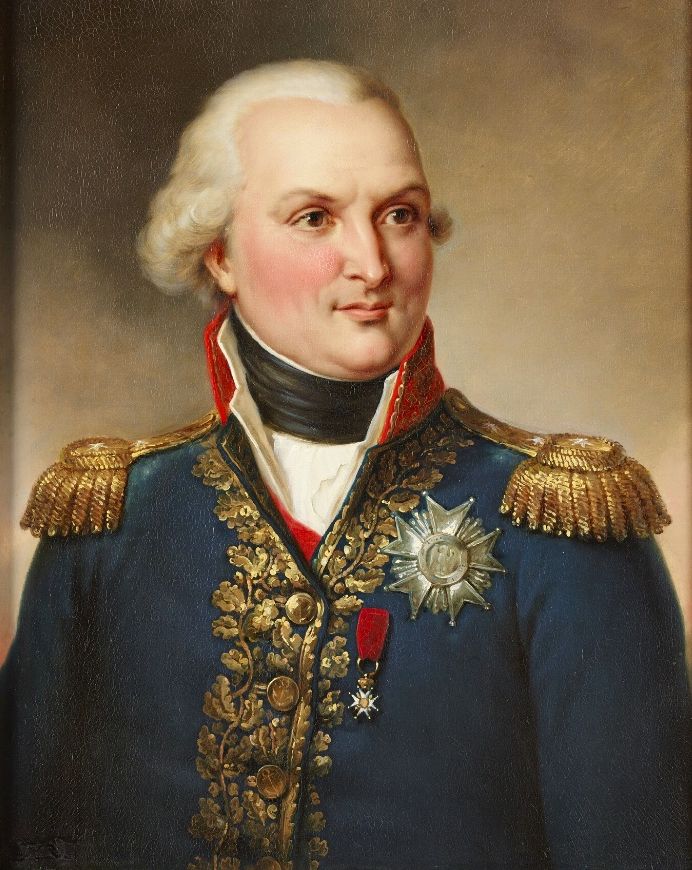
Villaret de Joyeuse, the campaign's commander

The Glorious First of June fought on 1 June 1794 had ended on a strategic success for the French Navy, but on the tactical level it had suffered its greatest defeat since the Battles of Barfleur and La Hogue. In late 1794, the National Convention ordered a squadron under Counter-admiral Jean François Renaudin, who had been recently promoted for his defence of Vengeur du Peuple during the Glorious First of June, to transport ammunition from Brest to Toulon. Renaudin's squadron consisted of six ships of the line, three frigates and one corvette. Vice-admiral Louis Thomas Villaret de Joyeuse was ordered to sail his fleet out of Brest to escort Renaudin in the Bay of Biscay, cruise the bay for a fortnight, and then return to Brest while sending a squadron of six ships of the line and three frigates to Guadeloupe. Villaret's fleet was in poor shape, with many of his ships in a state of disrepair and lacking supplies. Following several unsuccessful attempts, the fleet departed on 24 December 1794.

== Campaign ==
During the manoeuvers for the departure of the fleet, the 110-gun Républicain broke her anchor cable and, at 17:30, before she could set sails, she touched Mingant rock. Before manoeuvers could be attempted, she began to sustain damage to her hull and take in water. Despite throwing her guns overboard she proved impossible to refloat and settled on the rock as water flooded into her hull. As her boats had been damaged or torn off it was impossible to evacuate, and with the heavy sea it was not until 9:00 the next day that Fougueux arrived on the scene and could send boats over to rescue the crew. Eventually, only 10 men drowned, while the rest were rescued. Redoutable also broke her cables, but managed to reach the open sea, followed by the frigate Vertu. In the afternoon of the 29th, the 35 ships of the fleet regrouped off Camaret-sur-Mer, and set sail the next day.

The heavy sea of 1 January damaged several of the ships. Nestor lost a mast and had to double back to Brest. Téméraire sustained hull damage and started leaking. The next day, as the weather improved, Counter-admiral Pierre Jean Van Stabel led a light squadron which detached from the fleet and turned to the North-West, but after a few hours a deep fog set in and he lost contact with the rest of the fleet. Neptune, which had been delayed upon departure by damage to her capstan, also lost the fleet and joined the light squadron on the 31st, along with three frigates and two corvettes. They would not rejoin the fleet until 24 January. Three British frigates, HMS Diamond, HMS Flora and HMS Arethusa had been dispatched on 2 January to investigate the French activity. Diamond, under the command of Captain Sidney Smith, raised a French flag when challenged by the fleet, which allowed her to sail on. Later, she encountered a stranded ship, whose captain hailed Diamond, during which the French captain stated his ship was the Nestor. Smith, who was fluent in French, conversed with the French officers and acquire significant insights of the French intentions. Diamond sailed into Brest harbour on the 3rd to confirm this information.

Neptune had suffered considerably from the bad weather, to the point that her captain had warned Van Stabel. On January 25, another leak forced Neptune to tack so as not to expose the affected section of her hull to water, and to send distress signals. For five days, most of the crew pumped water out of the ship and dropped the guns, ammunition and anchors overboard, until the 28th, at 12:30, when she reached Perros-Guirec and ran aground. 50 men were found dead in the hull, while the rest of the crew evacuated the ship. On January 28, a storm broke out, and caused further damage to several ships. The leakage on Téméraire had become so worrisome that she doubled back to Brest, but lost her way en route and finally arrived in Saint-Malo.

After a few days of cruise, Neuf Thermidor had lost her stem, forcing captain Dorré to cut away the bowsprit and the upper foremast, and drop his anchors and upper battery overboard. By 29 January, pumps could not compensate for leakage. In the night, the ship rolled so much that the yards of the mainmast fell, destroying three pumps; from then on, the ship lowered in the water, and when the lower battery touched the waves, Majestueux and Marat sent boats over to evacuate the crew. Neuf Thermidor was deserted by 4:00 on the 31st, and she foundered around 7:00. Superbe suffered the same fate. She had started to take in water on the 26th, and Captain Colomb had warned Villaret that his ship was sinking. Efforts to pump out water could not compensate for the leakage, even after throwing the artillery overboard, and on 30th, Villaret ordered the ship abandoned. Montagne, Montagnard and Papillon rescued the crew, but 21 men were lost.

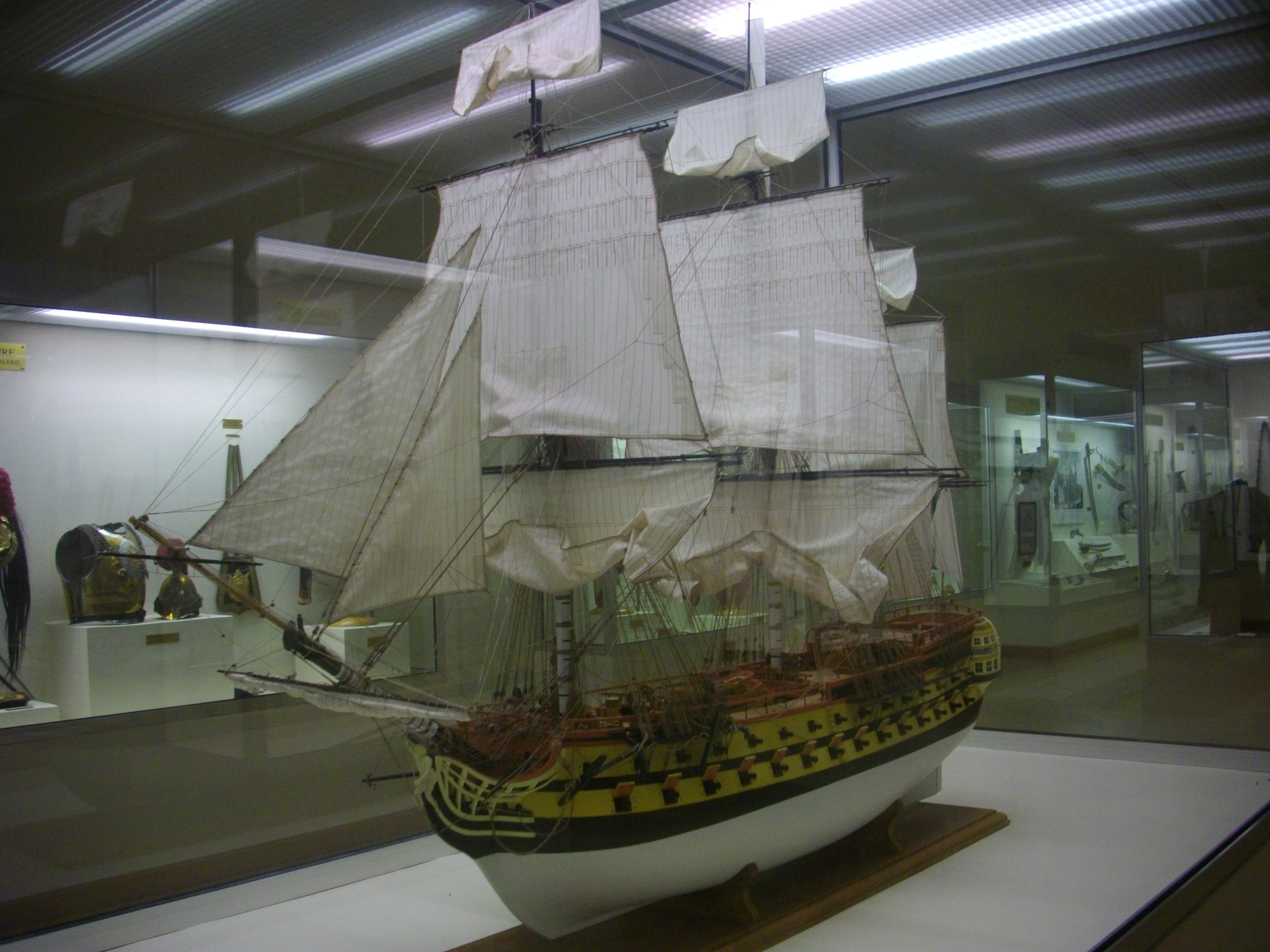
Ship model of Neptune, which was lost during the campaign

Scipion, an old ship that was scheduled for decommissioning, started slowly disintegrating soon after she left the harbour. By the 25th, her pumps could not keep ahead of the leakage, and Montagnard, Trente-et-un-Mai and Railleuse had been tasked to watch her. After an attempt to wrap her with cables failed, Captain Huguet requested and obtained permission to return to port, escorted by Trente-et-un-Mai. In the afternoon, the main topmast failed, breaking the main yard, which penetrated the deck vertically and broke two of the nine pumps; its leverage further contributed to the dismantling of the ship. At 16:00, Huguet requested assistance from Trente-et-un-Mai, which evacuated the crew in spite of a heavy sea. The ship was abandoned by 3:15 the next morning. Convention lost her rudder and was towed back to Lorient by Pelletier.

On 3 February, Villaret's fleet regrouped in Brest, having captured 70 merchantmen as well as the 20-gun British post ship HMS Daphne. However, the French had lost five ships of the line and several other warships had sustained severe damage. Renaudin's squadron had to delay its mission to reach Toulon in order to support Villaret's fleet. Renaudin eventually departed for Toulon on 22 February with the ships of the line Jemmapes, Montagnard, Trente-et-un-Mai, Aquilon, Tyrannicide and Révolution, the frigates Courageuse, Embuscade, Félicité and the corvette Unité. They also suffered from heavy seas and strong westerly winds; Trente-et-un-Mai lost her mizzen and her main topmast when she entered the Mediterranean, and had to be taken in tow by Tyrannicide. Renaudin's squadron nevertheless reached Toulon safely on 2 April.

Routes of the squadrons
Route of the main squadron under Villaret

Route of the light squadron under Van Stabel

== Aftermath ==
Overall, the campaign was a disaster for the French navy because of the heavy losses it sustained despite the lack of attacks from the Royal Navy, and especially since damaged ships could not easily be repaired with the endemic shortage of material in French arsenals. The French Navy's effort to contest control of the seas with the British were heavily impaired by the campaign's failure. Another attempt at a winter cruise was made during the French expedition to Ireland in December 1796, in which the French lost 12 warships.

== Sources and references ==
=== Bibliography ===
- Batailles navales de la France, Onésime-Joachim Troude, Challamel ainé, 1867, vol. 2, pp. 404–409
- James, William (2002) [1827]. The Naval History of Great Britain, Volume 1. Conway Maritime Press. ISBN 0-85177-909-3. pp. 233 and following
