= Le Gua, Charente-Maritime =

Le Gua
- Commune
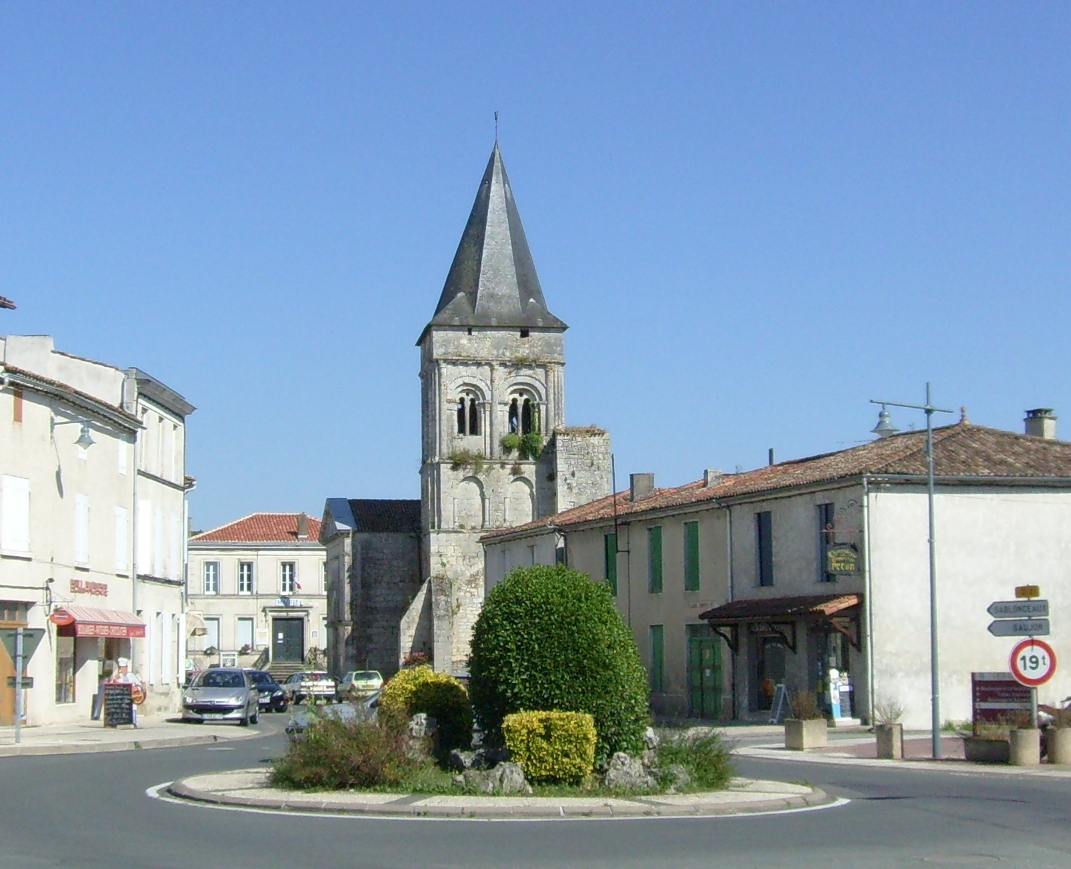
- The village of Le Gua

- Coat of arms
- Location of Le Gua
- Location within France Location within Nouvelle-Aquitaine
- Coordinates: 45°43′34″N 0°56′37″W
- Country: France
- Region: Nouvelle-Aquitaine
- Department: Charente-Maritime
- Arrondissement: Rochefort
- Canton: Marennes
- Intercommunality: Bassin de Marennes

Government
  - Mayor (2020–2026): Patrice Brouhard
- Area^{1}: 36.09 km^{2} (13.93 sq mi)
- Highest elevation: 32 m (105 ft)
- Lowest elevation: 0 m (0 ft)
- Population (2023): 2,129
  - Density: 58.99/km^{2} (152.8/sq mi)
- Time zone: UTC+01:00 (CET)
  - Summer (DST): UTC+02:00 (CEST)
- INSEE/Postal code: 17185 /17600
- ^{1} French Land Register data, which excludes lakes, ponds, glaciers > 1 km^{2} (0.386 sq mi or 247 acres) and river estuaries.

Le Gua (French pronunciation: [lə ɡa]) is a commune in the Charente-Maritime department in southwestern France.

== Population ==
Historical population

Year	Pop.	±% p.a.
1793	1,583	—
1800	1,634	+0.45%
1806	1,221	−4.74%
1821	1,543	+1.57%
1831	2,815	+6.20%
1836	2,056	−6.09%
1841	2,074	+0.17%
1846	2,097	+0.22%
1851	2,080	−0.16%
1856	2,064	−0.15%
1861	2,114	+0.48%
1866	2,026	−0.85%
1872	1,881	−1.23%
1876	1,841	−0.54%
1881	1,876	+0.38%
1886	1,891	+0.16%
1891	1,759	−1.44%
1896	1,652	−1.25%
1901	1,556	−1.19%

Year	Pop.	±% p.a.
1906	1,590	+0.43%
1911	1,545	−0.57%
1921	1,344	−1.38%
1926	1,377	+0.49%
1931	1,339	−0.56%
1936	1,279	−0.91%
1946	1,222	−0.45%
1954	1,381	+1.54%
1962	1,434	+0.47%
1968	1,513	+0.90%
1975	1,395	−1.15%
1982	1,491	+0.96%
1990	1,689	+1.57%
1999	1,856	+1.05%
2007	1,989	+0.87%
2012	2,065	+0.75%
2017	2,097	+0.31%
2023	2,129	+0.25%

Source: EHESS and INSEE (1968-2023)

== See also ==
- Communes of the Charente-Maritime department
