= French ship Auguste (1778) =

Ship of the line of the French Navy

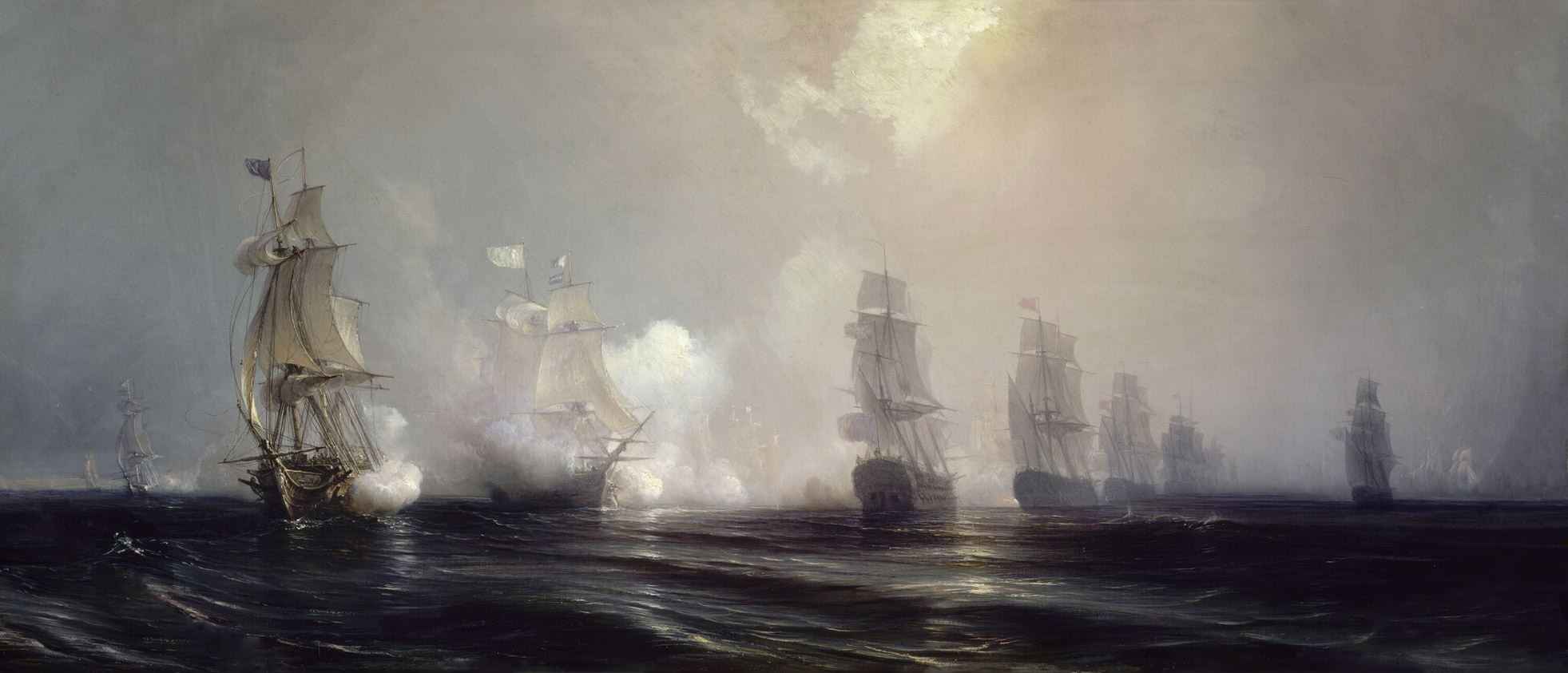
- Auguste fighting at the Battle of the Chesapeake

History

France
- Name: Auguste
- Namesake: Augustus, Jacobin Club, Thermidorian Reaction
- Builder: Brest
- Laid down: December 1777
- Launched: 18 September 1778
- In service: March 1779
- Fate: Foundered off Brest on 29 January 1795, most hands lost.

General characteristics
- Type: 80-gun ship of the line
- Displacement: 3,850 tonneaux
- Tons burthen: 2,100 port tonneaux
- Length: 60.4 m (198 ft)
- Beam: 14.9 m (49 ft)
- Draught: 7.8 m (26 ft)
- Propulsion: Sail
- Sail plan: Full-rigged ship
- Complement: 780
- Armament: 80 guns: 32 24-pounder long guns; 30 18-pounder long guns; 22 8-pounder long guns
- Armour: Timber

Auguste was an 80-gun ship of the line in the French Navy, laid down in 1777 and in active service from 1779. She took part in the Naval operations in the American Revolutionary War and later in the French Revolutionary Wars, notably fighting at the Glorious First of June. She was lost with most hands during the Croisière du Grand Hiver in January 1795.

== Service ==
Soon after her commissioning, from June to September 1779, Auguste patroles the Channel under Captain de Rochechouart. She took part in the Battle of St. Lucia, the Battle of Fort Royal and the Battle of the Chesapeake under Captain Castellan, as flagship of the Blue-and-White squadron under Chef d'Escadre Bougainville. She was also at the Battle of the Saintes on 12 April 1782. In 1793, she was renamed Jacobin and was part of the Brest squadron. She was involved in the Quibéron mutinies in September 1793.

The next year, she took part in the Glorious First of June, where she followed the flagship Montagne, and failed to prevent HMS Queen Charlotte from breaking the French line. In December 1794, she was renamed Neuf Thermidor. On 29 January, as she took part in the Croisière du Grand Hiver, she was caught in a tempest off Brest and wrecked with the loss of most of her crew.
