= French expedition to Ireland (1796) =

Expedition of the War of the First Coalition

- Part of the War of the First Coalition
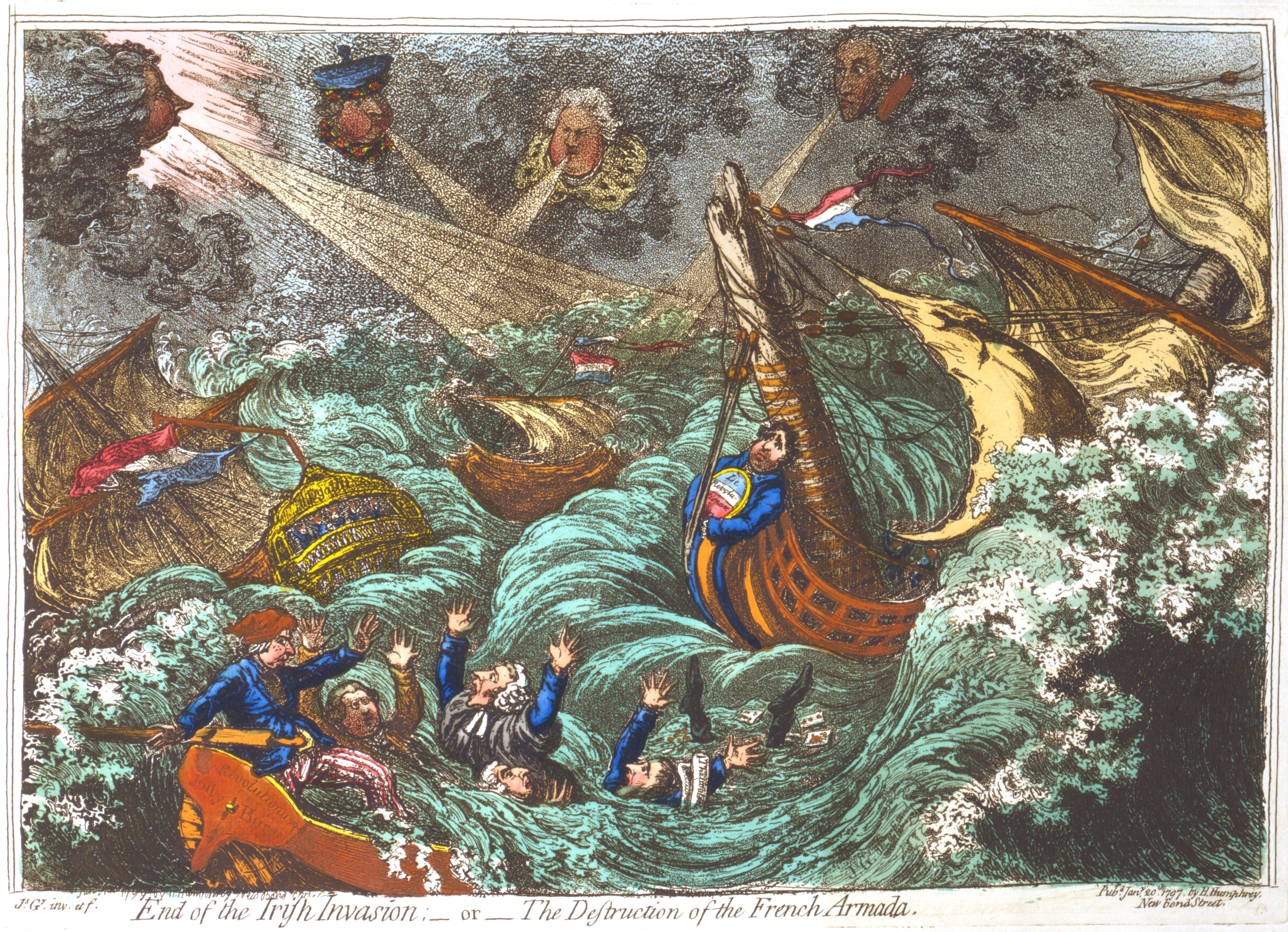
- 1797 cartoon by James Gillray mocking the expedition's failure
Date	December 1796 – January 1797
Location	Atlantic Ocean 51.6°N 9.8°W
Result	British victory

Belligerents
Ireland; Great Britain	France

Commanders and leaders
Robert Kingsmill; Edward Pellew	Lazare Hoche; Morard de Galles

Strength
13 warships	12,000–25,000 troops; 17 ships of the line; 13 frigates; 6 corvettes; 7 troopships

Casualties and losses
Unknown	2,230 killed or drowned; 1,000 captured; 2 ships of the line wrecked; 1 frigate captured; 2 frigates scuttled; 1 frigate wrecked; 1 corvette captured; 4 troopships captured; 1 troopship sunk
- Location within Europe

The French expedition to Ireland, known in French as the Expédition d'Irlande (French pronunciation: [ɛkspedisjɔ̃ diʁlɑ̃d], "Expedition to Ireland"), was an unsuccessful attempt by the French Republic to assist the outlawed Society of United Irishmen in their planned rebellion against British rule during the War of the First Coalition. France intended to land a large expeditionary force in Ireland during the winter of 1796–1797 which would join forces with the United Irishmen and overthrow British rule in Ireland. The French anticipated that a successful invasion would not only be a major blow to British morale, prestige and military effectiveness but allow for Ireland to serve as a staging point for an eventual invasion of Britain. In late 1796, the French Directory gathered a force of between 12,000 and 25,000 French Revolutionary Army troops at Brest under General Lazare Hoche in readiness for a landing at Bantry Bay in December.

The operation was launched during one of the stormiest winters of the 18th century, which the French navy was unprepared to deal with. Patrolling British frigates observed the departure of the fleet and notified the Royal Navy's Channel Fleet, most of which was sheltering at Spithead for the winter. The French invasion fleet was subject to confused orders as it left port and was scattered across the approaches to Brest: one ship was wrecked with heavy loss of life and the others widely dispersed. Separated, most of the invasion fleet managed to reach Bantry Bay late in December, but its commanders were driven miles off course and without them the fleet was unsure of what action to take, with amphibious landings impossible due to the weather conditions, which were the worst recorded since 1708. Within a week the fleet had broken up, with small squadrons and individual ships making their way back to Brest through storms, fog and British patrols.

British warships were largely unable to interfere with the French invasion fleet due in part to the bad weather. A few vessels operating from Cork captured isolated French warships and transports, but the only significant British response came from Captain Sir Edward Pellew, who was able to force the wrecking of the French ship of the line Droits de l'Homme in the action of 13 January 1797. The expedition proved to be a major disaster for the French, who lost 12 warships and troopships along with thousands of troops and sailors without a single man reaching Ireland except as prisoners of war. Both the French and British navies were criticised by their governments for their behaviour during the campaign, but the French were encouraged to launch a second attempt during the Irish Rebellion of 1798, successfully landing 2,000 men in August. However, the second expedition proved just as unsuccessful as the first and ultimately resulted in the destruction of the United Irishmen and the end of further French attempts to invade Ireland.

== Background ==
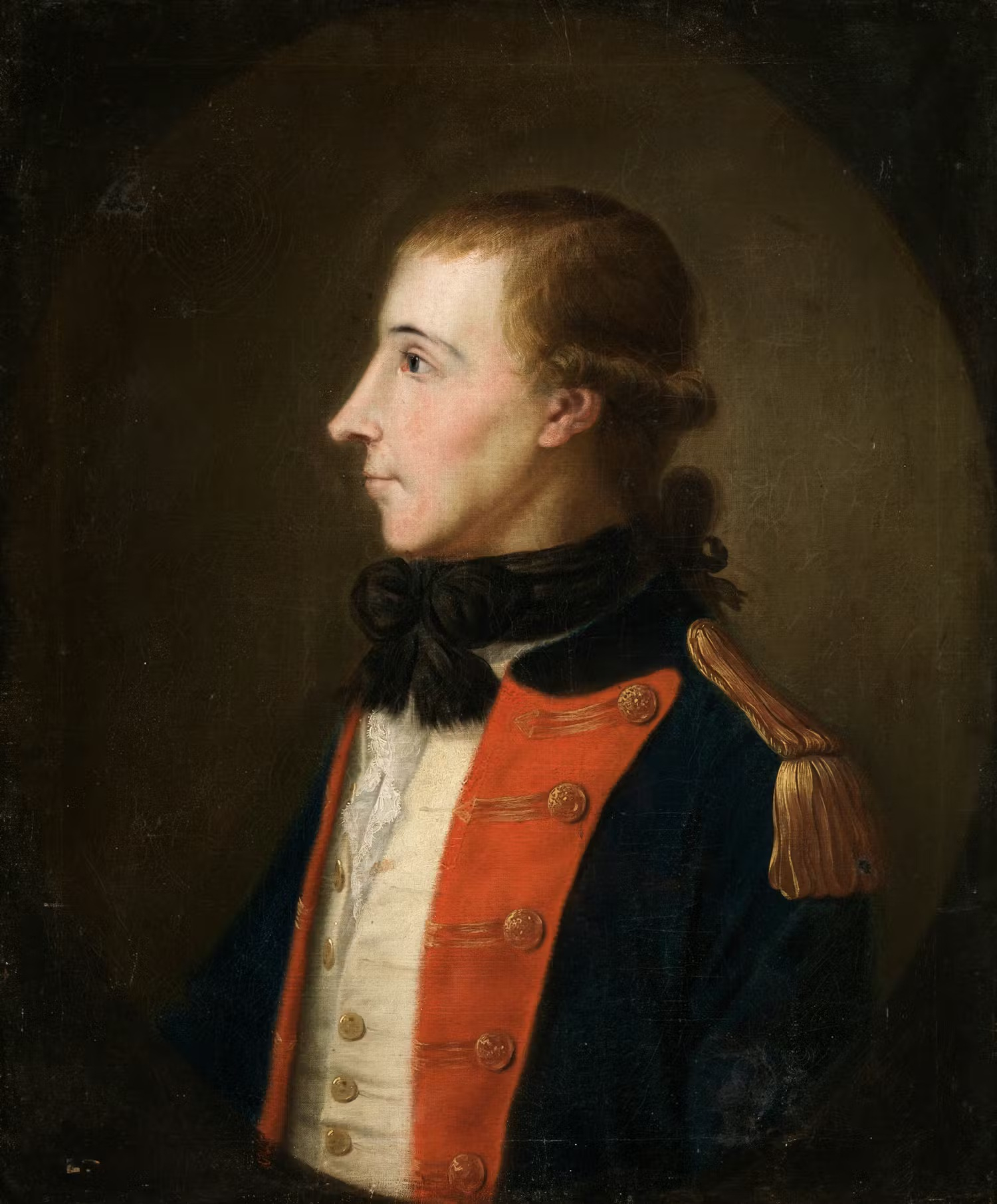
Wolfe Tone, who went to France and assisted in the expedition's planning

The French Revolution which began in 1789 spread support for republicanism across Europe. One of the countries most affected was the Kingdom of Ireland, a client state of Great Britain. Opposition to British rule in Ireland had existed for centuries, but the French Revolution combined with hostility towards the penal laws which discriminated against the Catholic majority and a large Presbyterian minority prompted the creation of the Society of United Irishmen, a broad non-sectarian coalition of groups seeking to create an independent Irish republic.

Initially non-violent, the United Irishmen were forced to operate as a secret society after membership was made illegal by the Dublin Castle administration in 1793 due to the War of the First Coalition. Deciding that their only hope of creating an Irish republic lay in armed revolt, the United Irishmen began secretly organising and arming their members. In search of external aid, two of their leaders, Lord Edward FitzGerald and Arthur O'Connor, travelled to Basel to meet with French Divisional-general Lazare Hoche. Their efforts were supported by Wolfe Tone, another United Irishmen leader who travelled to Paris to appeal to the French Directory in person. During this period, the British government repealed several penal laws in an attempt to quell unrest in Ireland.

France had long planned to invade the British Isles, but such ambitions had been repeatedly thwarted by several factors, including being occupied by other wartime fronts, the War in the Vendée and the poor state of the French Navy. The final problem was a major cause for concern: several French naval officers had either been executed or went into exile due to the Revolution and the Navy itself had endured a series of military setbacks, culminating in a tactical defeat at the Glorious First of June in 1794 and the disastrous Croisière du Grand Hiver in 1795. After securing peace on several fronts in 1795, the new French Directory decided that Britain was one of their most dangerous remaining opponents and determined that only an invasion could knock the British out of the war.

The applications from Tone intrigued the Directory, which understood that by attacking Ireland they would be striking at the least defensible part of the British Isles. Support for the British Crown was weakest there and the United Irishmen optimistically claimed to be able to raise an irregular army of as many as 250,000 men to join the French once they had landed, with the additional attraction that a successful establishment of an Irish republic would prove an ideological coup for the French Republic. Finally and most significantly, a large expeditionary force in Ireland could provide an ideal springboard for an invasion of Britain, especially in combination with a plan then under development to land 2,000 troops in Cornwall, who would distract the British during the planned invasion of Ireland and could potentially provide a beachhead for future operations.

== Preparation ==
With the end of the War in the Vendée and peace with Spain, substantial French troops were made available for the planned invasion, which was to be led by Hoche and scheduled for the end of October 1796. Hoche was an experienced officer who had defeated the Vendée Royalists and subsequently planned an invasion of Cornwall. Thousands of veteran troops and the French Navy's entire Atlantic Squadron, which was based in the major Atlantic seaport of Brest were placed at his disposal. The number of troops earmarked for the invasion is uncertain; the Directory suggested 25,000 men would be required, while the United Irishmen delegates insisting that 15,000 would be sufficient. Estimates of the number of troops eventually embarked range between 12,000 and 25,000.^{[Note A]}

By August the plan was already behind schedule: severe shortages of stores and wages slowed work at the Brest shipyards, while the troops set aside for the invasion of Cornwall proved unreliable, deserting in large numbers. A practice voyage carried out by the Cornish invasion fleet ended in total failure, as the small ships intended for the operation proved unable to operate in open water. The plan to invade Cornwall was abandoned, with the reliable troops from the invasion army being reassigned to the Irish invasion force and the rest returned to prison. Reinforcements from the French Navy's Mediterranean Squadron were also delayed: a seven-ship squadron under Counter-admiral Joseph de Richery was forced to shelter in Rochefort to avoid British blockaders, only arriving in Brest on 8 December, while a second squadron under Counter-admiral Pierre-Charles Villeneuve did not arrive until after the Irish invasion force had departed.

Throughout late 1796, progress on the expedition faltered. Hoche publicly blamed the French Navy and singled out Vice-admiral Louis Thomas Villaret de Joyeuse for the delay, whom he accused of being more interested in the planning of a proposed invasion of British India. In October, Villaret was replaced by Vice-admiral Justin Bonaventure Morard de Galles and the planned invasion of British India were cancelled, while Hoche was placed in command of overseeing efforts to maintain discipline within the invasion fleet. By the second week of December the invasion fleet, consisting of 17 ships of the line, 13 frigates, six corvettes and seven troopships, was ready to depart. Several troopships had been created by removing the cannons from old frigates to maximise cargo space. Each ship of the line carried 600 troops, the frigates 250 and the transports approximately 400. The invasion army comprised a mixture of infantry, cavalry and field artillery units, and the invasion fleet carried substantial military stores which were intended to arm Irish volunteers and rebels. Hoche was still dissatisfied, informing the Directory on 8 December that he would rather lead his men in any other operation than the planned invasion of Ireland. He was supported by de Galles, who admitted that his men were so inexperienced at sea that encounters with the British should be avoided wherever possible.

== Departure ==
Despite the misgivings of the expedition's commanders, the fleet left Brest as scheduled on 15 December 1796, one day ahead of a message from the Directory calling off the entire operation. De Galles knew that the British would be watching Brest harbour: their frigates were a constant presence as part of the Inshore Squadron of the blockade. In an effort to disguise his force's intentions, he first anchored in Camaret Bay and issued orders for his ships to pass through the Raz de Sein. The Raz was a dangerous narrow channel littered with rocks and sandbanks and subject to heavy surf during bad weather, but would also obscure the size, strength and direction of the French fleet from the British squadron offshore, which French scouts claimed consisted of 30 ships.

Despite the French reports, the principal British blockade squadron was absent from the approaches to Brest during the night of 15 December. Most of the fleet had retired to one of the British channel ports to avoid the winter storms, while the remaining squadron under Rear-Admiral John Colpoys had been forced to retreat 40 nautical miles (74 km) into the Atlantic to avoid the risk of being driven onto the rocky French Biscay shoreline during a storm. The only British ships within sight of Brest were a frigate squadron, consisting of HMS Indefatigable, HMS Amazon, HMS Phoebe, HMS Révolutionnaire and the lugger HMS Duke of York, under the command of Captain Sir Edward Pellew in Indefatigable. Pellew had noted French preparations on 11 December and immediately sent Phoebe to warn Colpoys and Amazon to Falmouth, to alert the Admiralty. He remained off Brest with the rest of the squadron, and sighted the main French fleet at 15:30 on 15 December, bringing his frigates inshore towards Camaret Bay to establish its size and purpose. At 15:30 on 16 December, the French sailed from the Bay, Pellew observing closely and despatching Revolutionnaire to assist in the search for Colpoys.

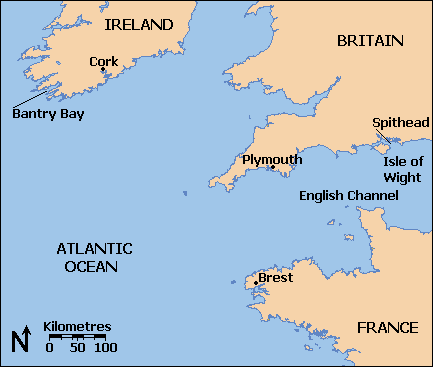
The Western Approaches. The French fleet was scattered across this area during the campaign.

Morard de Galles had spent most of 16 December preparing for passage through the Raz de Sein, situating temporary lightships in the channel to warn of hazards and giving instructions on the use of signal rockets during the passage. The fleet was so delayed in this work that darkness began to fall before preparations were complete and he abandoned the plan at approximately 16:00 and signalled for the fleet to leave via the main channel from the port, leading the way in his flagship, the frigate Fraternité. It was so dark by the time the signal was made that most ships failed to see it, Fraternité and the corvette Atalante attempting to notify them by rocket signal. These signals were confusing and many ships failed to understand, sailing for the Raz de Sein rather than the main channel. Pellew added to the problem by weaving ahead of the fleet shining blue lights and firing rockets, further confusing the French captains as to their location.

When dawn broke on 17 December, most of the French fleet was scattered across the approaches to Brest. The largest intact group was that under Vice-admiral François Joseph Bouvet, which had come through the Raz de Sein with nine ships of the line, six frigates and one transport. The other ships, including Fraternité, which also carried General Hoche, were alone or in small groups; the captains forced open their secret orders to discover their destination, in the absence of instructions from any commanding officers. One ship had been lost; the 74-gun ship of the line Séduisant had driven onto the Grand Stevenent rock during the night and sank with the loss of 680 lives. She too had fired numerous rockets and signal guns in an effort to attract attention, succeeding only in compounding the confusion in the fleet. Pellew, unable now to affect the large French force, sailed for Falmouth to telegraph his report to the Admiralty and replenish his supplies.

== Voyage to Ireland ==
By 19 December, Bouvet had gathered 33 ships together and set a course for Mizen Head in southern Ireland, the designated rendezvous point where he was instructed by his sealed orders to wait five days for further instructions from France. One of the ships still missing was the Fraternité. Despite the disappearance of its commanders the French fleet continued to Bantry Bay, sailing through both high winds and thick fog, which delayed its arrival until 21 December. While Bouvet sailed for Ireland, Fraternité crossed the Western Approaches in search of the fleet, accompanied by Nestor, Romaine and Cocarde. Unwittingly passing Bouvet's fleet in the fog, de Galles separated from his small squadron near the rendezvous on 21 December, only to discover a British frigate immediately ahead. Retreating from the threat, Fraternité was chased far into the Atlantic before she could escape the unidentified pursuer. On the return journey de Galle found the winds against him, and it took eight days to regain Mizen Head.

Phoebe did not find Colpoys until 19 December, deep in the Bay of Biscay. The following day he sighted the delayed French squadron under Villeneuve and gave chase, but Villeneuve was able to outrun Colpoys' pursuit in a gale, reaching Lorient ahead of the British, whose ships were badly damaged by the storm. Unable to continue operations, Colpoys was forced to retreat to Spithead for repairs. The response from the Channel Fleet under Lord Bridport was similarly ineffective. News of the French departure from Brest did not arrive in Plymouth, the most westerly of the British fleet ports, until 20 December. Many of Bridport's ships, based at Spithead, were not ready for sea and it was several days before enough vessels were manned and equipped for service. The order to leave port was issued on 25 December, but the fleet was almost immediately thrown into chaos when the large second-rate HMS Prince swung out of control and collided with the 80-gun HMS Sans Pareil. At almost the same time, another second-rate, HMS Formidable, was driven into the 100-gun first-rate HMS Ville de Paris by strong winds while the 98-gun HMS Atlas grounded. All five ships were required to enter dock for extensive repairs, denying Bridport his strongest vessels and delaying his departure further. When he eventually reached St Helens, the departure point from the Solent, the wind was blowing from the west and his remaining eight ships were rendered immobile until 3 January.

In the absence of Morard de Galles and Hoche, Bouvet and his army counterpart, General Emmanuel de Grouchy, gave orders on 21 December for the fleet to anchor in preparation for landings the following day. Local maritime pilots, believing the fleet to be British, rowed out to the ships and were seized, providing the French with guides to the best landing sites. During the night of 21 December, the weather suddenly and significantly worsened, Atlantic gales bringing blizzards that hid the shoreline and forced the fleet to anchor or risk being wrecked. They remained in the Bay for four days in the coldest winter recorded since 1708. The inexperienced French sailors, lacking any winter clothing, were unable to operate their ships. On shore, local militia forces were marshaled by local landowner Richard White, taking positions in anticipation of the French landing. On 24 December the wind slackened and a council of war was convened among the expedition's senior officers. Together they resolved to force a landing despite the weather, identifying a nearby creek as the safest point and giving orders for the operation to go ahead at first light on 25 December. During the night the weather deteriorated once more, and by morning the waves were so violent that they were breaking over the bows of many ships. Anchors dragged and a number of vessels were blown right out of the Bay and into the Atlantic, unable to return against the wind. In the storm, the largest ship of the line, the Indomptable, collided with the frigate Résolue and both suffered severe damage. HMS Monarch, flagship of Vice-Admiral Sir George Elphinstone returning from the successful Invasion of the Cape Colony, was battered by the storm and passed right through the French fleet without realising the danger, anchoring in a disabled state at Crookhaven.

=== Collapse of the expedition ===
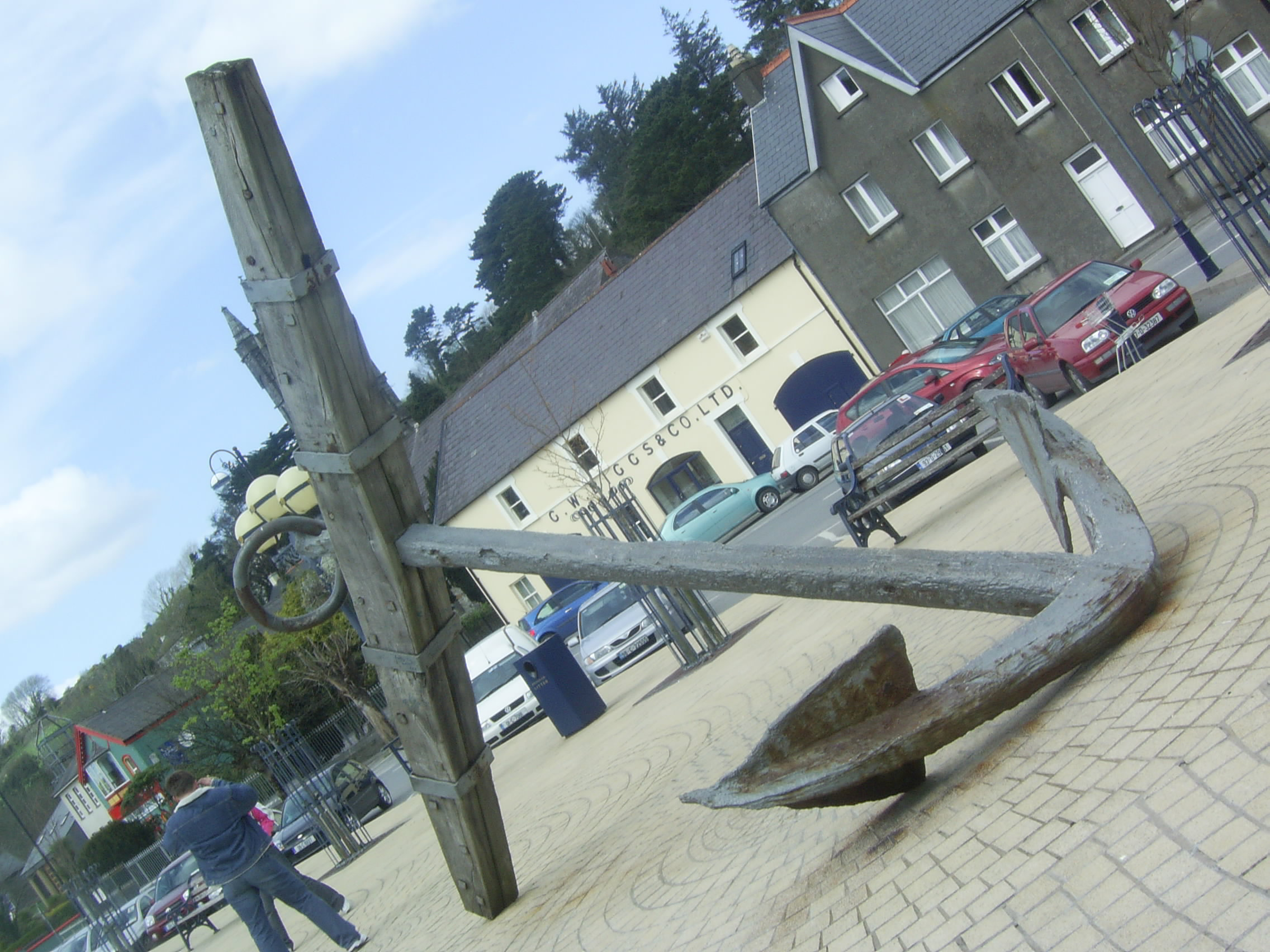
Anchor from the French invasion fleet discovered in 1981

For four more days Bouvet's ships were battered by the high winds, none able to approach the shore without severe risk of being destroyed on the rocky coast. Losing their anchors as the cables snapped, many ships were forced to run before the wind and scatter into the Western Approaches. Others were destroyed: an American ship named Ellis, passing close to Crookhaven on 29 December, encountered a vessel wallowing in the waves, dismasted and with the deck strewn with bodies. The American captain, Harvey, reported that he approached the ship but was unable to assist her due to the storm and as he watched, the ship was driven ashore and destroyed. This was the 44-gun frigate Impatiente, of which only seven men survived from her complement of 550 crew and passengers. Harvey also recounted coming across the Révolution and frigate Scévola. Captain Pierre Dumanoir le Pelley was in the process of removing the crew and passengers from Scévola before she foundered, the heavy weather having reduced the 40-gun razee frigate to a sinking condition. Ellis was not the only ship to discover Révolution; the long-delayed Fraternité encountered the ships and observed the destruction of the Scévola, which was burnt once she had been abandoned.

Bouvet had been driven offshore in his flagship Immortalité during the storm, and when the wind fell during 29 December he decided to abandon the operation. Signalling to the ships within view, he ordered his remaining squadron to sail southeast towards Brest. Some ships failed to receive the message and continued to the second rendezvous off the River Shannon, but they were few and scattered and in the continuing storms no landing was possible. With provisions running low, these ships also turned and sailed for Brest, as the weather worsened once more. As their expeditionary force sailed home, Morard de Galles and Hoche arrived in Bantry Bay on 30 December, discovering that the fleet had gone. With their own provisions almost exhausted, Fraternité and Révolution were forced to return to France as well. The British response to the attempted invasion continued to be inadequate, Colpoys arriving at Spithead on 31 December with only six of his ships still in formation. Only a handful of ships based at Cork under Rear-Admiral Robert Kingsmill, principally HMS Polyphemus under Captain George Lumsdaine and a frigate squadron, interfered with the French fleet: Polyphemus seized the transport Justine on 30 December and HMS Jason captured the transport Suffren shortly afterwards, although she was later recaptured by the French frigate Tartu.

== Retreat ==
The first French ships to return to Brest arrived on 1 January, including Bouvet's flagship Immortalité accompanied by Indomptable, Redoutable, Patriote, Mucius, Fougueux and some smaller ships. They had avoided any contact with British warships and had been able to make good speed in a period of relatively calm weather. During the following days, the French ships that had gathered off the Shannon limped home, all badly damaged due to the increasingly rough seas and high winds. Several ships did not return to France at all, including the frigate Surveillante, which was scuttled in Bantry Bay on 2 January; many of those aboard, including General Julien Mermet and 600 cavalrymen, were rescued by boats from the remaining French fleet while others scrambled ashore to become prisoners of war. On 5 January, Polyphemus outran and captured the frigate Tartu, of 44 guns and 625 men (including troops), after four hours of intermittent combat. The Royal Navy later took her into service as HMS Uranie. Polyphemus also captured another transport, but the weather being bad and night falling, she did not take possession. Captain Lumsdaine of Polyphemus reported that the transport was leaky and making distress signals, but that he was unable to assist. He thought it highly likely that she had sunk. This may have been the transport Fille-Unique, which sank in the Bay of Biscay on 6 January, although the fate of the 300 soldiers aboard is unknown.

On 7 January, the British frigates HMS Unicorn under Captain Sir Thomas Williams, HMS Doris under Captain Charles Jones and HMS Druid under Captain Richard King, captured the transport Ville de Lorient, Druid escorting the prize back to Cork. The following day Unicorn and Doris encountered some of the force that had attempted to land at the Shannon. Outnumbered, the frigates retreated westwards and encountered the battered Révolution and Fraternité, which withdrew before them. This prevented Morard de Galles and Hoche from belatedly joining their squadron and took them away from the route back to France. When Unicorn and Doris reappeared the following morning, they were operating as scouts for Bridport's fleet, which had finally left port at the start of the new year and had encountered the frigates during the night. Escaping pursuit in a fog, Révolution and Fraternité sailed directly for France and arrived at Rochefort on 13 January.

The majority of the remaining French ships had reached Brest on 11 January, including Constitution, Trajan, Pluton, Wattignies and Pégase, the latter towing the dismasted Résolue. On 13 January most of the remainder returned, including Nestor, Tourville, Éole and Cassard with their attendant frigates, while the frigate Bravoure arrived at Lorient alone. Losses had continued as the French neared Brest, the disarmed Suffren recaptured by HMS Daedalus off Ushant and burnt on 8 January, while Atalante was outrun and captured by HMS Phoebe on 10 January. On 12 January, the storeship Allègre was captured by the brig HMS Spitfire.

=== Droits de l'Homme ===
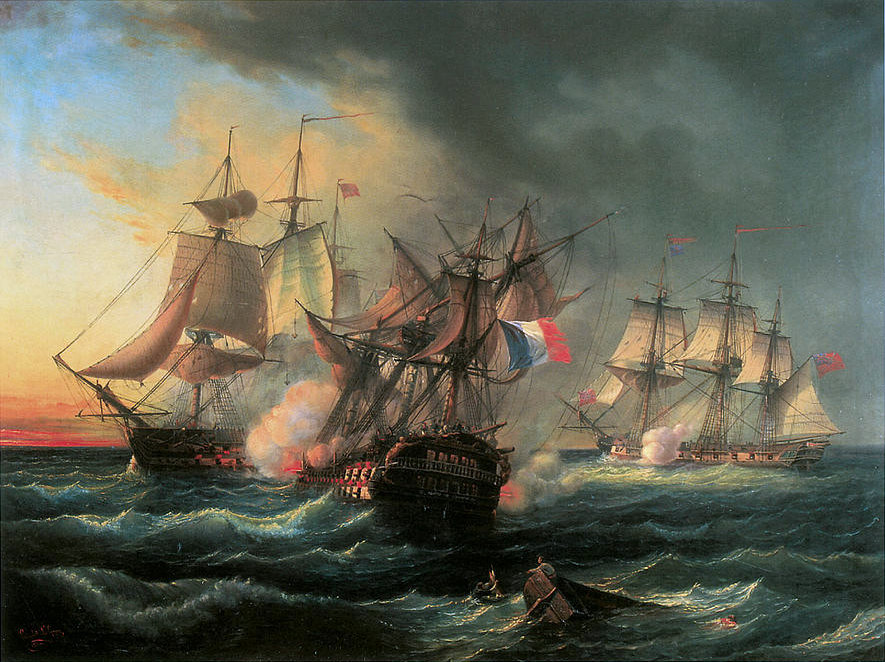
1853 painting of the action of 13 January 1797

By 13 January, all of the French fleet had been accounted for except the small brig Mutine, which was blown all the way to Santa Cruz and was captured there in July, and the 74-gun Droits de l'Homme. Droits de l'Homme had been among the ships under Bouvet in Bantry Bay and then with those that carried on to the Shannon, but as the fleet broke up she became separated. With provisions running low and landings still impossible, Captain Jean-Baptiste Raymond de Lacrosse determined to return to France independently. Progress was slow as Droits de l'Homme was overloaded with 1,300 men, including 800 soldiers under General Jean Humbert. She was further delayed when she encountered and captured a small British privateer named Cumberland. As a result, La Crosse had only reached Ushant by 13 January, where he encountered the same fog that had enabled Révolution and Fraternité to reach safety.

At 13:00, two ships emerged from the gloom to the east and Lacrosse turned away rather than risk his passengers in a pointless engagement. The ships persisted and were soon revealed to be the frigates Indefatigable under Captain Sir Edward Pellew, and Amazon under Captain Robert Carthew Reynolds, which had taken on supplies at Falmouth and then returned to their station off Brest. As Droits de l'Homme steered southwest, the winds increased once more and the sea became choppy, preventing Lacrosse from opening the gunports on his lower deck without severe risk of flooding and snapping his topmasts, which reduced his ship's stability. Realising his opponent's difficulties, Pellew closed with the larger ship and began a heavy fire. At 18:45, Amazon came within range and the frigates combined to repeatedly rake the French ship. The combat continued throughout the night, punctuated by short breaks in which the more mobile British ships repaired their battle damage out of range of Lacrosse's guns.

At 04:20 on 14 January, lookouts on all three ships sighted waves breaking immediately eastwards. Desperate to escape the heavy surf, Indefatigable turned north and Amazon turned south, while the battered Droits de l'Homme was unable to make any manoeuvre and drove straight onto a sandbar near the town of Plozévet, the force of the waves rolling her onto her side. Amazon too was wrecked, although in a more sheltered position which enabled the frigate to remain upright. The only surviving ship was Indefatigable, which was able to round the Penmarck rocks and reach open water. While Reynolds fashioned rafts to bring his men safely to shore, the French officers on Droits de l'Homme were unable to launch their boats, their exposed position in the heavy surf destroying every attempt to reach shore and drowning hundreds of men. Losses on board the wreck mounted as the storm continued, breaking open the stern of the ship and flooding the interior. On the morning of 15 January a group of prisoners from Cumberland reached the shore in a small boat, but subsequent attempts failed and it was not until 17 January that the sea calmed enough for the small naval vessel Arrogante to approach the wreck and remove the remaining 290 survivors.

== Aftermath ==
The French attempt to invade Ireland had ended in total failure. With the exception of a handful of prisoners of war, not one French soldier had successfully landed in Ireland, despite some ships remaining off the coast for almost two weeks. Twelve ships had been lost and over two thousand soldiers and sailors drowned. The invasion was abandoned, Hoche and his remaining men were returned to the army for service in Germany, and the general died nine months later from natural causes. The French Navy, although criticised for failing to land the expeditionary force, was also praised for successfully reaching Ireland and returning without encountering the main body of the British fleet. This achievement encouraged further invasion attempts, including a landing at Fishguard in Wales in February 1797 (Battle of Fishguard) and a second invasion of Ireland in mid-1798.

In Britain, the Royal Navy's response to the French campaign was heavily criticised; both fleets assigned to intercept the invasion fleet had failed, the only losses inflicted on the French coming from the small Cork squadron or Pellew's independent frigates. White was rewarded for his service on shore with the title Baron Bantry. At sea, Colpoys was replaced in command of the blockade of Brest by Rear-Admiral Sir Roger Curtis, and extensive deployments to the Bay of Biscay were made in February and March to prevent any further French operations. Reinforcements were also sent to the fleet off Cádiz under Vice-Admiral Sir John Jervis, who had won the Battle of Cape St Vincent on 14 February. These extended deployments were unpopular with the regular seamen and in April the Spithead Mutiny broke out, paralysing the Channel Fleet. The French, still recovering from their losses in the winter campaign, were unable to respond.

In Ireland, the failure of the French expeditionary force was the source of great frustration: Wolfe Tone, who was aboard Indomptable throughout the voyage, reported that he felt that he could have touched either side of the bay with both hands. Postponing the uprising, Tone continued to rally support in Europe, raising a fleet in the Netherlands for an attempted invasion that ended in destruction at the Battle of Camperdown. In May 1798, a British crackdown arrested the leaders of the United Irishmen in Ireland and provoked the Irish Rebellion. By the time the French had managed to gather a small force and reach Ireland in August, the rebellion was almost over and the inadequate French army, led by Jean Humbert, surrendered in September at the Battle of Ballinamuck. A subsequent invasion attempt the following month also ended in failure, when the invasion squadron was intercepted and defeated at the Battle of Tory Island. Wolfe Tone was captured at the action off Tory Island and committed suicide in prison. His death, combined with military defeat and reprisals against the Irish rebels, ended both the Society of United Irishmen and French invasion plans.

== See also ==
- Napoleon's planned invasion of the United Kingdom
- Spanish Armada
- Fourth Spanish Armada

== Notes ==
1. Sources vary on the exact number of French troops that eventually participated in the campaign. Pakenham gives 12,000, Clowes, James, Woodman and Henderson suggest 18,000 (although James quotes estimates between 16,200 and 25,000), while Regan and Come indicate approximately 20,000, although Come comments that they were of low quality.

== Bibliography ==
- Breen, Colin; Forsythe, Wes (2007). "The French Shipwreck La Surveillante, Lost in Bantry Bay, Ireland, in 1797". Historical Archaeology. 41 (3). Society for Historical Archaeology: 41–42. doi:10.1007/BF03377053. JSTOR 25617454. S2CID 162814509.
- Brooks, Richard (2005). Cassell's Battlefields of Britain & Ireland. London: Weidenfeld & Nicolson. ISBN 978-0-304-36333-9. OCLC 60793995.
- Chandler, David (1999) [1993]. Dictionary of the Napoleonic Wars. Wordsworth Military Library. ISBN 1-84022-203-4. OCLC 43582494.
- Clowes, William Laird (1997) [1900]. The Royal Navy, A History from the Earliest Times to 1900, Volume IV. London: Chatham Publishing. ISBN 1-86176-013-2. OCLC 59659759.
- Come, Donald R. (Winter 1952). "French Threat to British Shores, 1793–1798". Military Affairs. 16 (4): 174–88. doi:10.2307/1982368. ISSN 3703-2240. JSTOR 1982368.
- Gardiner, Robert, ed. (2001) [1996]. Fleet Battle and Blockade. Caxton Editions. ISBN 1-84067-363-X. OCLC 50264868.
- Grocott, Terence (2002) [1997]. Shipwrecks of the Revolutionary & Napoleonic Era. Caxton Editions. ISBN 1-84067-164-5. OCLC 50101032.
- Henderson CBE, James (1994) [1970]. The Frigates: An Account of the Lighter Warships of the Napoleonic Wars 1793–1815. Leo Cooper. ISBN 0-85052-432-6. OCLC 32584549.
- Ireland, Bernard (2000). Naval Warfare in the Age of Sail: War at Sea, 1756–1815. London: Harper Collins. ISBN 978-0-00-414522-8. OCLC 44652866.
- James, William (2002) [1827]. The Naval History of Great Britain, Volume 2, 1797–1799. London: Conway Maritime Press. ISBN 0-85177-906-9. OCLC 255340498.
- Lloyd, Christopher (1963). St Vincent & Camperdown. London: B. T. Batsford Ltd.
- Pakenham, Thomas (2000) [1997]. The Year of Liberty: The Story of the Great Irish Rebellion of 1798 (Rev. ed.). London: Abacus. ISBN 978-0-349-11252-7. OCLC 59362609.
- Regan, Geoffrey (2001). Geoffrey Regan's Book of Naval Blunders. Andre Deutsch. ISBN 0-233-99978-7. OCLC 49892294.
- Smith, Digby (1998). The Greenhill Napoleonic Wars Data Book. London: Greenhill. ISBN 978-1-85367-276-7. OCLC 37616149.
- Tracy, Nicholas, ed. (1998). "Narrative of the dreadful Shipwreck of Les Droits de L'Homme, a French ship, of 74 guns, driven on shore on the 14th February 1797, after a severe Action with the Indefatigable and Amazon Frigates, under the Command of Sir Edward Pellew and Captain Reynolds. By Elias Pipon, Lieutenant. 63rd Regiment.". The Naval Chronicle, Volume 1, 1793–1798. Chatham Publishing. ISBN 1-86176-091-4. OCLC 248862507.
- Woodman, Richard (2001). The Sea Warriors: Fighting Captains and Frigate Warfare in the Age of Nelson. London: Constable Publishers. ISBN 1-84119-183-3. OCLC 59550064.

Preceded by Battle of Arcole	French Revolution: Revolutionary campaigns French expedition to Ireland (1796)	Succeeded by Action of 13 January 1797
