= French ship Sceptre (1780) =

Ship of the line of the French Navy

History

France
- Name: Sceptre
- Namesake: Sceptre; National Convention; Battle of Marengo
- Builder: Brest
- Laid down: 25 May 1780
- Launched: 21 September 1780
- Commissioned: October 1780
- Decommissioned: 1802
- Renamed: Convention, 29 September 1792; Marengo, August 1800
- Fate: Hulked, 1802.; Broken up, 1811.

General characteristics
- Type: Vaisseau de 2e rang; ("Ship of the 2nd Rate")
- Displacement: 2,996 tonneaux
- Tons burthen: 1,585 port tonneaux
- Length: 55.55 metres (182.3 ft) (171 pied)
- Beam: 14.3 metres (47 ft) (44 pied)
- Depth: 7 metres (23 ft) (21.6 pied)
- Propulsion: Sail
- Complement: 750 men
- Armament: 74 guns: 28 × 36-pounder long guns; 30 × 18-pounder long guns; 16 × 8-pounder long guns
- Armour: Timber

Sceptre was a 74-gun ship of the line of the French Navy. Built under the Ancien Régime, she took part in the naval operations in the American Revolutionary War. At the Revolution, she took part in the main actions of the French Revolutionary Wars, notably the so-called Glorious First of June and in Bruix' expedition of 1799. Showing her age by the rise of the First French Empire, she was hulked and eventually broken up.

== Career ==
In 1781 and 1782, she took part in the naval operations in the American Revolutionary War, under Admiral de Grasse. She fought at the Battle of the Chesapeake and faced HMS Formidable on 12 April 1782 at the Battle of the Saintes under Louis de Rigaud de Vaudreuil.

In August, Sceptre, Astrée and Engageante, under La Pérouse, raided several English fur trading posts during the Hudson Bay Expedition, including Fort Prince of Wales. In 1783, she was decommissioned in Brest.

On 29 September 1792, she was renamed Convention. She took part in the battle of the Glorious First of June in 1794, engaging HMS Caesar and Bellerophon. She later took part in the Croisière du Grand Hiver winter campaign of 1794–1795, the Expédition d'Irlande of December 1796, and the Bruix' expedition of 1799.

On 18 February 1800, Captain Louis-Marie Le Gouardun took command, until 11 March of the same year. In August, she was renamed Marengo, and was condemned in 1802. She was used as a prison hulk in Brest before being broken up in 1811.
