= French ship Téméraire (1782) =

Ship of the line of the French Navy

- Scale model of Achille, sister ship of French ship Téméraire (1782), on display at the Musée national de la Marine in Paris.

History

France
- Name: Téméraire
- Namesake: "Temerarious"
- Builder: Brest
- Laid down: May 1782
- Launched: 17 December 1782
- Commissioned: July 1783
- Stricken: 9 November 1802
- Fate: Broken up, 1803

General characteristics
- Class & type: Téméraire-class ship of the line
- Displacement: 3,069 tonneaux
- Tons burthen: 1,537 port tonneaux
- Length: 55.87 m (183 ft 4 in)
- Beam: 14.46 m (47 ft 5 in)
- Draught: 7.15 m (23.5 ft)
- Depth of hold: 7.15 m (23 ft 5 in)
- Sail plan: Full-rigged ship
- Crew: 705
- Armament: 74 guns: Lower gun deck: 28 × 36-pounder long guns; Upper gun deck: 30 × 18-pounder long guns; Forecastle and Quarterdeck: 12 × 8-pounder long guns, 10 × 36-pounder carronades

Téméraire was the lead ship of her class of 74-gun ships of the line built for the French Navy during the 1780s. Completed in 1783, the ship was heavily involved in the Napoleonic Wars. She was condemned in 1802 and scrapped the following year.

== Description ==
The Téméraire-class ships had a length of 55.87 metres (183 ft 4 in), a beam of 14.46 metres (47 ft 5 in) and a depth of hold of 7.15 metres (23 ft 5 in). The ships displaced 3,069 tonneaux and had a mean draught of 7.15 metres (23 ft 5 in). They had a tonnage of 1,537 port tonneaux. Their crew numbered 705 officers and ratings during wartime. They were fitted with three masts and ship rigged.

The muzzle-loading, smoothbore armament of the Téméraire class consisted of twenty-eight 36-pounder long guns on the lower gun deck, thirty 18-pounder long guns and thirty 18-pounder long guns on the upper gun deck. On the quarterdeck and forecastle were a total of a dozen 8-pounder long guns and ten 36-pounder carronades.

== Construction and career ==
Téméraire was ordered in 1782 and was laid down at the Arsenal de Brest in May. The ship was named on 1 June and launched on 17 December. She was completed in July 1783.

In 1782 or 1783, Téméraire was under Sainte-Eulalie. She took part in the Glorious First of June on 1 June 1794, fighting HMS Russell. The ship took part in the Croisière du Grand Hiver of late 1794, but had to return to Saint Malo after a leak opened in her hull in the night of 30/31 December. From April 1798, Téméraire was in a state of disrepair and needed to be refitted or demolished. She was eventually condemned on 9 November 1802 and broken up the following year.
