= French ship Tourville (1788) =

Ship of the line of the French Navy

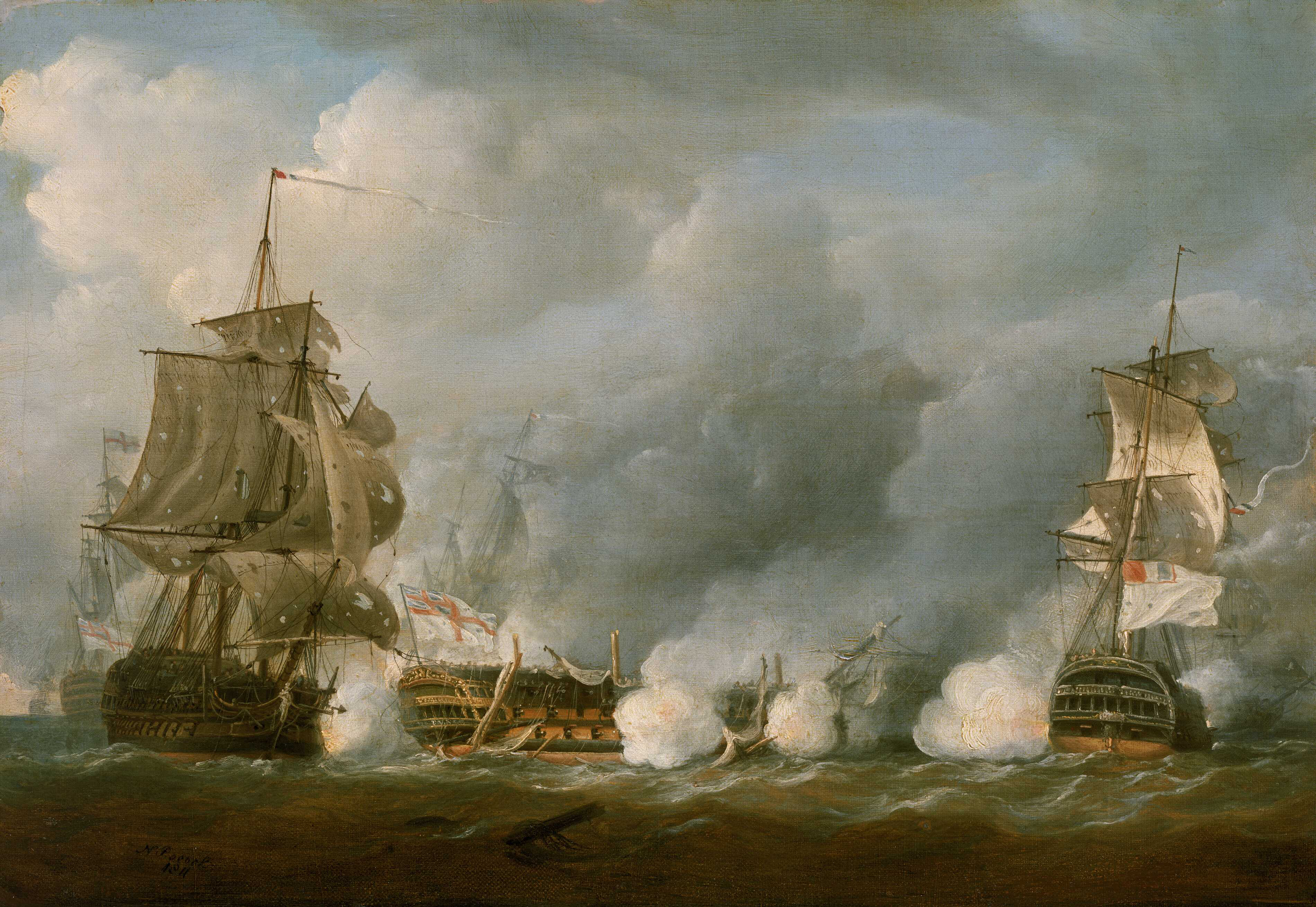
- Tourville (left) at the Glorious First of June

History

France
- Name: Tourville
- Namesake: Anne Hilarion de Tourville
- Builder: Lorient
- Laid down: 1 June 1787
- Launched: 16 September 1788
- Commissioned: July 1790
- Decommissioned: 26 October 1833
- Fate: Broken up in Brest in 1841

General characteristics
- Class & type: Téméraire-class ship of the line
- Displacement: 3,069 tonneaux
- Tons burthen: 1,537 port tonneaux
- Length: 55.87 m (183 ft 4 in)
- Beam: 14.46 m (47 ft 5 in)
- Draught: 7.15 m (23.5 ft)
- Depth of hold: 7.15 m (23 ft 5 in)
- Sail plan: Full-rigged ship
- Crew: 705
- Armament: 74 guns: Lower gun deck: 28 × 36 pdr guns; Upper gun deck: 30 × 18 pdr guns; Forecastle and Quarterdeck: 16 × 8 pdr guns

Tourville was a 74-gun Téméraire-class ship of the line built for the French Navy during the 1780s. Completed in 1790, she played a minor role in the French Revolutionary Wars.

== Description ==
The Téméraire-class ships had a length of 55.87 metres (183 ft 4 in), a beam of 14.46 metres (47 ft 5 in) and a depth of hold of 7.15 metres (23 ft 5 in). The ships displaced 3,069 tonneaux and had a mean draught of 7.15 metres (23 ft 5 in). They had a tonnage of 1,537 port tonneaux. Their crew numbered 705 officers and ratings during wartime. They were fitted with three masts and ship rigged.

The muzzle-loading, smoothbore armament of the Téméraire class consisted of twenty-eight 36-pounder long guns on the lower gun deck, thirty 18-pounder long guns and thirty 18-pounder long guns on the upper gun deck. On the quarterdeck and forecastle were a total of sixteen 8-pounder long guns. Beginning with the ships completed after 1787, the armament of the Téméraires began to change with the addition of four 36-pounder obusiers on the poop deck (dunette). Some ships had instead twenty 8-pounders.

== Construction and career ==
Tourville was laid down at the Arsenal de Lorient on 1 June 1787 and named on 25 August. The ship was launched 16 September 1788 and completed in July 1790. In 1790, she was under the command of Armand de Saint-Félix.

After having broken out of Brest during a storm in March 1793, she was damaged by a tempest, which also killed her captain, and had to return to Brest in August. In September, a mutiny broke out aboard. She took part in the Glorious First of June in 1794, to the French expedition to Ireland two years, and to the Cruise of Bruix in 1799. She was eventually broken up in Brest in 1841.

== Bibliography ==
- Roche, Jean-Michel (2005). Dictionnaire des bâtiments de la flotte de guerre française de Colbert à nos jours [Dictionary of French Warships from Colbert to Today]. Vol. 1: 1671-1870. Roche. ISBN 978-2-9525917-0-6. OCLC 165892922.
- Levot, Prosper (1866). Les gloires maritimes de la France: notices biographiques sur les plus célèbres marins (in French). Bertrand.
- Winfield, Rif and Roberts, Stephen S. (2015) French Warships in the Age of Sail 1786-1861: Design, Construction, Careers and Fates. Seaforth Publishing. ISBN 978-1-84832-204-2
