= Louis Thomas Villaret de Joyeuse =

French Navy officer and politician (1747–1812)

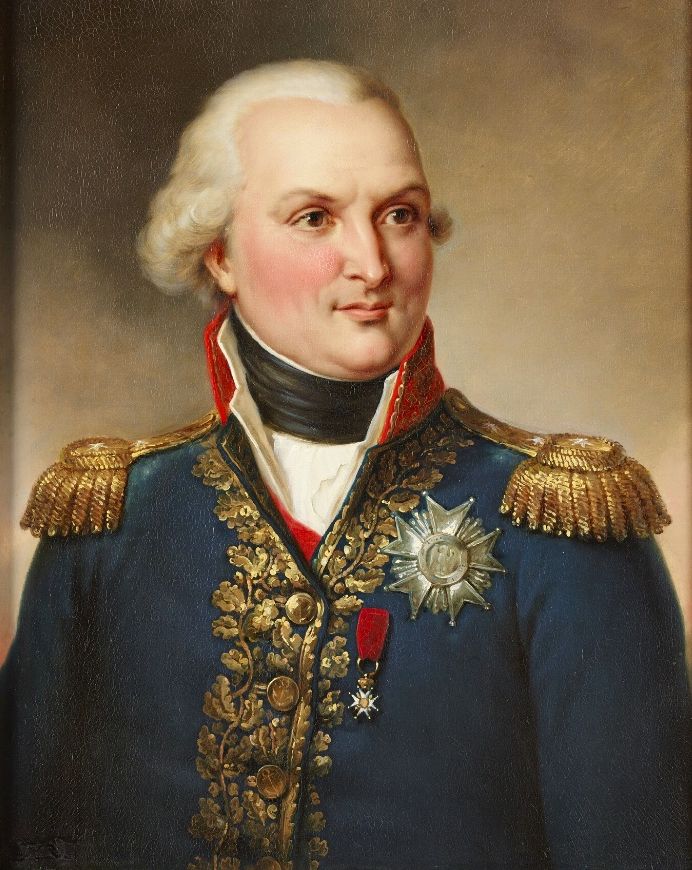
- Portrait by Jean-Baptiste Paulin Guérin, 1839
- Born: 29 May 1747; Auch, Gascony
- Died: 24 July 1812 (aged 65); Venice, Italy
- Spouse: Thérèse Félicité de Villars de Roche
- Military career
- Allegiance: Kingdom of France; French First Republic; First French Empire
- Branch: French Navy; French Imperial Navy
- Service years: 1778–1812
- Rank: Vice admiral
- Conflicts: American Revolutionary War; Siege of Pondicherry (1778); Battle of Cuddalore (1783); French Revolutionary Wars; War of the First Coalition; Glorious First of June; Croisière du Grand Hiver; Battle of Groix; Napoleonic Wars; Saint-Domingue expedition; Invasion of Martinique (1809) (surrendered)
- Awards: Order of Saint Louis; Legion of Honor

Vice-Admiral Louis Thomas Villaret de Joyeuse (French: [lwi tɔma vilaʁɛ də ʒwajøz]; 29 May 1747 (Note: Some biographers give a date of 1750 (Levot, p.541). Granier quotes the registers of Sainte-Marie parish.) – 24 July 1812) was a French Navy officer and politician who served in the American Revolutionary War and French Revolutionary and Napoleonic Wars. Born in Auch, Gascony, after serving in the Indian Ocean under Suffren during the Revolutionary War he rose in rank during the early stages of the French Revolution. Villaret commanded the French navy at the Glorious First of June, where despite suffering a heavy tactical defeat at British hands he ensured the passage of a vital grain convoy to France.

Villaret led the French navy during the disastrous Croisière du Grand Hiver and failed to prevent a British fleet from successfully retreating, with his last battle being a defeat off Groix. He was relieved when he refused to serve for the disastrous French expedition to Ireland. Villaret was then elected at the Council of Five Hundred. He joined the Club de Clichy, a party which supported French colonialism and slavery and harboured Royalist sympathies. After the Coup of 18 Fructidor, Villaret was sentenced to be deported to Cayenne but went into hiding long enough for his sentence to be commuted to exile to Oléron, where he went willingly.

Reinstated in 1801, Villaret took command of the naval component of the Saint-Domingue expedition, and was appointed captain general of Martinique and Saint Lucia alongside the colonial prefect Charles-Henri Bertin. He served in this capacity until the British captured Martinique in 1809. Returned to France, Villaret fell in disfavour for his perceived weak defence during the invasion. After two years, Napoleon pardoned him and appointed him as governor of Venice. Villaret died there of edema in 1812.

== Early life ==
Louis-Thomas Villaret was born in Auch, Gascony on 29 May 1747, the son of a fiscal officer. (Note: "contrôleur du domaine royal", "controller of Royal domains" (Granier, p.87)) Unable to enter the elite naval schools, he entered the French Navy as a volontaire in 1768. Promoted to frigate lieutenant in 1773, he served as a lieutenant on the 32-gun frigate Atalante in the Indian Ocean. In 1778, unemployed in Pondicherry, he volunteered his services to Governor Guillaume de Bellecombe during the unsuccessful defence of Pondicherry against the British, earning the rank of fireship captain.

== Service under Suffren ==
In 1781, Villaret commanded the fireship Pulvérisateur in Vice-admiral Pierre André de Suffren's fleet. He then served under Suffren, who made him his aide in 1782. He was later transferred to the frigate Dauphine, and became First Officer on Brillant in Suffren's squadron. After the Battle of Cuddalore on 20 June 1783, Suffren gave him command of the frigate Bellone.

A few months after, Suffren appointed Villaret to the 20-gun the corvette Naïade. He ordered him to sail to Madras and warn the French blockading squadron, composed of two ships of the line and two frigates, of the imminent arrival of a superior British force. Three days after her departure, on 11 April 1783, Naïade spotted the 64-gun HMS Sceptre, under Captain Samuel Graves; after trying without success to elude his much stronger opponent, Villaret was forced into battle, and struck his colours after a five-hour fight. When Villaret surrendered his sword, Graves allegedly told him "Sir, you have given us a fairly beautiful frigate, but you made us pay dearly for her!"; some authors add that Graves returned Villaret his sword.

Villaret was taken prisoner. Despite the loss of Naïade, the British squadron was unable to locate the French ships, which had already departed. Naïade was not commissioned in the Royal Navy and was sold. Villaret was released in June 1783, after the Treaty of Versailles, and was awarded the Order of Saint Louis. Villaret was promoted to Lieutenant in 1784 for his service. After the war, Villaret served in the harbour of Lorient.

== French Revolution ==
In 1791, Villaret was appointed to command the frigate Prudente to transport troops to Saint-Domingue. Arriving shortly before the 1791 slave rebellion that launched the Haitian Revolution, he helped Governor Philibert François Rouxel de Blanchelande transport troops around the island. On 14 March 1792, he swore the "civic oath" to signify his support of the French Revolution, while his brother emigrated from France. Promoted to ship-of-the-line captain in 1792, he was given the command of the 74-gun Trajan in 1793; in May 1793, part of a squadron under Morard de Galle, he was tasked with watching the coasts of Morbihan and Loire, to prevent the British from aiding the War in the Vendée.

When the rest of the Brest fleet sailed to Belle Île and the Quibéron mutinies broke out among many ships in the fleet, Villaret was one of the few officers who maintained order aboard his ship. In 1794, Villaret was promoted to counter admiral, and Jeanbon Saint André appointed him to command the 25-ship Brest fleet. Hoisting his flag on the 120-gun Montagne, Villaret reorganised and revitalised the Brest fleet. Among other measures, Saint André and Villaret-Joyeuse founded a naval artillery school.

=== Atlantic campaign of May 1794 ===
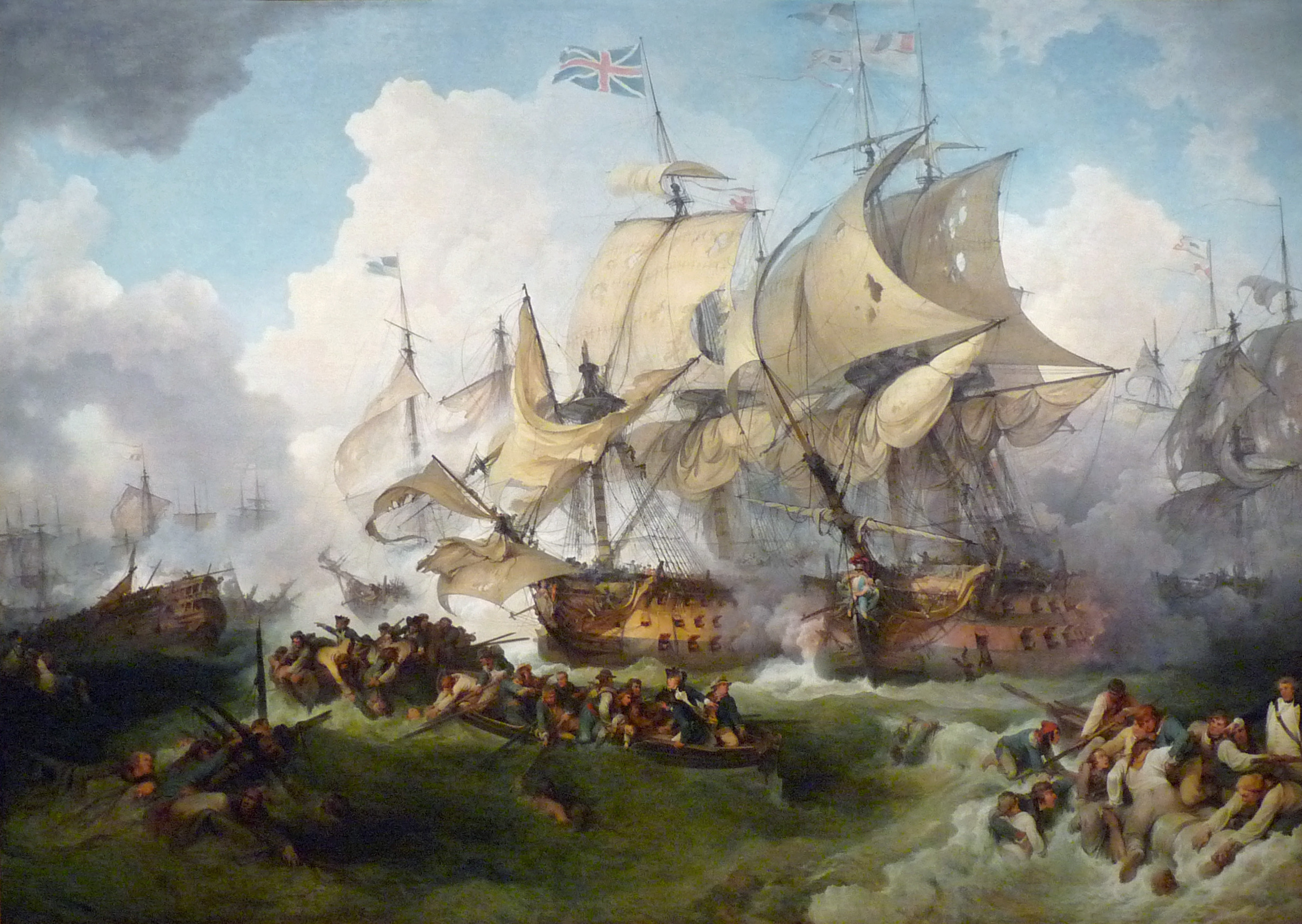
The Glorious First of June, where Villaret won a strategic victory but suffered a tactical defeat

In the summer of 1794, Villaret sailed with 23 ships of the line and 16 frigates to protect a 170-ship grain convoy under Counter-admiral Pierre Jean Van Stabel, coming from the United States. The convoy was necessary to relieve France from famine after a disastrous harvest, and the British Channel Squadron under Admiral Lord Howe had set out to prevent it from reaching France; the orders of the National Convention to the fleet were to stall the British navy and prevent them from intercepting the convoy at all costs.

The Brest fleet departed and sailed to the Azores to wait for the arrival of Van Stabel's convoy. On 28 May, the French and British fleets came in contact 100 leagues off Ushant, and began seeking each other in the fog; the engagement culminated in the Glorious First of June. Although suffering severe losses, Villaret rallied his remaining ships and rescued several from being captured; most importantly, the grain convoy reached Brest unmolested. Supported by Saint-André, Villaret kept his command despite the heavy French tactical defeat. He blamed his losses on the conduct of several of his captains who had allegedly failed to fulfil their duties. On 27 September 1794, Villaret was promoted to vice admiral.

== Subsequent campaigns and dismissal ==
In December, the Committee of Public Safety ordered him to attack British commerce in the Croisière du Grand Hiver. Although the cruise did lead to the capture of a number of British merchant ships, the French fleet was battered by storms in which several ships were sunk and all the surviving ships suffered heavy damage. In June 1795, he sailed with nine ships to relieve a small squadron near Belle Île. During Cornwallis's Retreat, Villaret-Joyeuse tried to engage the small British squadron blockading Belle Île. Unable to bring them to battle, Villaret attempted to return to Brest, but contrary winds forced him towards Lorient. Close to Lorient, Villaret-Joyeuse was discovered by British Admiral Alexander Hood's fleet, guarding the expedition to Quiberon. During the ensuing Battle of Groix, several of Villaret's ships disobeyed his orders and sailed away, with three ships of the line being captured by the British. In 1796, Villaret was appointed to command the fleet for the French expedition to Ireland, an attempt to land General Lazare Hoche's army in Ireland; opposed to the project, Villaret was replaced with Justin Bonaventure Morard de Galles.

=== Political career ===
In 1796, Villaret was elected to the Council of Five Hundred as a representative of Morbihan. As a member of the Club de Clichy, then considered to constitute the council's Royalist party, he gave several speeches about French colonies, arguing against the abolition of slavery. He also lobbied in favour of strengthening the French Navy. After the Coup of 18 Fructidor, Villaret was sentenced to deportation to Cayenne; he went into hiding until the French Directory ordered those who had escaped deportation to Cayenne exiled to the Île d'Oléron; Villaret willingly surrendered himself. He remained on the Île d'Oléron until the Coup of 18 Brumaire.

== Revitalised career and death ==
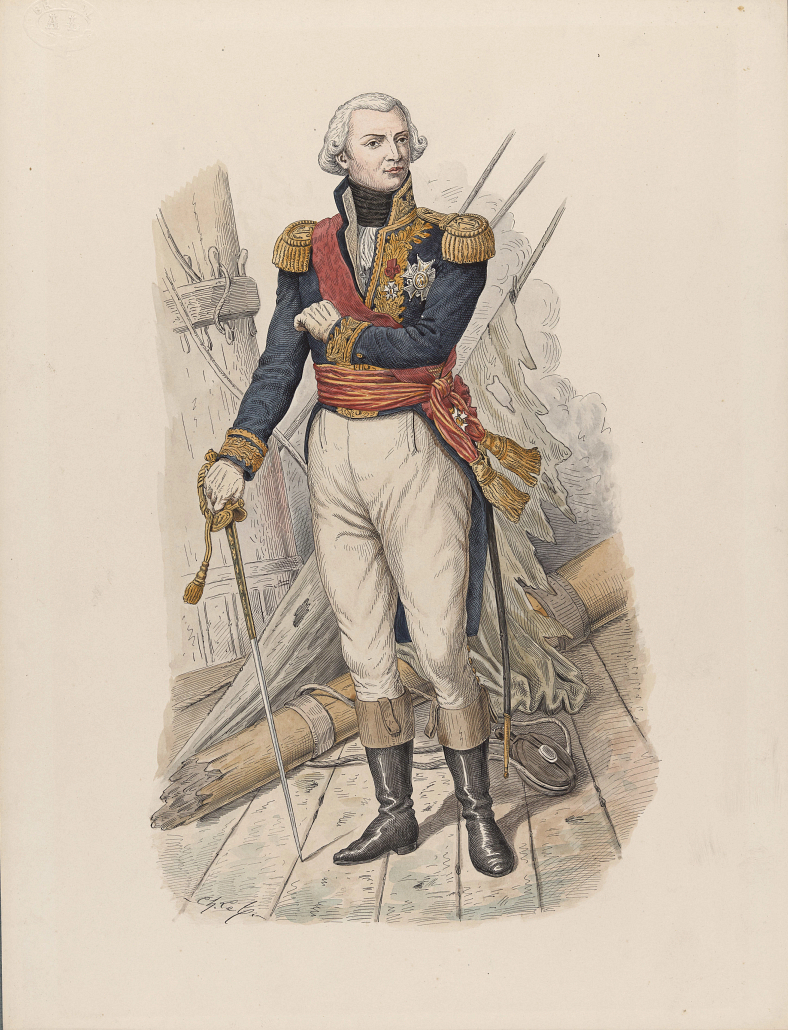
1850 portrait of Villaret

In 1801, First Consul Napoleon ended Villaret-Joyeuse's exile and returned him to active command. Initially, he wanted Villaret-Joyeuse to prepare an expedition to capture the British-occupied Dutch Cape Colony, then head into the Indian Ocean. With the Treaty of Amiens, Napoleon decided to attempt to regain control of Saint-Domingue from Toussaint Louverture with the Saint-Domingue expedition. In December 1801, Villaret set out with ten French and five Spanish ships and nine frigates and corvettes, with his flag on the 118-gun Océan, ferrying 7000 of General Charles Leclerc's expeditionary troops to Saint Domingue. Two further squadron, one from Lorient comprising one ship, two frigates and 1200 soldiers, and the other from Rochefort with six ships, six frigates, two corvettes and 3000 soldiers, joined his fleet off Brest. Conflicts over command led Villaret to return to France with the majority of the fleet.

In April 1802, Napoleon appointed Villaret captain general of Martinique and Saint Lucia. Taking control of Martinique in September in accordance with the Treaty of Amiens, he faced the threats of slave rebellions, yellow fever and the possibility of a British invasion. On 3 November 1802, Villaret founded a 94-strong gendarmerie force, and on 8 July 1803, a company of black chasseurs. He cooperated with Counter-admiral Édouard Thomas Burgues de Missiessy and Vice-admiral Pierre-Charles Villeneuve who sailed into the Caribbean in 1805 during the Trafalgar campaign.

In January 1809, a British expedition invaded Martinique and laid siege to the fortress at Fort-de-France. Once the British were able to bring up their heavy artillery, the month-long siege ended on 24 February with the surrender of Villaret. Upon his return to France, Villaret's conduct was condemned by an inquiry council; he requested in vain for a court-martial to clear his name, and lived in disgrace for two years. Napoleon granted him a pardon in 1811: "Bravery and fidelity plead in favour of the vice-admiral... did his faults lose the colony? At most, they shortened its keeping for a few days." As Napoleon prepared for the French invasion of Russia, he appointed Villaret governor-general of Venice in the Kingdom of Italy, and commander of the kingdom's 12th Division. Villaret retained this position until 24 July 1812, when he died of edema in Venice. To honour him, Napoleon had his name engraved on the Arc de Triomphe in Paris.

== Legacy ==
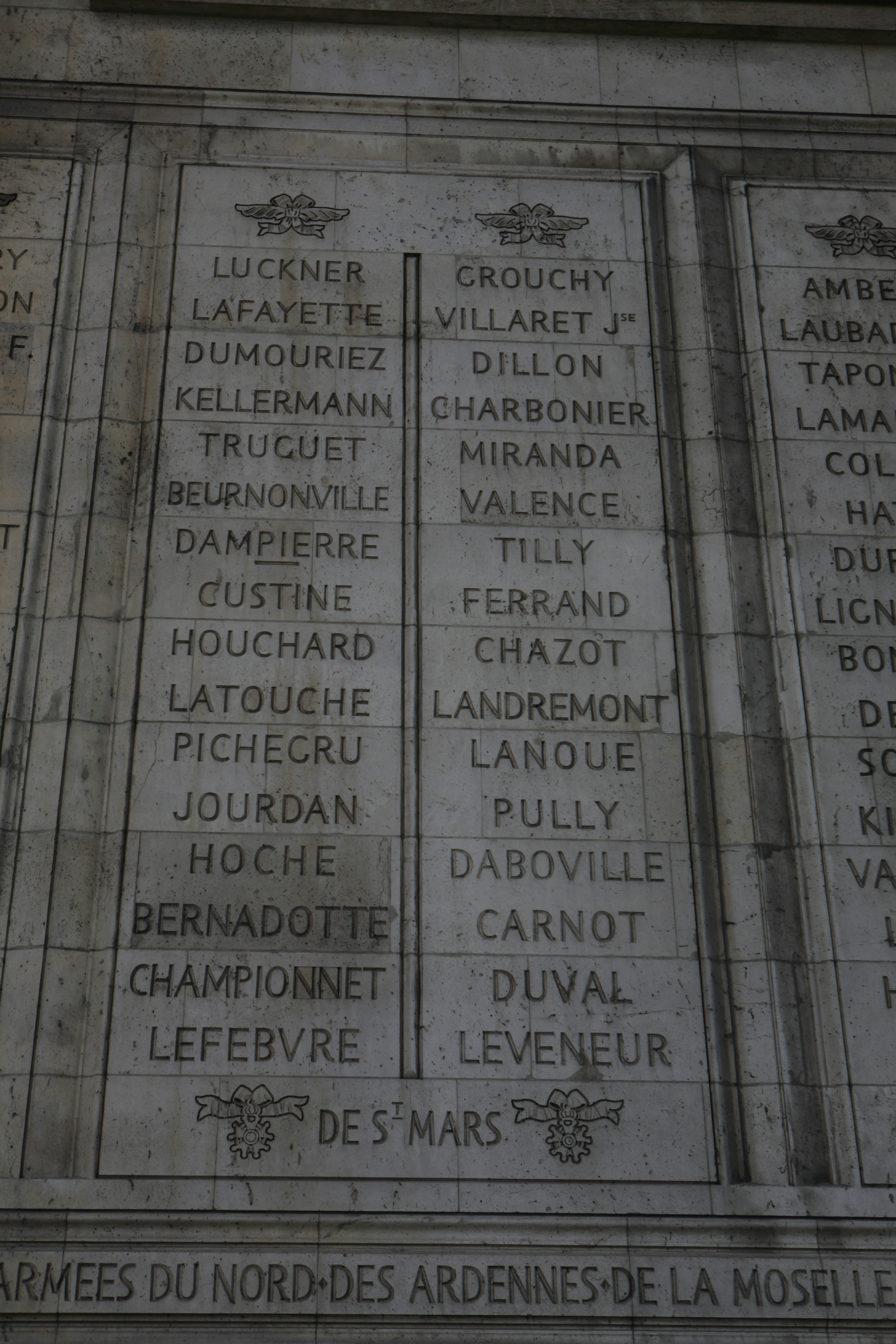
Villaret's name on the Arc de Triomphe

A number of legends have been reported as truths on Villaret-Joyeuse. He is often said to have come from a noble family; this appears to be false. Another legend holds that he enlisted in the Gendarmes before joining the Navy; however, Villaret is listed on none of the lists of Gendarmes in the relevant years. Some authors further state that Villaret had to leave the Gendarmes after killing an opponent in a duel, either at the age of 16 or at the age of 18.

== Honours ==
- Knight of the Order of Saint Louis – 15 July 1783
- Knight of the Legion of Honour – 11 October 1803
- Grand Officer of the Legion of Honour - 14 June 1804
- Grand Cordon of the Legion of Honour – 2 February 1805

== Notes and references ==
=== Bibliography ===
- Chisholm, Hugh, ed. (1911). "Villaret de Joyeuse, Louis Thomas" . Encyclopædia Britannica. Vol. 28 (11th ed.). Cambridge University Press. p. 76.
- Hennequin, Joseph François Gabriel (1835). Biographie maritime ou notices historiques sur la vie et les campagnes des marins célèbres français et étrangers (in French). Vol. 2. Paris: Regnault éditeur.
- Chartrand, Rene (1989). Napoleon's Overseas Army. Paris: Osprey Publishing. ISBN 9780850459005.
- Levot, Prosper (1866). Les gloires maritimes de la France: notices biographiques sur les plus célèbres marins (in French). Bertrand.
- Ortholan, Henri (2006). L'Amiral Villaret-Joyeuse : des Antilles à Venise 1747-1812 (in French). Bernard Giovanangeli. ISBN 978-2909034850.
