= French ship Trajan (1792) =

Ship of the line of the French Navy

- Scale model of Achille, sister ship of French ship Trajan (1792), on display at the Musée national de la Marine in Paris.

History

France
- Name: Trajan
- Namesake: Trajan
- Ordered: 19 October 1787
- Builder: Lorient
- Laid down: 17 May 1790
- Launched: 24 January 1792
- Commissioned: November 1792
- Decommissioned: June 1802
- Renamed: Gaulois 1797
- Fate: Broken up, 1805

General characteristics
- Class & type: Téméraire-class ship of the line
- Displacement: 3,069 tonneaux
- Tons burthen: 1,537 port tonneaux
- Length: 55.87 m (183 ft 4 in)
- Beam: 14.46 m (47 ft 5 in)
- Draught: 7.15 m (23.5 ft)
- Depth of hold: 7.15 m (23 ft 5 in)
- Sail plan: Full-rigged ship
- Crew: 705
- Armament: 74 guns: Lower gun deck: 28 × 36 pdr guns; Upper gun deck: 30 × 18 pdr guns; Forecastle and Quarterdeck: 16 × 8 pdr guns

Trajan was a 74-gun Téméraire-class ship of the line built for the French Navy during the 1780s. Completed in 1792, she played a minor role in the French Revolutionary Wars.

== Description ==
The Téméraire-class ships had a length of 55.87 metres (183 ft 4 in), a beam of 14.46 metres (47 ft 5 in) and a depth of hold of 7.15 metres (23 ft 5 in). The ships displaced 3,069 tonneaux and had a mean draught of 7.15 metres (23 ft 5 in). They had a tonnage of 1,537 port tonneaux. Their crew numbered 705 officers and ratings during wartime. They were fitted with three masts and ship rigged.

The muzzle-loading, smoothbore armament of the Téméraire class consisted of twenty-eight 36-pounder long guns on the lower gun deck, thirty 18-pounder long guns and thirty 18-pounder long guns on the upper gun deck. On the quarterdeck and forecastle were a total of sixteen 8-pounder long guns. Beginning with the ships completed after 1787, the armament of the Téméraires began to change with the addition of four 36-pounder obusiers on the poop deck (dunette). Some ships had instead twenty 8-pounders.

== Construction and career ==
Trajan was ordered on 17 October 1787 and laid down at the Arsenal de Lorient on 17 May 1790. The ship was launched on 24 January 1792 and completed in November. Trajan was commissioned in April 1793 by Captain Villaret de Joyeuse. At the Glorious First of June in 1794, along with Éole, she engaged and dismasted the British HMS Bellerophon. She took part in the French expedition to Ireland in 1798, an ill-fated attempt to invade Ireland. On 17 December 1797, the ship was renamed Gaulois. She was ordered to be broken up on 8 January 1805.

== Bibliography ==
- Roche, Jean-Michel (2005). Dictionnaire des bâtiments de la flotte de guerre française de Colbert à nos jours [Dictionary of French Warships from Colbert to Today]. Vol. 1: 1671-1870. Roche. ISBN 978-2-9525917-0-6. OCLC 165892922.
- Winfield, Rif and Roberts, Stephen S. (2015) French Warships in the Age of Sail 1786-1861: Design, Construction, Careers and Fates. Seaforth Publishing. ISBN 978-1-84832-204-2
