= Thomas Fortescue Kennedy =

Captain Thomas Fortescue Kennedy
- Born: 9 November 1774
- Died: 15 May 1846 (aged 71)
- Military career
- Allegiance: United Kingdom of Great Britain and Ireland
- Branch: Royal Navy
- Service years: 1789 – 1846
- Rank: Post-Captain
- Commands: HMS Cordelia; HMS Temeraire
- Conflicts: French Revolutionary Wars; Siege of Toulon; Napoleonic Wars; Battle of Trafalgar; Walcheren Campaign

Thomas Fortescue Kennedy (9 November 1774 – 15 May 1846) was an officer of the Royal Navy who served during the French Revolutionary and Napoleonic Wars.

Kennedy was born into a family with a history of military service, and entered the navy shortly before the outbreak of the French Revolutionary Wars. After some service on frigates during the various armament crises, in which Kennedy saw service on foreign stations, he was actively involved in the Siege of Toulon, and afterwards was promoted to lieutenant. He spent some time in the East Indies, distinguishing himself in action, before returning to British waters and serving under a number of prominent naval officers aboard ships of the line. One such officer was Eliab Harvey, who later asked for him to become first-lieutenant on his ship, the 98-gun HMS Temeraire.

Aboard Temeraire Kennedy fought at Trafalgar and played a key role in the capture of the French Fougueux. Promoted to commander for his services, Kennedy captained a ship during the Walcheren Campaign, before being promoted to post-captain shortly before the end of the Napoleonic Wars. His last posting was in 1834, as Captain-Superintendent at Sheerness Dockyard. For the last two years of his commission he commanded his old ship, HMS Temeraire, which was at Sheerness, serving as a guardship. He was required to arrange and oversee the sale and disposal of the Trafalgar veteran in 1838, one of his last duties before his own commission ended later that year. Kennedy subsequently went into retirement and died in 1846.

== Family and early life ==
Kennedy was born on 9 November 1774, the son of Dr Kennedy, the Inspector-General of Army Hospitals and physician to the Prince of Wales. One of several brothers, Thomas was not alone in choosing a military career. At least two brothers joined the army, one became a captain in the 19th Foot and died in Ceylon in 1801. Another, Sir Robert Hugh Kennedy, served as head of the Army Commissariat under the Duke of Wellington during the Peninsular War.

Thomas Kennedy differed from his brothers in embarking on a career in the navy, joining up on 12 August 1789 as a volunteer first class, under the patronage of Admiral Lord Hood. He was assigned to serve aboard the 74-gun HMS Colossus, which at the time was the guardship at Portsmouth, successively under the commands of Captains Hugh Cloberry Christian and Henry Harvey. He was then assigned to the 28-gun HMS Pomona, under Captain Henry Savage, and sailed with her to Africa and the West Indies. His service here lasted until September 1790, after which he served as a midshipman on the Home and Newfoundland stations. He was first aboard the 36-gun HMS Crescent, under Captain William Young, before moving to the 74-gun HMS Alcide, under Captain Sir Andrew Snape Douglas, and finally to the sloop HMS Bonetta, successively under Captains William Elliot and Graham Moore.

== French Revolutionary Wars ==
Kennedy then served aboard the 74-gun HMS Terrible, at first under Captain Skeffington Lutwidge, and then Captain George Campbell. With Terrible Kennedy went out to join the Mediterranean Fleet, and saw service ashore during the Siege of Toulon. He earned particular praise from Hyde Parker, the captain of the fleet under Admiral Lord Hood, for his role in bringing off 60 French civilians, mostly women, as the city fell to the republicans. Kennedy returned to Britain in 1794 aboard the frigate HMS Sybille, under Captain Edward Cooke, and afterwards transferred to the 36-gun HMS Lively. Kennedy served under two of her captains, Lord Garlies and George Burlton, before returning to HMS Sybille. He was promoted to lieutenant on 5 July 1796, while serving aboard Sybille, and went on to distinguish himself in January 1798 in an attack on a gunboat armed with five guns and carrying 50 men in the Bay of Manilla. Despite having only the ships' barge and 13 men, Kennedy nevertheless captured the gunboat and took possession of it. He was appointed to command his prize during an attack on Samboangon, on Maguindanao, carried out by Lively and HMS Fox.

Kennedy rejoined Lively after this, and continued in her until April 1798. His next appointment was to the 74-gun HMS Triumph, serving at first under Captain William Essington, and later under captains Thomas Seacombe, Eliab Harvey and Sir Robert Barlow. Terrible spent some time during this period as the flagship of Rear-Admiral Cuthbert Collingwood, and Kennedy served in the English Channel and in the Mediterranean.

== Napoleonic Wars ==
=== Trafalgar ===
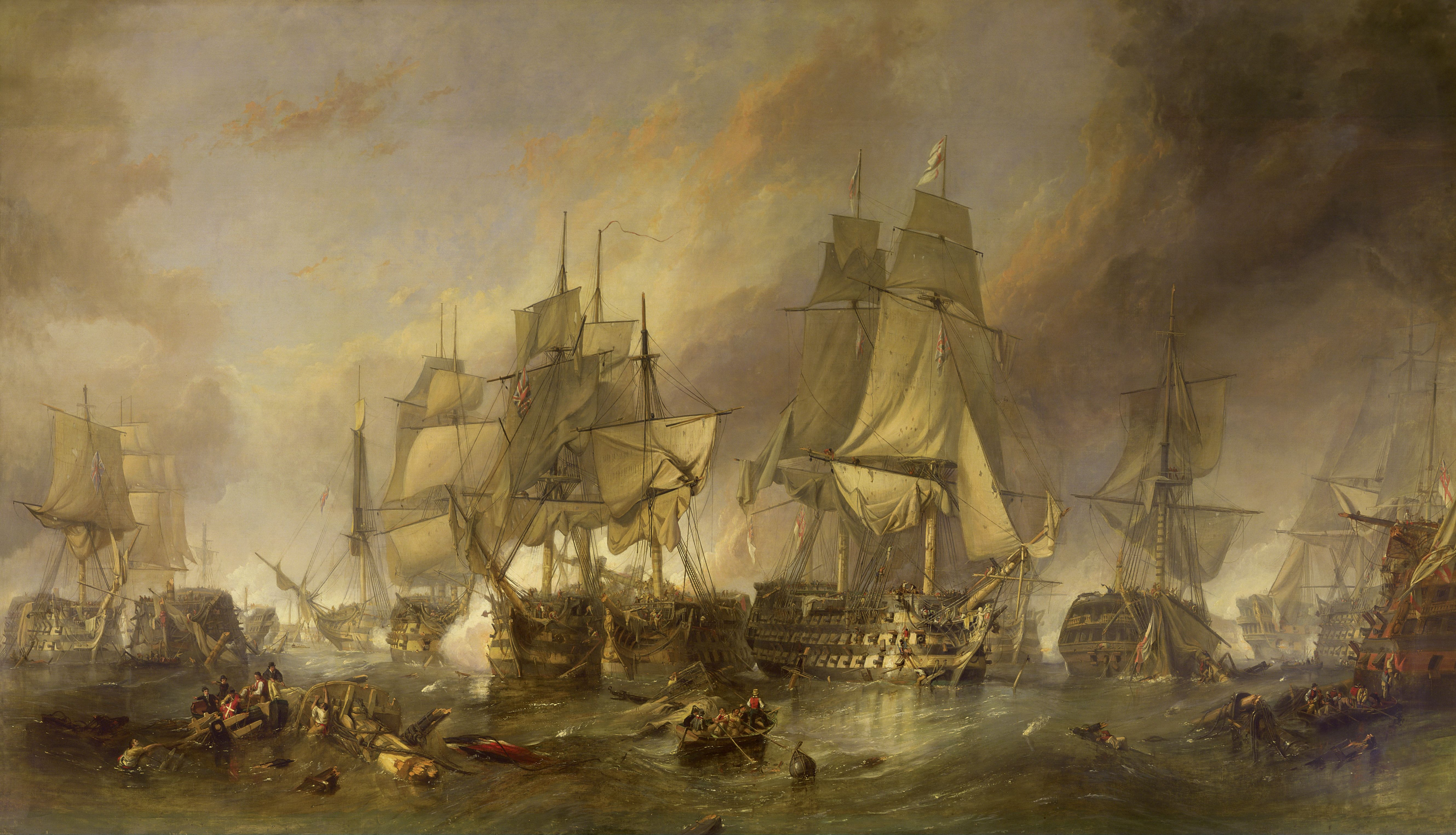
The Battle of Trafalgar, 1836 oil on canvas by Clarkson Frederick Stanfield. Stanfield shows the damaged Redoutable caught between the Victory (right foreground) and the Temeraire (left, seen bow on). The Fougueux, coming up on Temeraire's starboard side, has just received a broadside.

After leaving Triumph in January 1803, Kennedy took command of the small tender Eliza and Jane in 5 October until 15 November. His role was to convey impressed men from Dublin to Plymouth. He was then asked by his former commander, Eliab Harvey, to join him as his first-lieutenant aboard the 98-gun HMS Temeraire. Both Kennedy and Harvey fought at the Battle of Trafalgar on 21 October 1805, in which Temeraire was second in line behind Lord Nelson's flagship, the 100-gun HMS Victory. During the battle Temeraire was engaged in close action with two French warships, Redoutable and Fougueux. After firing several broadsides into Fougueux, Harvey ordered Kennedy to take command of a party of boarders and lead them onto Fougueux. Kennedy's party entered the French ship via her main deck ports and chains. The French tried to defend the decks port by port, but were steadily overwhelmed. Fougueux's captain, Louis Alexis Baudoin, had suffered a fatal wound earlier in the fighting, leaving Commander Francois Bazin in charge. On learning that nearly all of the officers were dead or wounded and that most of the guns were out of action, Bazin surrendered the ship to Kennedy.

=== Commander ===
Following the decisive victory at Trafalgar, a round of promotions were made to a number of the officers and men who had fought in the battle. Most of the first-lieutenants present at the battle were promoted to commander, and Kennedy duly received his promotion, dated 24 December 1805. The shortage of ships available for officers of his rank meant that it was not until 29 August 1808 that he received a posting, to the 10-gun HMS Cordelia. He commissioned her for service in the North Sea and in 1809 served in the Walcheren Campaign. While in command he took part in the capture of three privateers and a number of merchantmen, and later commanded a squadron of eight brigs tasked with blockading two 40-gun French frigates at Dunkirk. His blockade was successful, and being unable to escape, the frigates were eventually laid up. He was eventually promoted to post-captain on 4 December 1813, but did not receive another ship before the end of the Napoleonic Wars.

== Later years and family ==
The draw-down of the navy in peacetime offered few opportunities for further service, but on 24 June 1834 Kennedy received a posting as Captain-Superintendent at Sheerness Dockyard. At Sheerness at this time was the ship Kennedy had served on at Trafalgar, HMS Temeraire, now reduced to serving as a victualling hulk. Her final role was as a guardship at Sheerness, under the title 'Guardship of the Ordinary and Captain-Superintendent's ship of the Fleet Reserve in the Medway'. For the last two years of her service, from 1836 to 1838 she was under the nominal command of Captain Kennedy, in his post as Captain-Superintendent of Sheerness. Kennedy was now commander of the ship he had been first-lieutenant of at Trafalgar, and would be her last commander before her sale and disposal.

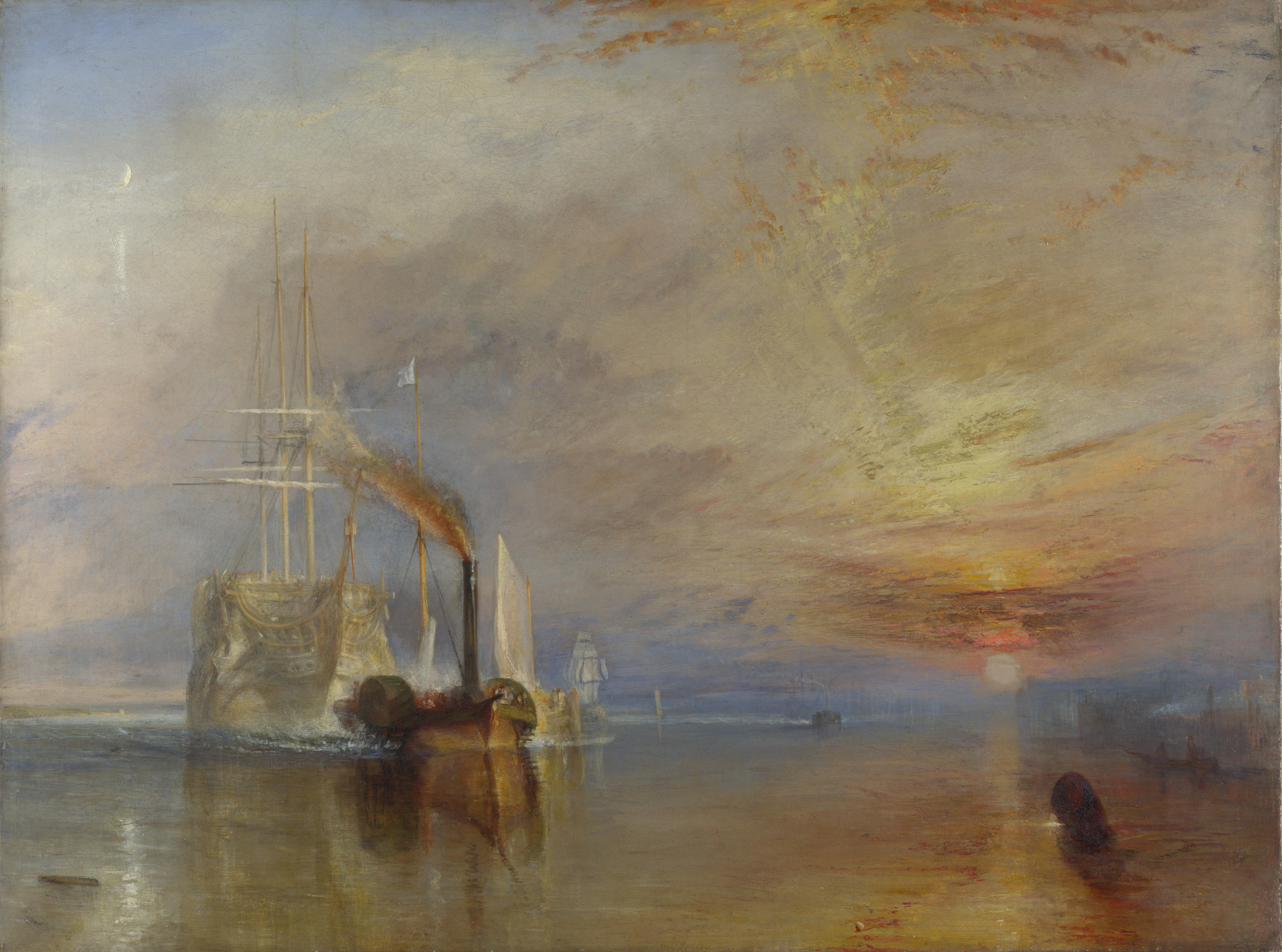
The Fighting Temeraire tugged to her last berth to be broken up, 1838, oil on canvas by J. M. W. Turner, 1838. Turner's depiction of the final voyage of the Temeraire was voted Britain's favourite painting in 2005.

Kennedy received orders from the Admiralty in June 1838 to have Temeraire valued in preparation for her sale out of the service, and work began on dismantling her on 4 July. Kennedy delegated this task to Captain Sir John Hill, commander of HMS Ocean. Temeraire was sold by Dutch auction on 16 August 1838 to John Beatson, a shipbreaker based at Rotherhithe, for £5,530. She was then towed up the Thames to his yard, a voyage that J. M. W. Turner depicted in his painting The Fighting Temeraire tugged to her last Berth to be broken up, 1838. Kennedy's commission did not long outlive Temeraire's. He left his post at Sheerness in 1838 and went into retirement, dying on 15 May 1846.

Kennedy married twice. His first marriage took place on 2 October 1806 to Louisa Adlam. The marriage produced two sons who survived him, both of whom entered the military and became officers: George Kennedy served in the Royal Artillery, and his brother Hugh Kennedy served in the Royal Marines. Kennedy remarried on 2 October 1834 to Hannah Kennedy, the widow of a Dr Kennedy, but no children are reported.
