= Pierre Lhermite =

Pierre-Louis Lhermite (French pronunciation: [pjɛʁ lwi lɛʁmit]; Dunkirk, 20 December 1761 — Dunkirk, 22 March 1828) was a French sea captain and rear admiral.

== Career ==
Lhermite started sailing at the age of eight in the merchant navy, steadily rising in rank until he was promoted to captain in 1787. He joined the French Navy in 1793 as a Lieutenant, serving on Tigre. Within a year, he was promoted to captain and served as flag officer to Rear-Admiral Van Stabel.

In 1794, Lhermite was appointed to Gasparin and took part in the Croisière du Grand Hiver under rear-admiral Renaudin. Gasparin returned to harbour without major damage.

In the following years, Lhermite undertook missions in Dunkirk, Rotterdam and Vlissingen, and organise the commissioning of a naval division in the Netherlands, bound for Santo Domingo to ferry troops. Lhermite then took command of the frigate Poursuivante in this division, on which he cruised the Caribbean. In Santo Domingo, he took command of the 74-gun Duguay-Trouin, on which he recaptured Petit-Goâve from the Haitian Revolutionaries, destroying her harbour and the village of Arcahaie afterwards.

After the collapse of the Treaty of Amiens in May 1803 and the outbreak of the War of the Third Coalition in May 1803, Lhermite was sent to France. He had to run the British Blockade of Saint-Domingue, and was chased by HMS Elephant while sailing off Cap-Haïtien. During her cruise, Duguay-Trouin ran aground in Jérémie and was refloated only by throwing 20 of her guns overboard, reducing her armament to 58 guns. On 25 July, Duguay-Trouin was attacked by a British ship of the line, which retreated when the frigate Guerrière came in sight. Lhermite, his armament diminished and fearing a ruse to lure him into a trap, decided against chasing the British ship. Duguay-Trouin and Guerrière continued together. On 30 August, off Finistere, they met the frigate HMS Boadicea; identifying the French ships as returning from Haiti, and with the knowledge that such ships were often armed en flûte and stricken with yellow fever, Boadicea decided to attack and approached under a French flag. However, Duguay-Trouin manoeuvered to intercept, and Boadicea fled after firing a broadside. On 2 September, Duguay-Trouin and Guerrière were chased by the division under Edward Pellew, and sought refugee in A Coruña. Guerrière came under fire and was damaged and her captain, Commander Louis Alexis Baudoin, was wounded.

From 1805 to 1808, Lhermite was in command of Genoa harbour and of the 74-gun Génois. He took part in expeditions to supply Corfu in the squadron of Vice-Admiral Ganteaume. In 1809, he was appointed to the 74-gun Albanais, in the Escaut squadron; later that year, he was promoted to Rear-Admiral but maintained in command of Albanais and supported Missiessy during his two battles with the Royal Navy during the Walcheren Campaign. In Missiessy's absence, he replaced him and acted as préfet maritime and overall commander of the French naval forces in the North Sea.

In 1814, at the Bourbon Restoration, Lhermite was inactivated. He was briefly reinstated préfet maritime of Dunkirk during the Hundred Days, but was again inactivated at the Second Bourbon Restoration. He retired in 1816.

== Honours ==
- Legion of Honour
- Order of Saint-Louis

== See also ==
- Jean-Marthe-Adrien l'Hermite

== Notes and references ==
=== Bibliography ===
- Levot, Prosper (1866). Les gloires maritimes de la France: notices biographiques sur les plus célèbres marins (in French). Bertrand.
- Troude, Onésime-Joachim (1867). Batailles navales de la France (in French). Vol. 3. Challamel ainé.
- Troude, Onésime-Joachim (1867). Batailles navales de la France (in French). Vol. 4. Challamel ainé.
