= Richard Maitland (disambiguation) =

Richard Maitland (1496–1586) was a Scottish poet.

Richard Maitland may also refer to:

- Sir Richard Maitland, 1st Baronet (died 1677) of the Maitland baronets
- Sir Richard Maitland, 2nd Baronet (died 1679) of the Maitland baronets
- Richard Maitland, 4th Earl of Lauderdale (1653–1695), Scottish politician
- Richard Maitland (British Army officer) (c. 1714–1763), officer of the Royal Artillery
