= French frigate Régénérée =

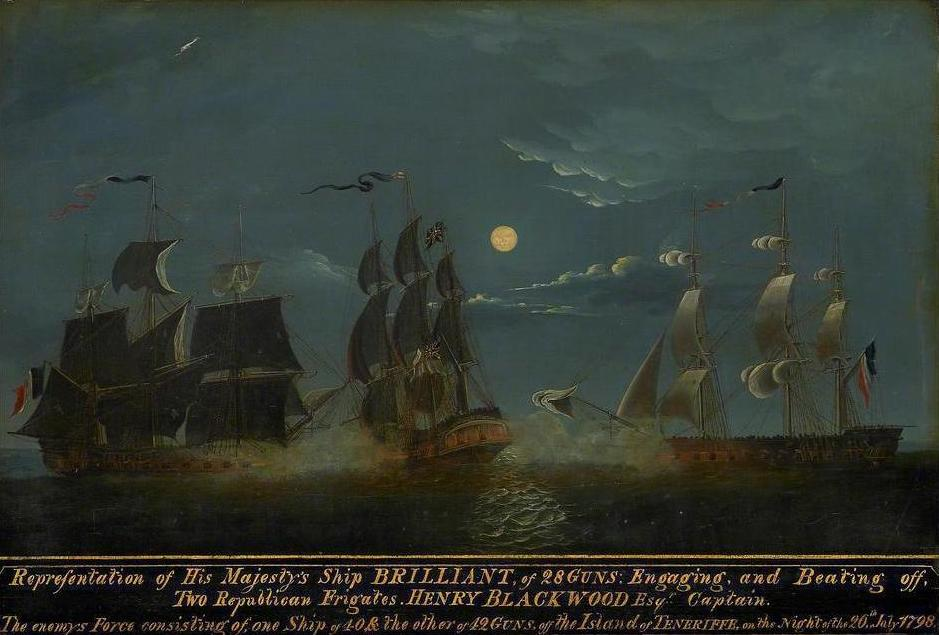
- Battle of Régénérée and Vertu against HMS Brilliant

History

France
- Name: Régénérée
- Ordered: 16 May 1793
- Builder: Saint Malo
- Laid down: September 1793
- Launched: 1 November 1794
- Completed: April 1795
- Captured: 27 September 1801

United Kingdom
- Name: HMS Alexandria
- Acquired: 27 September 1801
- Fate: Broken up 1804

General characteristics
- Class & type: Cocarde-class frigate
- Displacement: 1190 tonneaux
- Tons burthen: 590 port tonneaux; 895 20/94(bm)
- Length: 144 ft 3 in (43.97 m) (overall); 119 ft 8 1/2 in (36.487 m) (keel)
- Beam: 37 ft 6 in (11.43 m)
- Depth of hold: 11 ft 8 in (3.56 m)
- Crew: French service:209 (peace) & 282 (war); British service:200
- Armament: French service: Upper deck (UD):28 × 12-pounder guns; Spar deck:12 × 6-pounder guns; 4 × 36-pounder obusiers added later; British service: UD: 28 × 12-pounder guns; QD: 8 × 6-pounder guns; Fc: 2 × 6-pounder guns
- Armour: Timber

Régénérée was a 40-gun Cocarde-class frigate of the French Navy. The British captured her in 1801 at the fall of Alexandria, named her HMS Alexandria, sailed her back to Britain, but never commissioned her. She was broken up in 1804.

== Service ==
In 1796, she was commanded by captain Willaumez, in a squadron under Pierre César Charles de Sercey. On 15 May 1796 Forte , Vertu, Seine, and Régénérée were cruising between St Helena and the Cape of Good Hope hoping to capture British East Indiamen when they encountered the British whaler Lord Hawkesbury on her way to Walvis Bay. The French took off her crew, except for two seamen and a boy, and put Forte's fourth officer and 13-man prize crew aboard Lord Hawkesbury with orders to sail to Île de France. On her way there one of the British seamen, who was at the helm, succeeded in running her aground on the east coast of Africa a little north of the Cape, wrecking her. There were no casualties, but the prize crew became British prisoners.

Régénérée reached Île de France where she took part in the action of 8 September 1796. On 26 April 1797 she captured the American ship Betsey and took her into Rochefort. Between 24 and 27 April 1798, Régénérée and Vertu engaged the 32-gun sixth rate Pearl in an inconclusive action when Pearl had to pass between them before she could take refuge in St George's Bay, Sierra Leone. The action cost Pearl one man mortally wounded. A second inconclusive action occurred on 27 July 1798 when Régénérée and Vertu engaged the 28-gun sixth rate Brilliant off Tenerife, The action resulted in Brilliant losing three men killed and ten wounded before she could make her escape.

In early 1800, Régénérée left Rochefort with Africaine to ferry supplies to Alexandria. At the action of 19 February 1801, HMS Phoebe, under Captain Robert Barlow, captured Africaine east of Gibraltar. However, Régénérée managed to complete her mission, sailing into Alexandria on 2 March, having eluded the British blockade. The day before she had passed through the British fleet answering signals and without arousing any suspicion, until at last she hoisted the French flag as she headed into the harbor.

She remained there during the siege until the capitulation of Alexandria on 29 September 1801. The British discovered the French warships Cause, Égyptienne, Justice and Régénérée, and two Venetian frigates in the harbour of Alexandria at the capitulation. The British and their Turkish allies agreed a division of the spoils. The British received Egyptienne, Régénérée and "Venetian No. 2" - Léoben (aka Le Bion; ex-Venetian Medusa) - of 26 guns. Capitan Pacha (sic) received the 64-gun Causse (ex-Venetian Vulcano), Justice, of 46 guns, and "Venetian No. 1" - Mantoue (ex-Venetian Cerere, ex-French Cérės) - also of 26 guns. Additionally, the Turks received some Turkish corvettes that were in the harbour. (Note: One of these was the 12-gun corvette Héliopolis, which the French had captured at Alexandria in July 1798 and taken into service.) Admiral Lord Keith commander of the naval forces, gave the value of Régénérée for prize money purposes at £16,771 13s 6d.

== Fate ==
She was then temporarily brought into Royal Navy service as HMS Alexandria. Captain Alexander Wilson, who had brought Trusty to Alexandria and who had commanded the port, took command of Alexandria and sailed her back to Britain. She arrived in Portsmouth on 1 April 1802 from Malta. She sailed on 8 April for Chatham, where she was paid off; this was Wilson's last sea-going command. She was never commissioned and was broken up in 1804.
