= French frigate Vertu =

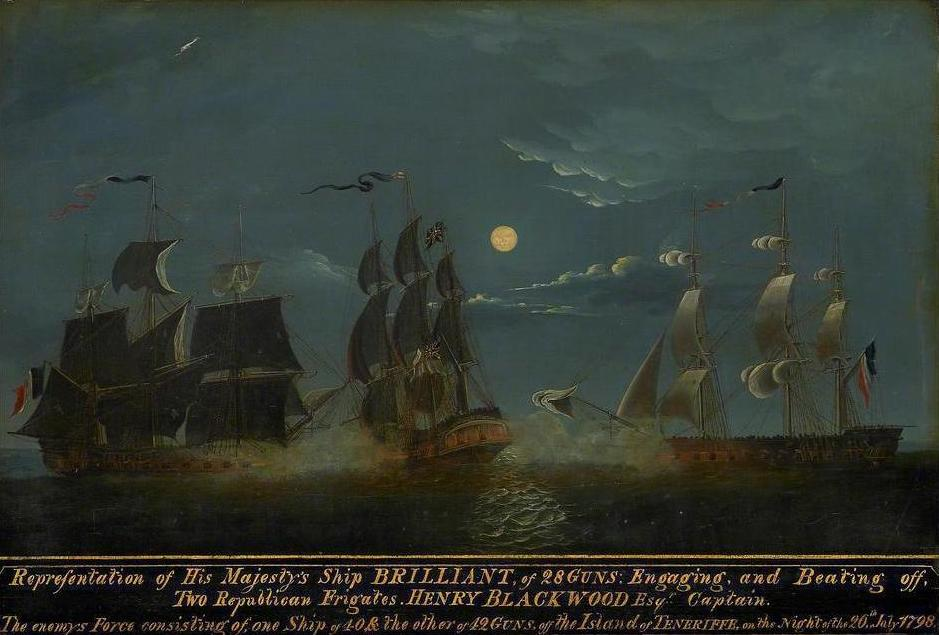
- Battle of Vertu and Régénérée against HMS Brilliant

History

France
- Name: Vertu
- Namesake: Virtue
- Ordered: 16 February 1793
- Builder: Lorient
- Laid down: October 1793
- Launched: 28 June 1794
- In service: September 1794
- Captured: 30 November 1803, by the Royal Navy

United Kingdom
- Name: HMS Virtu (Note: Roche (p.460) translated the name into "HMS Virtue")
- Acquired: 30 November 1803
- Fate: Broken up December 1810

General characteristics
- Class & type: 40-gun frigate
- Displacement: 1350 tonneaux
- Tons burthen: 646 port tonneaux
- Length: 46.8 metres
- Beam: 11.9 metres
- Draught: 5.7 metres
- Sail plan: Full-rigged ship
- Armament: UD: 28 × 18-pounder guns; QD & Fc: 12 × 18-pounder guns

Vertu was a 40-gun French frigate designed by engineer Segondat. She served in Sercey's squadron in the Indian Ocean, and in Saint-Domingue. She was captured by the Royal Navy at the end of the Blockade of Saint-Domingue when the island surrendered to the British. After her capture the Navy sailed her to Britain but never commissioned her, and finally sold her in 1810.

== French career ==
Ordered as Vertu at the height of the Reign of Terror, the frigate was commissioned in Lorient. In May 1793, she sailed from Brest to Île-d'Aix under Captain Montagniès-Laroque

She took part in the Croisière du Grand Hiver in December 1794, and escorted the 74-gun Redoutable after she broke her cables upon departure.

On 3 February, a violent gust of wind damaged Sercey's naval division, which was readying for a transit to Mauritius and a campaign in the Indian Ocean, damaging Cocarde; Vertu, under Lhermite, was chosen to replace her. The division departed Rochefort on 4 March 1796, leaving behind Vertu which had yet to complete her preparation and rejoined the division Palma.

On 15 May 1796 Forte, Vertu, Seine, and Régénérée were cruising between St Helena and the Cape of Good Hope hoping to capture British East Indiamen when they encountered the British whaler Lord Hawkesbury on her way to Walvis Bay. The French took off her crew, except for two seamen and a boy, and put Forte's fourth officer and 13-man prize crew aboard Lord Hawkesbury with orders to sail to Île de France. On her way there one of the British seamen, who was at the helm, succeeded in running her aground on the east coast of Africa a little north of the Cape, wrecking her. There were no casualties, but the prize crew became British prisoners.

The division arrived at Port-Louis on 18 June. There, Vertu took part in the various commerce raiding actions of the division, including the action of 8 September 1796, where she sustained more damage than her fellows; after the battle, she required a tow from Régénérée.

In August 1797, she ferried troop from Mauritius to Batavia. With dwindling support from the colony of Mauritius, Sercey had to send Régénérée, under Willaumez, and Vertu back to France. Vertu departed the Indian Ocean theatre in September, under Captain Magon, sailing from Mauritius to Rochefort and escorting two merchantmen of the Spanish Royal Company of the Philippines to Europe.

En route, the two frigates and two merchantmen stopped at Îles de Los to effect repair and gather water; they anchored at Tamara, Vertu disassembling her masts and yards to restore her rigging, while Régénérée sailed to the nearby island of Factori. On 24 April, the 32-gun Pearl, under Captain James Ballard, attacked Vertu; one hour into the battle, Régénérée, attracted by the cannonade, intervened and forced Pearl to flee. Régénérée unsuccessfully chased Pearl for 36 hours before abandoning the pursuit. (Note: Onésime-Joachim Troude, claims the ship that chased Pearl was the 40-gun Vertu, while William James, in his book, "The Naval History of Great Britain, Volume II, 1797–1799" (p.219), states Régénérée was the ship in pursuit. William Clowes on p. 510 of his book, "The Royal Navy, A History from the Earliest Times to 1900, Volume IV", says that both the frigates chased Pearl.)

On 10 May 1798, the ships departed for Europe. Arrived at Tenerife, the merchantmen were put under the care of the governor, as they considerably retarded the travel of the frigates. On 27 July, as the frigates prepared to pursue their journey, the 28-gun HMS Brilliant, under Henry Blackwood, sighted them. At 6, the French frigates put to sail and started firing on Brilliant; Régénérée was closing on her Brilliant when Vertu, which had sailed large, touched the wind; Régénérée imitated her manoeuvre, but lost her mizzen and bowsprit, allowing Brilliant to flee. Vertu gave chase, but could not overhaul Brilliant and returned to Tenerife. There, Régénérée replaced her rigging, and both frigates eventually arrived in Rochefort on 5 September.

In 1803, Vertu, under Commander Gallier-Labrosse, was part of a naval division under Rear-Admiral Jacques Bedout.

Under Commander Montalan, she sailed from Rochefort to Genoa, and from there, ferried troops to Saint-Domingue. At the Surrender of Cap Francais on 30 December, Vertu was in the harbour with Clorinde, under Pierre Lebozec. When Captain Barré, who commanded the naval forces at Saint-Domingue, informed them that their frigates would be surrendered to the British under the terms of the upcoming capitulation, Lebozec and Montalan attempted the run the British blockade. However the wind was so weak that day that the two frigates found themselves becalmed and threatened by the Haitian revolutionaries, and had to call the British for help. Commodore John Loring ordered Captain Bligh to rescue the French crew with the boats of the blockading ships. Eventually, the wind became more favourable and British prize crew managed to sail Vertu and Clorinde to the sea.

== British career and fate ==
Vertu arrived at Plymouth on 14 August 1804. The Royal Navy decided not to commission Virtu and never prepared her for sea. Instead, she languished until December 1810, when she was broken up.
