= Admiral Maitland =

Admiral Maitland may refer to:

- Anthony Maitland, 10th Earl of Lauderdale (1785–1863), British Royal Navy admiral
- John Maitland (Royal Navy officer) (1771–1836), British Royal Navy rear admiral
- Thomas Maitland, 11th Earl of Lauderdale (1803–1878), British Royal Navy admiral
