= Alexander Wilson (Royal Navy officer) =

Royal Navy officer

- Born: 12 January 1760
- Died: June 1834 (aged 74); Birchgrove, Wexford
- Military career
- Allegiance: United Kingdom
- Branch: Royal Navy
- Service years: 1777–1814
- Rank: Rear-Admiral
- Commands: HMS Alexander; HMS Kingfisher; HMS Boreas; HMS Flora; HMS Trusty; HMS Alexandria; Wexford Sea Fencibles
- Conflicts: American Revolutionary War; Battle of Ushant; Battle of Cape Henry; Siege of Yorktown; French Revolutionary War; Glorious First of June; Battle of Groix; Egypt Campaign; Battle of Abukir; Napoleonic Wars
- Awards: Order of the Crescent

Rear-Admiral Alexander Wilson (12 January 1760 – June 1834) was a Royal Navy officer most notable for his rise to flag rank from his position as a common seaman. Wilson joined the navy in 1777 and soon after became coxswain to Alexander Hood. By 1778 Wilson had been made a midshipman, fighting at the Battle of Ushant and Battle of Cape Henry. Wilson was promoted to lieutenant in 1787 and, continuing to serve with Hood, fought at the Glorious First of June and Battle of Groix before being promoted to commander.

After a brief command of HMS Kingfisher Wilson was promoted to post-captain on 2 September 1795. He temporarily commanded HMS Flora in 1798, and in 1801 joined the troopship HMS Trusty. Trusty then participated in the Battle of Abukir. Returning home from the Egypt Campaign in 1802 in command of HMS Alexandria, Wilson's ship was laid up. He went on to command the Wexford Sea Fencibles through the Napoleonic Wars, but never again went to sea. He was made a superannuated rear-admiral in 1814.

== Naval career ==
=== American Revolutionary War ===
Alexander Wilson was born on 12 January 1760. As a child he aspired to become a sailor, and in an attempt to halt this his family sent him to serve on a West Indiaman commanded by his uncle. Wilson was not swayed by this experience, and joined the Royal Navy in 1777. Wilson was sent to serve on the 74-gun ship of the line HMS Robust, which was one of the ships activated to serve in the Channel Fleet at the beginning of the American Revolutionary War. The commander of Robust, Captain Alexander Hood, was impressed by Wilson's seamanship and appointed him to serve as his coxswain.

Wilson was rewarded for his good conduct as coxswain, and by the middle of 1778 had been promoted to midshipman. He fought in Robust at the Battle of Ushant on 27 July of that year, in which the ship had five men killed and seventeen wounded. Hood afterwards left the ship, but Wilson stayed on under the new captain, Captain Phillips Cosby. On 1 May 1779 Robust sailed in a squadron under the command of Rear-Admiral Mariot Arbuthnot to join the North American Station.

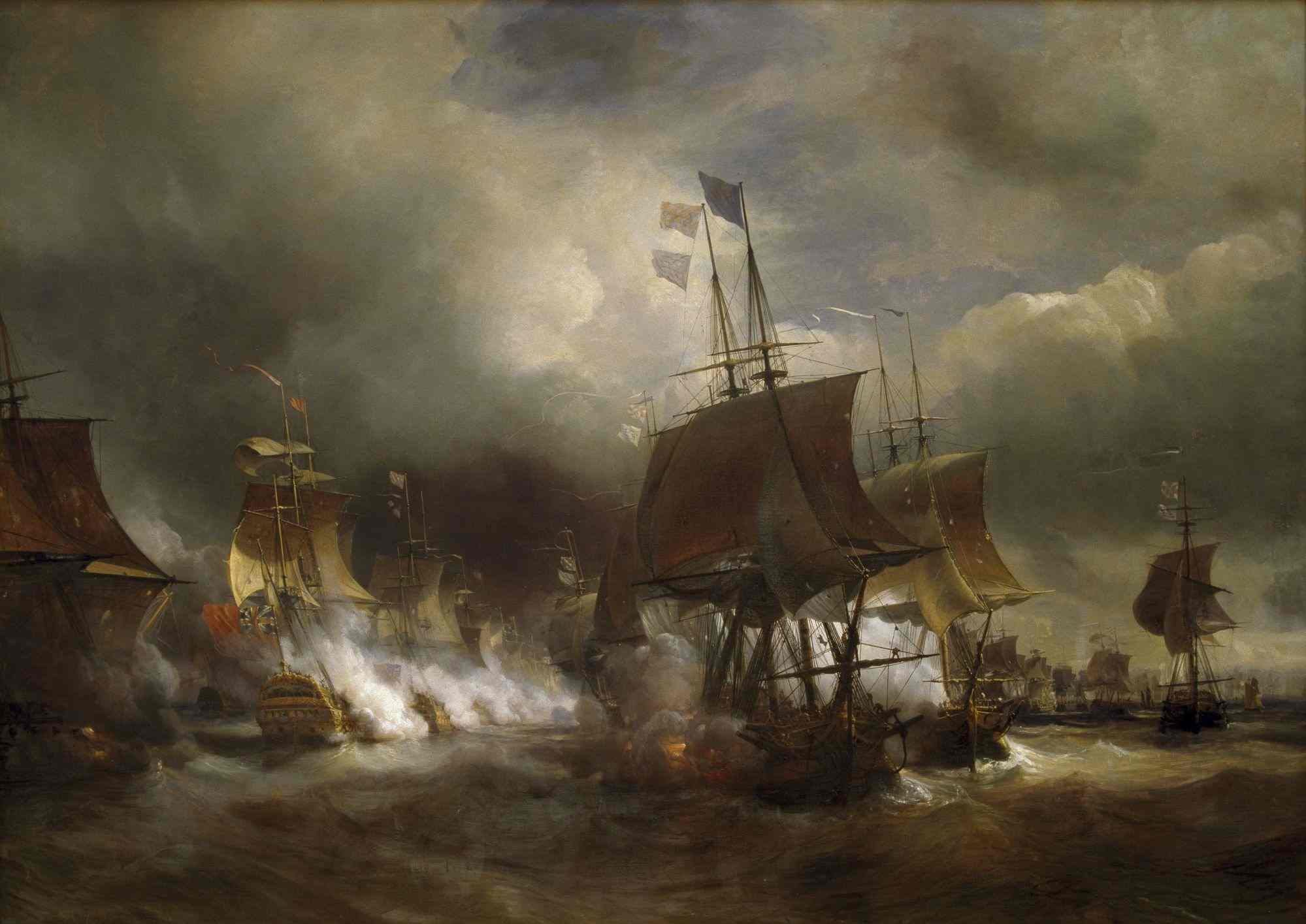
The Battle of Ushant, at which Wilson served in HMS Robust

Arbuthnot's squadron served off Chesapeake Bay, and on 16 March 1781 fought the Battle of Cape Henry there. Robust led the British line into the opposing French fleet, with Wilson serving as the signals midshipman during the battle. The ship received the most damage among the British fleet because of her prominent position, but the descent of some fog made the battle an indecisive encounter. Wilson received a severe wound to the right arm during the fighting, being one of twenty-three men wounded alongside a further fifteen killed.

Robust was heavily damaged structurally at Cape Henry, and had to go into New York for repairs, with her crew thus missing the Battle of the Chesapeake on 5 September. The ship returned to sea, still in a poor state, in October, forming part of the fleet that made an aborted attempt to save Lieutenant-General Lord Cornwallis' army at the Siege of Yorktown. Robust was afterwards ordered to sail to England for further repairs, but was judged unfit to survive the crossing in her current state. The ship instead went to Antigua where repairs were completed, and Wilson finally returned home in the ship in the summer of 1782. Robust was then paid off.

=== Peace ===
After the American Revolutionary War came to a close, Wilson continued in the Royal Navy. He served in this period on board the 74-gun ship of the line HMS Triumph followed by the 98-gun ship of the line HMS Barfleur, the latter of which was the flagship of Vice-Admiral Lord Hood, the Commander-in-Chief, Portsmouth. Wilson was promoted to lieutenant on 24 September 1787, at which point he went on half pay. After around eighteen months of this Wilson was appointed to the 16-gun sloop HMS Nautilus. He served as Nautilus's first lieutenant for three years on the Newfoundland Station.

Wilson had a successful term in post on Nautlius, and was noticed by Captain Edward Pellew. When Pellew was given command of the 36-gun frigate HMS Nymphe, he requested that Wilson become his first lieutenant. Wilson declined the appointment because he wanted to instead wait until his old captain Hood, now a vice-admiral, received a command which he could join.

=== French Revolutionary Wars ===
At the start of the French Revolutionary Wars in 1793, Hood was given the 100-gun ship of the line HMS Royal George as his flagship in the English Channel, and Wilson was appointed to the ship. Royal George subsequently fought at the Glorious First of June in 1794, at which battle Wilson was wounded. The British fleet afterwards returned to their base at Spithead, where Wilson was appointed as Royal George's first lieutenant. In this position he fought at the Battle of Groix on 23 June 1795. In the aftermath of the battle Wilson was selected to take command of one of the French ships captured, the 74-gun ship of the line Alexandre, for her return to port. He was promoted to commander on 29 June, and for a period continued in temporary command of the newly recommissioned HMS Alexander.

In August Wilson was given his first true command, the 16-gun sloop HMS Kingfisher, tasked with taking dispatches to Vice-Admiral Thomas Pringle in the North Sea. Wilson returned from this voyage and was promoted to post-captain on 2 September. He was given command of the 28-gun frigate HMS Boreas, which was in ordinary at Sheerness Dockyard, before going on a period of half pay. In around May 1798 he was appointed temporary captain of the 36-gun frigate HMS Flora, which was serving in the Mediterranean Sea. Captain Robert Gambier Middleton returned to take command of Flora again soon afterwards. In early 1800 Wilson was sent to join the 50-gun fourth-rate HMS Trusty, which was armed en flute as a troopship. In Trusty Wilson joined a squadron of three ships of the line, two frigates, and a bomb vessel, which sailed to Cork to join Admiral Lord Keith's fleet.

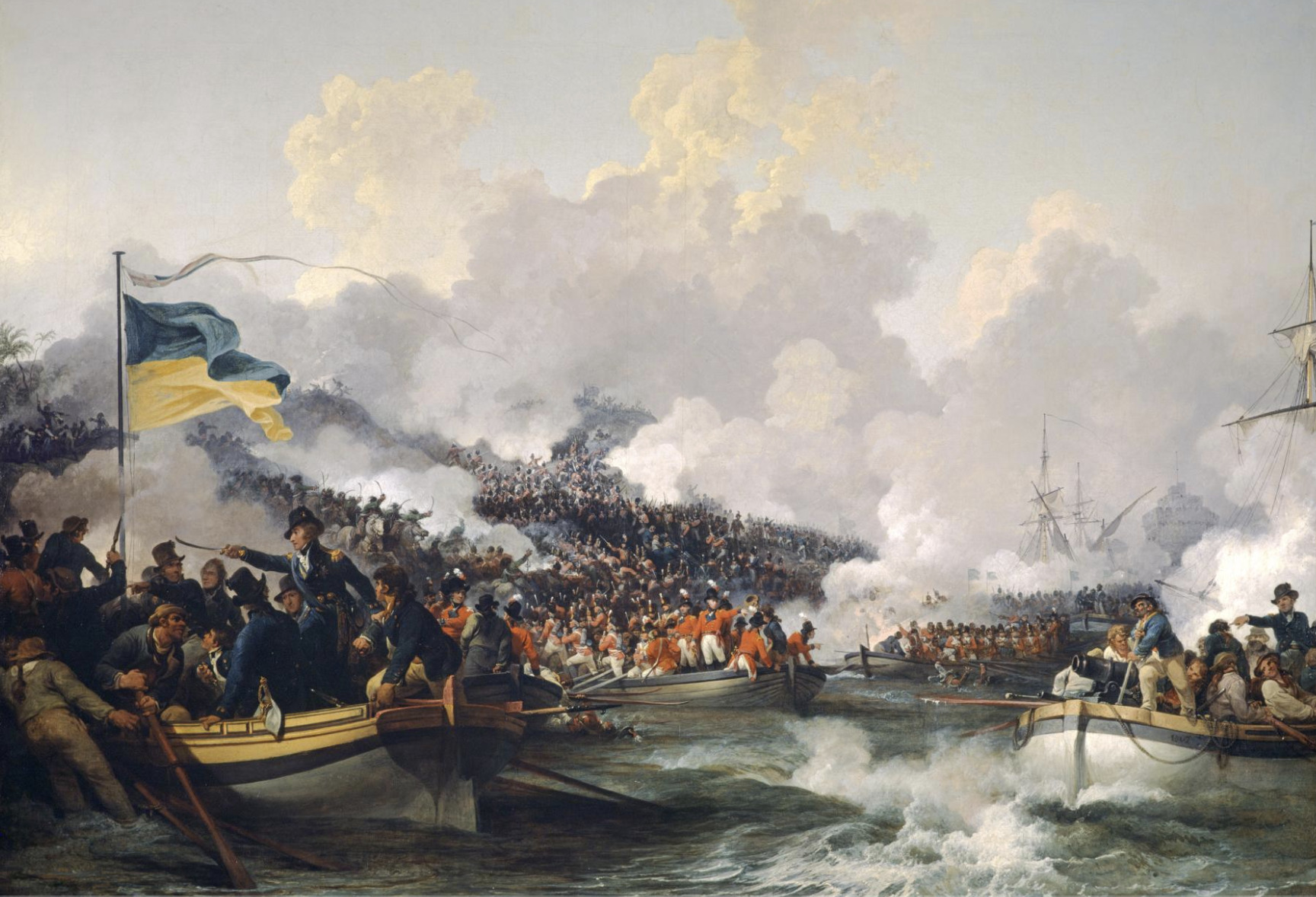
The British landings at the Battle of Abukir, where Wilson's HMS Trusty was one of the troopships

The fleet subsequently sailed to the Mediterranean, arriving off Cádiz in October. Sent to support the British response to the French campaign in Egypt and Syria, they reached Alexandria on 1 March 1801. Having embarked a portion of Major-General George Ludlow's Guards Brigade, Trusty participated in the landings at the Battle of Abukir on 8 March. Subsequent to this, Keith began to sail off the Egyptian coast with his ships of the line. Wilson was left in Aboukir Bay with upwards of fifty vessels under his command. He also had control over the transport ships working to supply and assist the army ashore, and was in command of the port as a whole. As the campaign found success Wilson was one of many officers awarded the Turkish gold medal. Keith wrote that Wilson was "indefatigable in his duties of the port".

Some time after this Wilson was translated from Trusty into the command of the 38-gun frigate HMS Alexandria, which had been the French frigate Régénérée until captured on 2 September. Wilson returned to England in Alexandria, arriving at Sheerness in early 1802. The ship was then officially commissioned into the Royal Navy, but was never fitted for service and was instead laid up at Chatham Dockyard. Alexandria was broken up in April 1804 and Wilson was left on half pay. This was his last active sea service in the Royal Navy.

=== Napoleonic Wars and retirement ===
Wilson stayed on half pay until 1805 when he was chosen to replace Captain Josias Rowley as commander of the Wexford Sea Fencibles. He continued to apply for the command of another ship throughout this period, but was unsuccessful. As such Wilson spent the entirety of the rest of the Napoleonic Wars with the Sea Fencibles, only relinquishing his position when the unit was paid off towards the end of the conflict. On 18 July 1814 he was promoted to become a superannuated rear-admiral, in effect being promoted into retirement. This also meant he could not receive further promotion through the flag ranks.

Wilson was highly disappointed to be put in this position; embittered, he believed that it had occurred because he did not have enough powerful support behind his career. His unusual rise from common seaman to commissioned officer has been compared by naval historian N. A. M. Rodger to the careers of Captain John Quilliam, Rear-Admiral John Pasco, and Rear-Admiral Sir Thomas Troubridge, all of whom had similarly humble beginnings. In retirement Wilson lived at Birchgrove, Wexford; he died there in June 1834. While little is recorded of Wilson's personal life, his son James Henry Richard Wilson also joined the Royal Navy. He became a lieutenant in 1825, and commanded the Putney Heath semaphore station.
