= Lord Hawkesbury (1787 ship) =

History

U.S.
- Launched: 1781
- Fate: Sold c.1787

Great Britain
- Name: Lord Hawkesbury
- Namesake: Charles Jenkinson, 1st Earl of Liverpool
- Owner: 1787: A. & B. Champion; 1792:Daniel Bennet
- Acquired: 1787 by purchase
- Captured: 15 May 1796
- Fate: Wrecked 26 May 1796

General characteristics
- Tons burthen: 205, or 219 (bm)
- Length: 89 ft 0 in (27.1 m)
- Beam: 25 ft 3 1/2 in (7.7 m)
- Notes: Two decks and three masts

Lord Hawkesbury was launched in the United States in 1781, probably under another name. She entered Lloyd's Register in 1787. She made six voyages as a whaler. On her second whaling voyage she "the first parcel of ambergris 'by any English whaler'". She was lost on the seventh after a squadron of French naval vessels had captured her. One of her original, British crew succeeded in regaining sufficient control from her prize crew to enable him to run her aground, wrecking her.

== Career ==
Lord Hawkesbury first appeared in Lloyd's Register in 1787. Her master was T. Delano, her owners A[lexander] and Benjamin] Champion, and her trade London-Southern Fishery.

1st whaling voyage (1787–1788): Captain Thomas Delano sailed from England on 7 September 1787, bound for South Georgia. He returned on 12 September 1788 with 35 tuns of sperm oil, eight tuns of whale oil, and four hundredweight (cwt) of whale bone (baleen).

Lord Hawkesbury, Henry Delano, master, may have made an earlier seal hunting voyage to South Georgia. One report has her there in 1786.

2nd whaling voyage (1788–1789): Captain Delano sailed from England on 14 November 1788. He hunted whales in the Atlantic. In January 1789 Lord Hawkesbury and several other whalers, including Spy, were "all well" off the coast of Guinea. Lord Hawkesbury returned on 25 August 1789 with 34 tuns of sperm oil and reportedly "the first parcel of ambergris 'by any English whaler'".

3rd whaling voyage (1789–1790): Captain Joshua Coffin sailed from England on 15 October 1789. He hunted whales in the Atlantic and returned to England on 6 December 1790. Lord Hawkesbury brought 76 tons sperm oil and headmatter, and 360 ounces of ambergris, which sold at £19 6s per ounce.

4th whaling voyage (1791–1792): Captain Barnabas Gardner sailed from England on 16 February 1791. He too hunted for whales in the Atlantic and returned to England on 27 April 1792.

The Champions sold Lord Hawkesbury to Daniel Bennett, a leading shipowner of whalers sailing the Southern Whale Fishery.

5th whaling voyage (1792–1793): Captain William Wilkinson sailed from England on 8 September 1792, bound for the Atlantic and the west coast of Africa. He returned on 4 October 1793. Lord Hawkesbury brought back 55 tuns of sperm oil, 60 tuns of whale oil, 40 cwt of whale bone.

6th whaling voyage (1794): Captain Mackay (or Henry Mackie), sailed from England on 21 January 1794, bound for Walvis Bay. He returned on 29 November with eight tuns of sperm oil, 110 tuns of whale oil, and 75 cwt of whale bone.

== Capture and loss ==
Lord Hawkesbury set out on a seventh voyage under Captain Mackay. She was lost on 26 May 1796 near the Cape of Good Hope.

Lord Hawkesbury stopped at Rio de Janeiro in March 1796. Some of the crew had scurvy, and she was in need of refreshments, and calefaction. She was sailing for the whaling grounds at Walvis Bay when on 15 May 1796 at 31°S 8°E she encountered a squadron of four large French frigates. These were:

- Forte (50 guns; Commander Beaulieu-Leloup)
- Vertu (40 guns; Lhermitte)
- Seine (40 guns; Latour and later Bigot)
- Régénérée (36 guns; Willaumez)

They were part of a larger force under Admiral Sercey. He had taken his force on to Île de France but had left the four frigates to patrol between St Helena and the Cape to intercept and capture East Indiamen of the British East India Company (EIC).

The French pillaged Lord Hawkesbury and put a prize crew on board her consisting of an officer and 13 seamen. They took off almost all of her crew, leaving only two sailors, David Liang and Robert Morrow, and a boy to help the prize crew sail her to Île de France.

On 26 May 1796 Lord Hawkesbury was off the east coast of Africa with Morrow at the helm. The French were not paying attention and Morrow succeeded in running her aground at Zoetendal's Vlei (34°43′S 20°8′E), east of Simon's Bay. Although she was wrecked, there were no casualties and Morrow, Liang, and the boy left the Frenchmen in the custody of local Boers. The Englishmen then walked to Cape Town, arriving there on 4 June.
