= Antoine Marie François Montalan =

French Navy officer (1767–1818)

Captain Antoine Marie François Montalan (19 March 1767 – 22 March 1818) was a French Navy officer who served in the French Revolutionary and Napoleonic Wars.

== Early life ==
Montalan was born to Marguerite Gastaldy and Jean-François Montalan, an industrialist of Lyon, on 19 March 1767. He started sailing in the Compagnie de Calonne in 1787 as a volunteer. By 1792, Montalan has risen to the rank of Second Captain in the merchant navy.

== French Revolutionary Wars ==
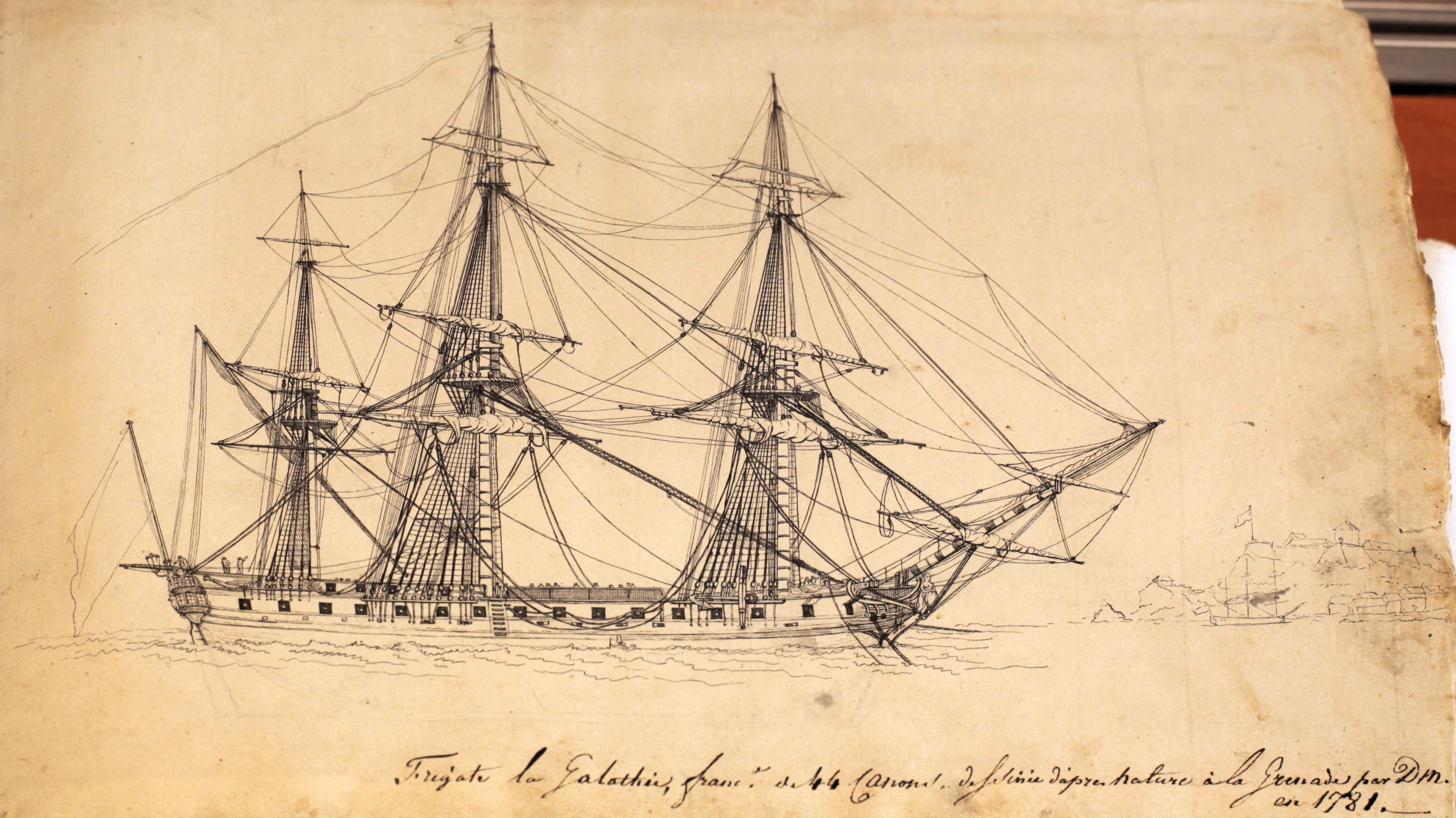
Galathée, which Montalan served on, in 1781

On 12 February 1792, Montalan joined the Navy as an enseigne de vaisseau non entretenu (junior ensign), serving on the corvette Vanneau and later on the frigate Résolue. In 1793, he was promoted to lieutenant. He was appointed to Galathée from November 1793 to March 1794, and then on Sans Pareil. On 19 March 1794, Montalan received his first command, the corvette Tourterelle. On 15 May 1795, Tourterelle met the British frigate Lively, and struck after a four-hour battle. Montalan subsequently underwent a court-martial or the loss of his ship, and was unanimously acquitted on 20 May 1796.

Promoted to Commander on 21 March 1796, Montalan was given command of Résolue, and took part in the Expédition d'Irlande as Nielly's flagship. In the night of 22 to 23 December, she accidentally collided with Redoutable, losing her of her bowsprit, foremast, and mizzen; only her mainmast stayed upright. the 74-gun Pégase took Résolue in tow and returned with her to Brest, where they arrived on 30 December;

In 1797, Montalan took command of a frigate division comprising Sémillante, Fraternité and the corvette Berceau, with his flag on Sémillante, ferrying General Gabriel, comte d'Hédouville to Saint Domingue. In 1799, he took command of another division, composed of Sémillante, Charente and two avisos to bring despatches to Admiral Étienne Eustache Bruix. On 9 April 1799, Sémillante along with Vengeance and Cornélie, encountered and fought HMS St Fiorenzo and HMS Amelia off Belle Île. The engagement was indecisive, with the French ships escaping up the Loire. The British suffered three men killed and 35 wounded.

After the decommissioning of Sémillante on 19 July 1802, Montalan was appointed to captain Vertu in September. Commanding a frigate division, he was sent to Saint Domingue to recapture Gonaïves from Black rebels. He was promoted to Captain 2nd Class on 24 September 1803. After the British blockade of Saint-Domingue resulted in the capitulation of General Donatien de Rochambeau in December 1803, Montalan was taken to Jamaica as a prisoner of war, and eventually returned to France the next year.

== Napoleonic Wars ==
In 1808, Montalan was appointed to command Robuste. In April 1809, he transferred to Génois, which he captained until 1814. Montalan died on 22 March 1818.

== Sources and references ==
=== Bibliography ===
- Fonds Marine. Campagnes (opérations; divisions et stations navales; missions diverses). Inventaire de la sous-série Marine BB4. Tome premier : BB4 1 à 482 (1790-1826)
- Quintin, Danielle; Quintin, Bernard (2003). Dictionnaire des capitaines de Vaisseau de Napoléon (in French). S.P.M. ISBN 2-901952-42-9.
- Roche, Jean-Michel (2005). Dictionnaire des bâtiments de la flotte de guerre française de Colbert à nos jours. Vol. 1. Group Retozel-Maury Millau. ISBN 978-2-9525917-0-6. OCLC 165892922. (1671-1870)
- Rouvier, Charles (1868). Histoire des marins français sous la République, de 1789 à 1803 (in French). Arthus Bertrand.
