= French ship Redoutable (1795) =

Ship of the line of the French Navy

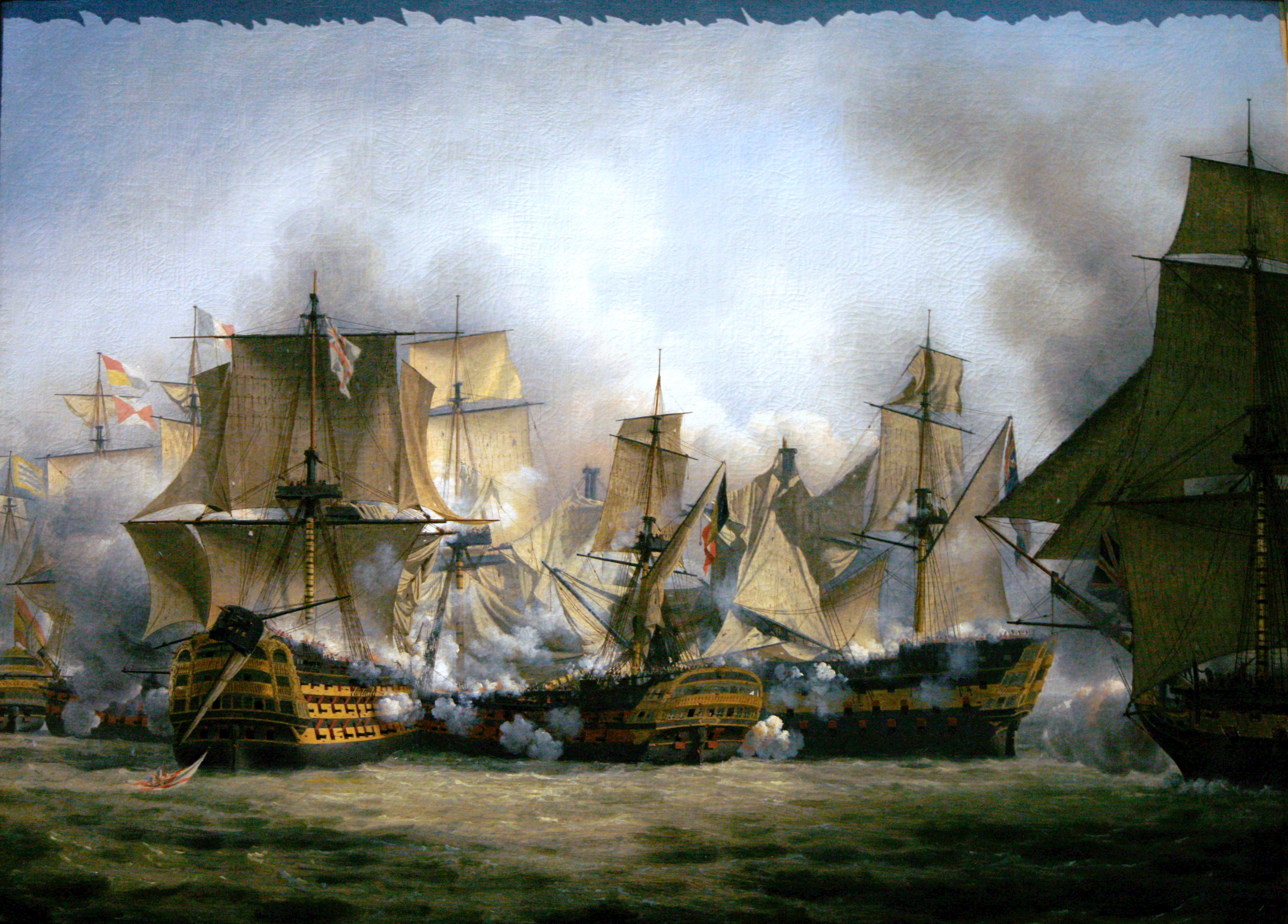
- Redoutable (centre) at the Battle of Trafalgar

History

France
- Namesake: Suffren de Saint Tropez
- Builder: Brest Naval Dockyard
- Laid down: 15 January 1789
- Launched: 31 May 1791 as Suffren
- Christened: 24 March 1789
- Completed: December 1792
- Renamed: to Redoutable on 20 May 1795
- Honours and awards: French Revolutionary Wars; Croisière du Grand Hiver; Battle of Groix; French expedition to Ireland (1796); Saint-Domingue expedition; Napoleonic Wars; Trafalgar campaign; Battle of Trafalgar
- Fate: Sunk, 22 October 1805

General characteristics
- Class & type: Téméraire-class ship of the line
- Displacement: 3,069 tonneaux
- Tons burthen: 1,537 port tonneaux
- Length: 55.87 m (183 ft 4 in)
- Beam: 14.46 m (47 ft 5 in)
- Draught: 7.15 m (23.5 ft)
- Depth of hold: 7.15 m (23 ft 5 in)
- Sail plan: Full-rigged ship
- Crew: 705
- Armament: 74 guns: Lower gun deck: 28 × 36 pdr guns; Upper gun deck: 30 × 18 pdr guns; Forecastle and Quarterdeck: 16 × 8 pdr guns

Redoutable was a 74-gun Téméraire-class ship of the line built for the French Navy during the 1790s. She took part in the battles of the French Revolutionary Wars in the Brest squadron, served in the Caribbean in 1803, and duelled with HMS Victory during the Battle of Trafalgar, killing Vice-admiral Horatio Nelson. Redoutable sank in the storm that followed the battle.

Built as Suffren, the ship was commissioned in the Brest squadron of the French fleet. After her crew took part in the Quibéron mutinies, she was renamed to Redoutable. She took part in the Croisière du Grand Hiver, the Battle of Groix, and the French expedition to Ireland. At the Peace of Amiens, Redoutable was sent to the Caribbean for the Saint-Domingue expedition, ferrying troops to Guadeloupe and Haiti.

Later, she served in the fleet under Vice-admiral Villeneuve, and took part in the Trafalgar campaign. At the Battle of Trafalgar, Redoutable rushed to cover the flagship Bucentaure when the ship following her failed to maintain the line. She tried in vain to stop Nelson's Victory from breaking the line and raking Bucentaure, and then engaged her with furious cannon and small arms fire that silenced Victory and killed Nelson. As her crew prepared to board Victory, HMS Temeraire raked Redoutable with grapeshot, killing or maiming most of the crew. Redoutable continued to fight until she was in danger of sinking before striking her colours. She foundered in the storm of 22 October 1805.

== Career ==
The ship of the line was laid down at Brest in January 1789, and launched as Suffren on 31 May 1791. She was the first ship of the French Navy named in honour of Vice-admiral Suffren de Saint Tropez, who had died a hero of the American War of Independence on 8 December 1788. She was completed there in December 1792.

=== Quibéron mutinies ===
Suffren was attached to the Brest fleet under Vice-admiral de Grimouard, later replaced by Morard de Galles. Under Captain Obet, she departed Brest in 1793 for a cruise to Quibéron. In September, the crews of the fleet revolted in the Quibéron mutinies, including the crew of Suffren. In retaliation, Suffren was renamed Redoutable on 20 May 1795. The same day, she received the new naval flag of the Republic, the full tricolour which replaced the white flag with a tricolour canton, and hoisted her.

=== Service in Brest ===
From March to June 1794 under Captain Dorré, she was the flagship of the naval station of Cancale. She comprised the Cancale division together with her sister ship Nestor, under Captain Monnier.

In December, she took part in the Croisière du Grand Hiver under Captain Pierre Augustin Moncousu; upon departure, she broke her cables, but unlike the ill-fated Républicain, she managed to reach the open sea, followed by the frigate Vertu. However, the damage sustained in the incident forced her to cancel her departure, and she returned to Brest.

In February 1795, the Suffren was the flagship of a division under Counter-admiral Yves-Joseph de Kerguelen-Trémarec within the fleet of Brest, under Villaret-Joyeuse. The ship was renamed Redoutable on 20 May 1795. Still under Captain Moncousu and with Commander César-Joseph Bourayne as first officer, she took part in the Battle of Groix on 23 June 1795, where her poor sailing properties compelled the frigate Virginie, under Captain Jacques Bergeret, to take her in tow. During the battle, she was one of the few ships of observe Villaret-Joyeuse's orders to support Alexandre. Later, along with Tigre, she attempted to support Formidable, but to no avail as Formidable's tops caught fire and she ceased all resistance to save herself, eventually striking her colours. After the battle, she sailed back to Port-Louis, near Lorient,

In December 1796, Redoutable took part in the French expedition to Ireland under Moncousu, by then promoted to counter admiral, and was the first French ship to reach Bantry Bay, after rallying elements of the French fleet. In the night of 22 to 23 December, she accidentally collided with Nielly's flagship, the frigate Résolue, dismasting her of her bowsprit, foremast, and mizzen; only her mainmast stayed upright. the 74-gun Pégase took Résolue in tow and returned with her to Brest, where they arrived on 30 December; Redoutable eventually limped back to Brest, where she arrived on 5 January 1797, in consort with Fougueux, Trajan, Neptune and Tourville, and four frigates.

=== Service in the Caribbean ===
In March 1802, the Redoutable was the flagship of a squadron of two ships of the line and four frigates under Admiral François Joseph Bouvet sent to reinforce Guadeloupe in 1802 and in the Saint-Domingue expedition in 1803, departing on 9 January from Ajaccio with troops and arriving on 4 February.

In 1803, Redoutable, under Captain Siméon, was part of a naval division under Counter-admiral Jacques Bedout, based in Saint-Domingue. The division was composed of the 74-gun Argonaute as flagship, with Captain Bourdé as Bedout's flag officer; the 74-guns Redoutable and Aigle, under Captain Pierre-Paulin Gourrège; the frigate Vertu, under Commander Antoine-Marie-François Montalan; and the corvettes Serpente, under Commander Gallier-Labrosse, and Éole, under Lieutenant Descorches.

=== Battle of Trafalgar ===
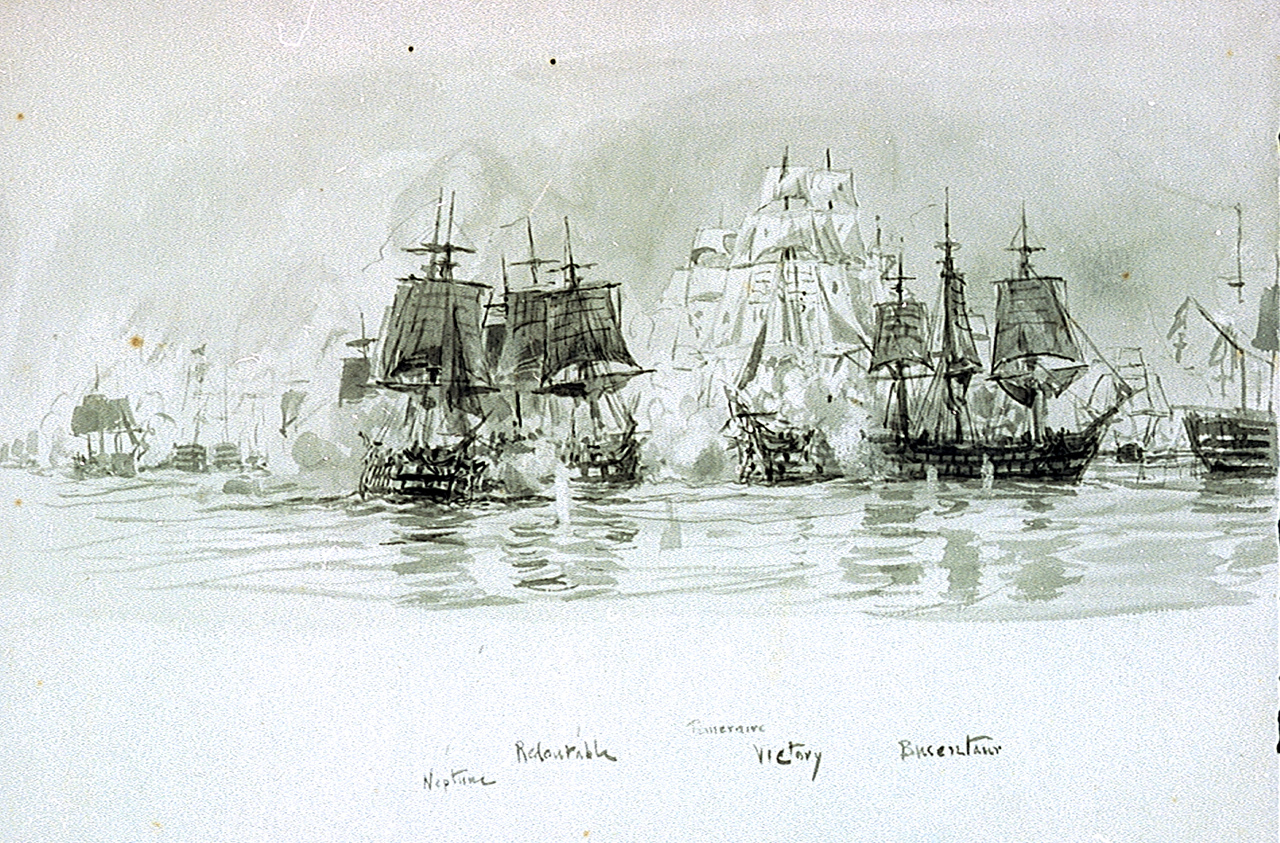
Redoutable (second from left) overtakes Neptune (far left), rushing to cover the aft of Bucentaure (far right) from Nelson's Victory (centre).

At the Battle of Trafalgar, on 21 October 1805, Redoutable was commanded by Captain Jean Jacques Etienne Lucas, with Lieutenant Jean Dupotet as first officer. (Note: Amongst the officers of Redoutable was also Acting Lieutenant Ducrest de Villeneuve (Levot, p.137)) Redoutable was the third ship behind the flagship Bucentaure in the French line, coming behind Esprit-Tranquille Maistral's Neptune and José Quevedo's San Leandro. When Neptune and San Leandro dropped behind Bucentaure, exposing her stern, Redoutable rushed to cover her and prevent Vice Admiral Horatio Nelson's Victory from cutting the Franco-Spanish line of battle.

With her bowsprit almost touching Bucentaure's stern, Redoutable fired on Victory's rigging for ten minutes, trying to disable her to prevent the crossing of the French line, but did not manage to stop her advance, despite cutting off her foremast tops, her mizzen and her main topgallant, and ended up running afoul of her. A furious, fifteen-minute musket duel erupted between the two ships; the crew of Redoutable had been especially trained by Lucas for such an occasion, (Note: Guérin especially mentions that Lucas drilled his crew to throw grenades and had bags made for his men, holding two grenades each. (vol.6, pp.423-424)) and soon the heavy hand grenade and small-arms fire on Victory's quarterdeck mortally wounded Vice Admiral Nelson. Lucas later reported:

A violent small-arms exchange ensued (...); our fire became so superior that within fifteen minutes, we had silenced that of Victory; (...) her castles were covered with dead and wounded, and admiral Nelson was killed by our gunfire. Almost at once, the castles of the enemy ship were evacuated and Victory completely ceased fighting us; but boarding her proved difficult because (...) of her elevated third battery. I ordered the rigging of the great yard be cut and that it be carried to serve as a bridge. (Note: il s'engagea un vif combat de mousqueterie [...]; notre feu devint tellement supérieur qu'en moins de quinze minutes, nous fîmes taire celui du Victory; [...] ses gaillards furent jonchés de morts et de blessés, et l'amiral Nelson fut tué par le feu de notre mousqueterie. Presqu'aussitôt, les gaillards du vaisseau ennemi furent évacués et le Victory cessa absolument de nous combattre; mais il était difficile de passer à son bord à cause [...] de la supériorité de l'élévation de sa troisième batterie. J'ordonnai de couper les suspentes de la grande vergue et de l'amener pour nous servir de pont. Précis des événemens Particuliers survenus à chaque vaisseau français, dans le combat du 29 vendémiaire an 14, Report of Captain Lucas, commanding the ship Redoutable, to Navy Minister Decrès, written at Reading in England, 2 January 1806.)

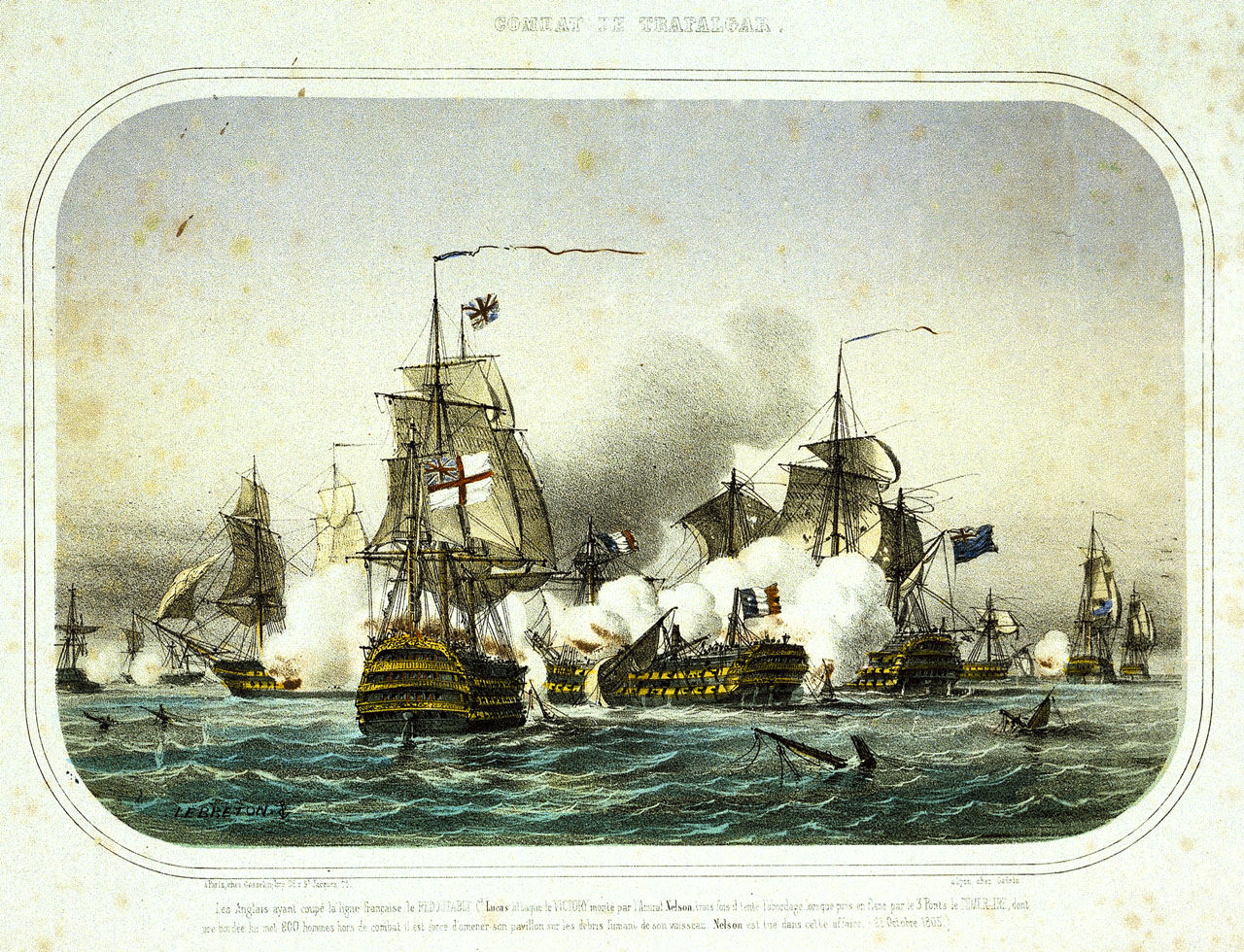
Redoutable during the late stages of the battle, dismasted and attacked by two larger ships.

The French crew were about to board Victory when HMS Temeraire managed to come to the rescue of the stricken flagship, firing on the exposed French crew at point blank range, killing or wounding 200 men, including Lucas and Dupotet, struck by a bullet to the knee, who nevertheless remained at their stations. The crew of Redoutable rushed to man her artillery and engage Temeraire with her starboard battery, Soon, HMS Tonnant took a position at stern of Redoutable, which thus found herself fired upon from three larger ships. In the ensuing cannonade, Redoutable lost most of her artillery, including two guns that burst, killing several gunners. Temeraire hailed for Redoutable to surrender, but Lucas had volley of musketry fired for replies.

At 1:55 pm, Redoutable, with Lucas severely wounded, and only 99 men still fit out of 643 (300 dead and 222 severely wounded), was essentially defenceless. The Fougueux attempted to come to her aid but came afoul of Temeraire. After ascertaining that Redoutable was too damaged to survive the aftermath of the battle, and worried that she would sink before his wounded could be evacuated, Lucas struck his colours at 2:30. Redoutable's aft featured a large opening and was in danger of collapsing, her rudder was shot off, and the hull was pierced in many spots.

Being much damaged and weakened by the fight themselves, the British ships took some time to take possession of Redoutable, and Lucas had to request urgent assistance to pump water, as four of Redoutable's pumps were destroyed and few of her crewmen could man them. (Note: Guérin (vol.6, p.431-432) claims that Lucas threatened to set fire to Redoutable if the British did not come to his aid on the spot, which would have destroyed Victory, Temeraire and probably also Fougueux, all entangled together.)

Redoutable was freed from the rigging of Temeraire around 7 in the evening and was taken in tow by HMS Swiftsure. The next day, Redoutable made distress signals, and Swiftsure launched boats to evacuate her passengers; she foundered around 7, taking 196 men with her. Lucas reported:

On the 30th, at 5pm, she was forced to ask for assistance; there was only time to save the captain and the men who were not wounded, as at 7pm, her stern collapsed and she foundered. 50 wounded were saved as they clung to floating debris from the ship. (Note: le 30, à 5 h du soir, il fut obligé de demander du secours; on n'a eu que le tems de sauver le capitaine; les hommes qui n'étoient pas Blessés, car à 7 h, la poupe s'étant écroulée il coula Bas. On a sauvé 50 Blessés qui étoient restés à flot sur les débris du vaisseau.)
Lucas' report dates the sinking to 30 vendémiaire An XIV of the French Republican Calendar, which amounts to 22 October 1805.

Victory had sustained 160 casualties, and Temeraire 120. Of Redoutable's crew, 169 were taken on board Swiftsure; the wounded were sent to Cadiz on a cartel, and 35 men were taken prisoner to England.

Lucas was received in England with great courtesy. After his release from capture, he was personally awarded the rank of Commandeur of the Legion of Honour by Napoleon for his role during the battle.
