= John Maitland (Royal Navy officer) =

Rear-Admiral John Maitland
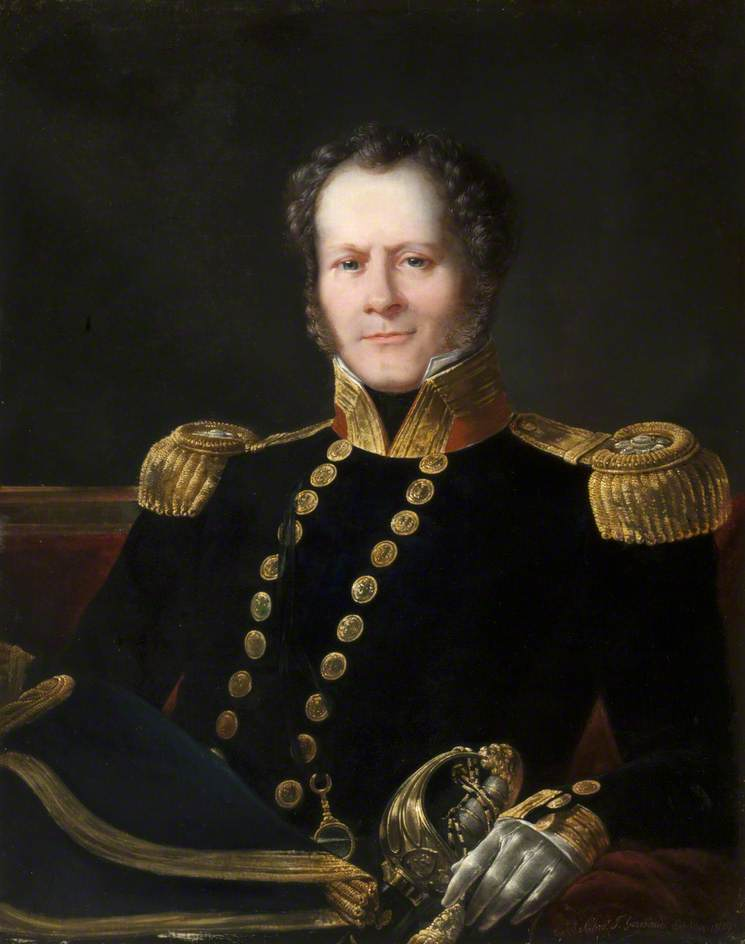
- John Maitland by J. Gaubaud
- Born: 1771; Scotland
- Died: 20 October 1836 (aged 64–65); Montagu Square, London
- Relatives: Richard Maitland (father); Charles Maitland (grandfather); Frederick Lewis Maitland (uncle); Frederick Lewis Maitland (first cousin)
- Military career
- Allegiance: United Kingdom of Great Britain and Ireland
- Branch: Royal Navy
- Service years: – 1836
- Rank: Rear-Admiral
- Commands: HMS Lively; HMS Transfer; HMS Kingfisher; HMS Glenmore; HMS Boadicea; HMS Barfleur

John Maitland (1771 – 20 October 1836) was an officer of the Royal Navy, who saw service during the French Revolutionary and Napoleonic Wars, eventually rising to the rank of Rear-Admiral.

== Family and early life ==
Maitland was born in Scotland in 1771, the third son of Colonel the Honourable Richard Maitland, who was himself the fourth son of Charles Maitland, 6th Earl of Lauderdale. His mother was Mary Maitland, née McAdam, of New York City. John Maitland was born into a substantial naval dynasty. His uncle was Frederick Lewis Maitland, who was a captain in the navy, and his first cousin was Frederick Lewis Maitland, who reached the rank of rear-admiral. John Maitland also entered the navy, and by 1793 was a midshipman aboard John Jervis's flagship HMS Boyne. Maitland was involved in the attacks on the French colonies of Guadeloupe and Martinique, often serving on shore with landing parties. In the assault on Fort Fleur d'Épée he was the first person over the walls, and came to the rescue of Captain Robert Faulknor when Faulknor was attacked by two Frenchmen. Maitland ran one through with a pike and went on to kill another seven or eight of the garrison. During the attack on Pointe-à-Pitre, Guadeloupe, Maitland took over command of the landing parties as an acting-lieutenant when all of the more senior officers had been killed or incapacitated by wounds or exhaustion.

== Command ==
=== Lively and Kingfisher: "Doctor Maitland's Recipe" ===
He received his commission as a lieutenant on 20 July 1794, and returned to serve in home waters, initially aboard the 32-gun frigate HMS Winchelsea, under Lord Garlies. Maitland then followed Garlies into the 32-gun frigate HMS Lively, soon becoming her acting commander and sailing her to join Jervis's Mediterranean Fleet. He continued to serve with considerable gallantry, capturing the French frigate Touterelle in 1795. An impressed Jervis promoted him to commander on 23 December 1796, appointing him to the sloop HMS Transfer. Maitland was moved to HMS Kingfisher in April 1797, and took her to cruise off Portugal on 1 August, though he was almost the victim of a mutiny. Taking a direct approach, he gathered his officers and marines and attacked the mutineers with swords and cutlasses, killing and wounding several. This decisive action quashed the mutiny, and met with Jervis's approval. He described Maitland's actions as 'Doctor Maitland's recipe', and advised that it should be adopted in future instances of attempted mutiny. A further promotion for Maitland followed, he was made post-captain on 11 August 1797 and was given command of HMS San Nicolas, one of the prizes captured by Nelson at the Battle of Cape St Vincent.

=== Channel duties ===
Maitland sailed the San Nicolas to Britain, where she was paid off at Plymouth on her arrival, and Maitland went ashore. He married Elizabeth Ogilvy on 22 April 1799, and by 1800 had returned to active service aboard the 36-gun HMS Glenmore in the English Channel. He moved to the 38-gun HMS Boadicea in 1803, and on 24 July 1803 he spotted the French 74-gun third-rate Duguay-Trouin and the 38-gun frigate Guerrière sailing off Ferrol, Spain. Maitland decided to test whether the French ships were armed en flûte and were being used as troopships, and closing to within range, opened fire. The French returned fire, revealing they were fully armed and manned, and Maitland broke off. The French pursued, but were unable to catch him. Maitland continued on in the Channel, but while sailing off Brest the Boadicea struck the Bas de Lis rock and was badly holed. She returned to Portsmouth and was back on station eight days later, having spent just three days in dock. He went on to have a successful cruise, capturing the 12-gun French Vanteur, and several merchants. Maitland and the Boadicea spent 1804 enforcing the blockade of Rochefort, followed by a period in the North Sea and off the Irish coast.

On 2 November he came across a squadron of four French ships of the line under Pierre Dumanoir le Pelley, that had escaped from the Battle of Trafalgar two weeks previously. Maitland fired rockets to attract a nearby British squadron under Captain Sir Richard Strachan, but subsequently lost the French in fog. Strachan was able to make contact with the French thanks to Maitland, and after engaging them in the Battle of Cape Ortegal, captured all of the French ships. A few days later Maitland spotted and gave chase to a French frigate, eventually breaking off after two days pursuit due to the nearness of the coast. He later learnt that the French frigate had run onto the island of Groix. In the autumn of 1806 Boadicea was employed protecting the whale fishery in the Davis Strait. He escorted a convoy to Britain from Porto, and followed this with service on the Irish station in 1807, blockading Le Havre. During this time the 14-gun French privateer General Concleux was captured, and Maitland left the Boadicea in 1808. He was appointed to the 98-gun HMS Barfleur in late 1813, spending the rest of the war aboard her in the Mediterranean.

== Flag rank and later life ==
Maitland married for the second time at Bath on 8 January 1820, this time to Dora Bateman. He was promoted to rear-admiral on 19 July 1821 and died at Montagu Square, London on 20 October 1836 at the age of 65.
