= French frigate Bravoure =

History

France
- Name: Bravoure
- Builder: Saint Servan
- Laid down: October 1793
- Launched: November 1795
- Completed: November 1796
- Fate: Wrecked 10 September 1801

General characteristics
- Class & type: Cocarde-class frigate
- Type: frigate
- Displacement: 1190 tonneaux
- Tons burthen: 590 port tonneaux
- Length: 144 ft 3 in (43.97 m) (overall); 119 ft 8 1/2 in (36.487 m) (keel)
- Beam: 37 ft 6 in (11.43 m)
- Depth of hold: 11 ft 8 in (3.56 m)
- Complement: 308
- Armament: 40 guns: 28 × 12-pounder long guns; 12 × 6-pounder long guns
- Armour: Timber

Bravoure ("Bravery") was a 40-gun Cocarde-class frigate of the French Navy.

She was launched in November 1795 in Saint Servan. She took part in the Expédition d'Irlande, and later served in Ganteaume's squadron. On 28 January 1801, she fought an indecisive battle against HMS Concorde. In June of the same year, under commander Dordelin, she ferried artillery pieces from Toulon to Elba with Succès; on the way back, she encountered HMS Concorde again in the Tyrrhenian Sea on 10 September 1801, but this time Concorde was accompanied by two other frigates. To avoid capture, she beached herself off Elba and became a total loss.
