= Cocarde-class frigate =

Class of frigates of the French Navy

Class overview
- Name: Cocarde
- Operators: French Navy; Royal Navy
- Completed: 3

General characteristics
- Type: frigate
- Tons burthen: 895 20/94(bm)
- Length: 144 ft 3 in (43.97 m) (overall); 119 ft 8 1/2 in (36.487 m) (keel)
- Beam: 37 ft 6 in (11.43 m)
- Depth of hold: 11 ft 8 in (3.56 m)
- Crew: 200
- Armament: 40 guns: 28 × 12-pounder long guns; 12 × 6-pounder long guns

The Cocarde class was a class of three 40-gun/12-pounder frigates of the French Navy. They were designed by Pierre Duhamel in 1793.

- Cocarde Nationale

Builder: St Malo
Ordered: 16 May 1793
Laid down: August 1793
Launched: 29 April 1794
Completed: July 1794
Fate: Deleted 14 June 1803

- Régénérée

Builder: St Malo
Ordered: 16 May 1793
Laid down: September 1793
Launched: 1 November 1794
Completed: April 1795
Fate: captured by British Navy 27 September 1801 at Alexandria, becoming HMS Alexandria.

- Bravoure

Builder: St Servan
Ordered:
Laid down: October 1793
Launched: November 1795
Completed: November 1796
Fate: run ashore near Leghorn to avoid capture 1 September 1801.

== Bibliography ==
- Winfield, Rif and Roberts, Stephen S. (2015) French Warships in the Age of Sail 1786-1861: Design, Construction, Careers and Fates. Seaforth Publishing. ISBN 978-1-84832-204-2.
