= French ship Fougueux (1785) =

Ship of the line of the French Navy

- Scale model of Achille, sister ship of French ship Fougueux (1785), on display at the Musée national de la Marine in Paris.

History

France
- Name: Fougueux
- Namesake: "Impetuous"
- Builder: Lorient shipyard
- Laid down: 1784
- Launched: 19 September 1785
- Fate: Wrecked, 22 October 1805

General characteristics
- Displacement: 3,069 tonneaux
- Tons burthen: 1,537 port tonneaux
- Length: 55.87 m (183 ft 4 in)
- Beam: 14.46 m (47 ft 5 in)
- Draught: 7.15 m (23.5 ft)
- Depth of hold: 7.15 m (23 ft 5 in)
- Sail plan: Full-rigged ship
- Crew: 705
- Armament: 74 guns: Lower gun deck: 28 × 36-pounder long guns; Upper gun deck: 30 × 18-pounder long guns; Forecastle and Quarterdeck: 12 × 8-pounder long guns, 10 × 36-pounder carronades

Fougueux was a 74-gun Téméraire-class ship of the line built for the French Navy during the 1780s. Completed in 1785, she was captured during the Battle of Trafalgar, but was wrecked in a storm the following day.

== Description ==
The Téméraire-class ships had a length of 55.87 metres (183 ft 4 in), a beam of 14.46 metres (47 ft 5 in) and a depth of hold of 7.15 metres (23 ft 5 in). The ships displaced 3,069 tonneaux and had a mean draught of 7.15 metres (23 ft 5 in). They had a tonnage of 1,537 port tonneaux. Their crew numbered 705 officers and ratings during wartime. They were fitted with three masts and ship rigged.

The muzzle-loading, smoothbore armament of the Téméraire class consisted of twenty-eight 36-pounder long guns on the lower gun deck, thirty 18-pounder long guns and thirty 18-pounder long guns on the upper gun deck. On the quarterdeck and forecastle were a total of a dozen 8-pounder long guns and ten 36-pounder carronades.

== Construction and career ==
Fougeaux was ordered on 1 June 1782 and the ship was named on 21 August. She was laid down at the Arsenal de Lorient in November, although construction was stopped on 1 November 1783. Her components were put in storage; construction resumed in November 1784 and Fougeaux was launched on 19 September 1785. She was completed in December 1785.

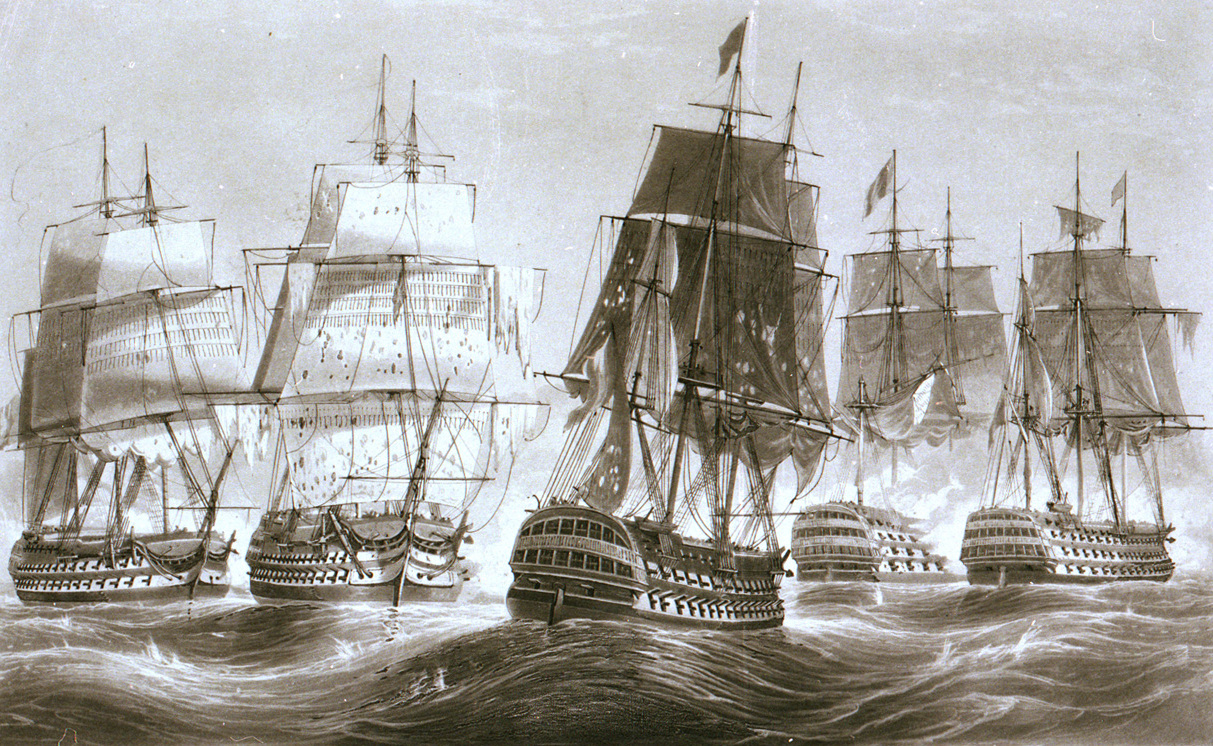
Fougueux (far left) at Trafalgar, by Edward Duncan after William John Huggins

She took part in the Battle of Trafalgar, firing the first shot of the battle upon HMS Royal Sovereign. She later attempted to come to the aid of the Redoutable by engaging HMS Temeraire. After badly damaging Fougueux with broadsides, Temeraire's first-lieutenant, Thomas Fortescue Kennedy, led a boarding party onto Fougueux, entering the French ship via her main deck ports and chains. The French tried to defend the decks, but were steadily overwhelmed. Fougueux's captain, Louis Alexis Baudoin, had suffered a fatal wound earlier in the fighting, leaving Commander François Bazin in charge. On learning that nearly all of the officers were dead or wounded and that most of the guns were out of action, Bazin surrendered the ship to Kennedy.

On the day after the battle a severe storm battered the surviving ships. Fougueux was driven ashore near Torre Bermeja on the coast of Spain and was wrecked. Only 25 men aboard, British prize crew and French prisoners, survived.
