= French ship Génois (1805) =

Ship of the line of the French Navy

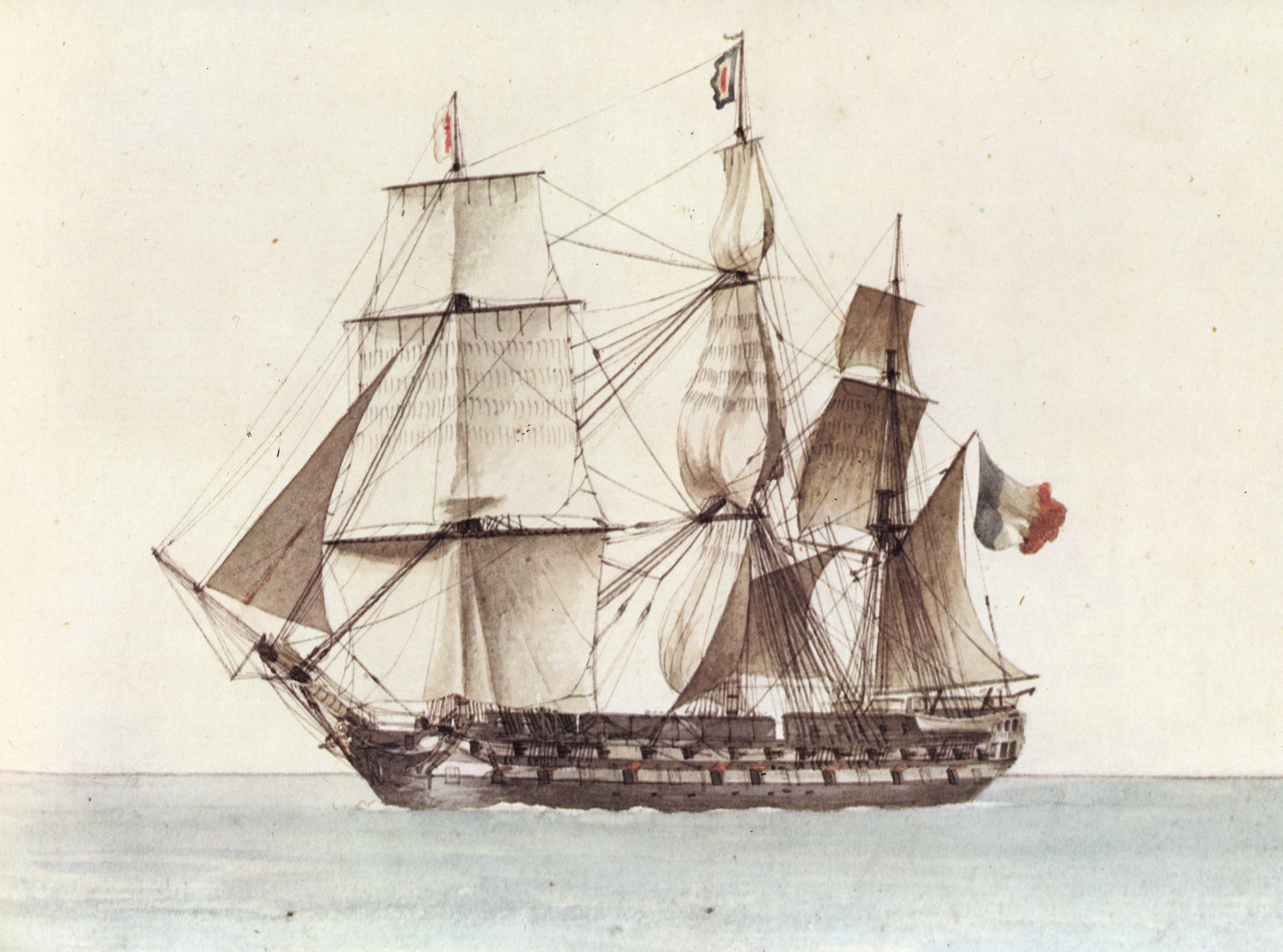
- Borée, Génois's sister ship

History

France
- Name: Génois
- Namesake: Genoa (demonym)
- Ordered: 8 July 1803
- Builder: Muzzio and Migone, Genoa
- Launched: 16 August 1805
- Commissioned: 1 November 1805
- Stricken: 1821
- Fate: Broken up in 1821

General characteristics
- Class & type: petit Téméraire-class ship of the line
- Displacement: 2,781 tonneaux
- Tons burthen: 1,381 port tonneaux
- Length: 53.97 m (177 ft 1 in)
- Beam: 14.29 m (46 ft 11 in)
- Draught: 6.72 m (22.0 ft)
- Depth of hold: 6.9 m (22 ft 8 in)
- Sail plan: Full-rigged ship
- Crew: 705
- Armament: 74 guns: Lower gun deck: 28 × 36 pdr guns; Upper gun deck: 30 × 18 pdr guns; Forecastle and Quarterdeck: 20–26 × 8 pdr guns & 36 pdr carronades

Génois was a 74-gun petite Téméraire-class ship of the line built for the French Navy during the first decade of the 19th century. Completed in 1805, she played a minor role in the Napoleonic Wars.

== Background and description ==
Génois was one of the petit modèle of the Téméraire class that was specially intended for construction in some of the shipyards in countries occupied by the French, where there was less depth of water than in the main French shipyards. The ships had a length of 53.97 metres (177 ft 1 in), a beam of 14.29 metres (46 ft 11 in) and a depth of hold of 6.9 metres (22 ft 8 in). The ships displaced 2,781 tonneaux and had a mean draught of 6.72 metres (22 ft 1 in). They had a tonnage of 1,381 port tonneaux. Their crew numbered 705 officers and ratings during wartime. They were fitted with three masts and ship rigged.

The muzzle-loading, smoothbore armament of the Téméraire class consisted of twenty-eight 36-pounder long guns on the lower gun deck and thirty 18-pounder long guns on the upper gun deck. The petit modèle ships ordered in 1803–1804 were intended to mount sixteen 8-pounder long guns on their forecastle and quarterdeck, plus four 36-pounder obusiers on the poop deck (dunette). Later ships were intended to have fourteen 8-pounders and ten 36-pounder carronades without any obusiers, but the numbers of 8 pounders and carronades actually varied between a total of 20 to 26 weapons.

== Construction and career ==
Génois was ordered on 8 July 1803 and named on 24 April. The ship was laid down on 17 August 1803 by Muzzio and Migone at their shipyard in Genoa, Italy. The first attempt to launched was botched on 6 August 1805; the ship stopped dead on her launching berth, and her keel hogged. Engineer Forfait was sent to Genoa to save the ship and managed to launch her properly on 16 August. She was commissioned on 2 November by Captain Pierre Lhermite and completed later that month. In early 1808, Génois took part in expeditions to supply Corfu. Lhermite was replaced by Captain Montalan in April 1809, who retained command until Génois was disarmed on 23 June 1814. She was struck and broken up in 1821 in Toulon.

== Bibliography ==
- Levot, Prosper (1866). Les gloires maritimes de la France: notices biographiques sur les plus célèbres marins (in French). Bertrand.
- Quintin, Danielle; Quintin, Bernard (2003). Dictionnaire des capitaines de Vaisseau de Napoléon (in French). S.P.M. ISBN 2-901952-42-9.
- Roche, Jean-Michel (2005). Dictionnaire des bâtiments de la flotte de guerre française de Colbert à nos jours [Dictionary of French Warships from Colbert to Today]. Vol. 1: 1671-1870. Roche. ISBN 978-2-9525917-0-6. OCLC 165892922.
- Winfield, Rif and Roberts, Stephen S. (2015) French Warships in the Age of Sail 1786-1861: Design, Construction, Careers and Fates. Seaforth Publishing. ISBN 978-1-84832-204-2
