= HMS Kingfisher (1782) =

Royal Navy ship

History

Great Britain
- Name: HMS Kingfisher
- Builder: Unknown (Possibly Greaves & Nicholson), Rochester
- Launched: 1782
- Acquired: 1782
- Fate: Wrecked on 3 December 1798

General characteristics
- Type: 18-gun sloop
- Tons burthen: 36957/94 (bm)
- Length: 95 ft 1 in (28.98 m) (gundeck); 75 ft 3.5 in (22.949 m) (keel)
- Beam: 30 ft 9 in (9.37 m)
- Depth of hold: 7 ft 6.25 in (2.2924 m)
- Complement: 120
- Armament: 18 × short 6-pounder guns

HMS Kingfisher was an 18-gun sloop of the Royal Navy which saw service during the American War of Independence and the French Revolutionary Wars.

== Career ==
Kingfisher was one of a number of small sloops and brigs purchased on the stocks while under construction during the American War of Independence. Though built at Rochester on the River Medway, It is uncertain which yard Kingfisher was purchased from. Greaves & Nicholson is one possibility. Her name is often given as King’s Fisher. Kingfisher was fitted at Chatham Dockyard, and commissioned for service in May 1783 under Commander William Albany Otway.

Commander George Lumsdaine took over in November 1786, and was in turned superseded by Commander Henry Warre in April 1788. Kingfisher went on to serve under a succession of commanders during the last years of peace and the early years of the French Revolutionary War. Commander Charles Jones was captain from May 1791, succeeded by Commander William Brown in June 1792, and Brown in turn by Commander Thomas Graves in November that year. From April 1794 she was under Commander Thomas Le Marchant Gosselin, though he was replaced by Commander Alexander Wilson in August 1795. Wilson's command was short-lived, in September Kingfisher was under Commander Edward Marsh, who took her out to the West Indies in March 1796, and then to the Lisbon station in January 1797. Marsh was soon superseded by Commander John Bligh, who had distinguished himself at the Battle of Cape St Vincent on 14 February 1797, and been rewarded with a promotion to commander on 8 March 1797 and the command of Kingfisher. While cruising off Porto he was able to capture the 14-gun French privateer Général on 29 March.

In April 1797 Commander John Maitland took command. On 1 August he was almost the victim of a mutiny. Taking a direct approach he gathered his officers and marines and attacked the mutineers with swords and cutlasses, killing and wounding several. This decisive action quashed the mutiny, and was approved of by his commanding officer, Admiral John Jervis. Jervis described Maitland's actions as 'Doctor Maitland's recipe', and advised that it should be adopted in future instances of attempted mutiny. Maitland was promoted to post-captain on 11 August 1797 and was given command of HMS San Nicolas, one of the prizes captured by Nelson at the Battle of Cape St Vincent. Before his transfer he had time to repeat Kingfisher's success against privateers, capturing the 2-gun privateer Espoir on 15 September that year. Maitland was replaced by Commander Charles Pierrepoint, who had even more success. The 16-gun privateer Betsey was captured on 8 January 1798, followed by the 10-gun privateer Lynx on 15 March 1798. Also serving aboard Kingfisher at this time was Lieutenant Frederick Lewis Maitland. Maitland had gained a reputation for courage, so much so that the ship's company subscribed £50 to present him with a sword.

Disaster struck when Kingfisher was bilged on the Portuguese coast after running onto the Lisbon Bar while leaving the Tagus on 3 December 1798, and was lost. Maitland had been temporarily in command at the time, and faced a court-martial, which honourably acquitted him.
