= HMS Cordelia (1808) =

Brig-sloop of the Royal Navy

HMS Cordelia was a Cherokee-class brig-sloop completed by the British Royal Navy in 1808. She served in home waters during the Napoleonic War, and subsequently in the Mediterranean and the West Indies.

== Design and construction ==
Cordelia was a Cherokee Class brig-rigged Sloop-of-War of 237 tons. She was 90 feet 2 inches long on her main deck and had a beam of 24 ft 7 in, her draft was 9 ft at the rudder. Her armament comprised eight 18-pounder carronades on her broadside with two 6-pounder long guns in her bows. She also carried a dozen half-pounder swivel guns attached to her upper deck bulwarks and in her fighting tops. She had a complement of 52.

Her keel was laid down in May 1808 under Navy Board contract by John King at his shipyard in Upnor and launched on 26 July 1808. She was then fitted out at Royal Dockyard Chatham and commissioned with Thomas Fortescue Kennedy as her Master and Commander. She was declared complete on the 17 November 1808.

== Service ==
On exerting service, Cordelia was assigned to the North Sea fleet under Rear-Admiral Sir Richard Strachan. Operating out of Deal, she patrolled the Dutch coast and in July 1809 was one of the 264 warships and 352 transports carrying 44,000 troops, that attacked the island of Walcheren in the ill-fated campaign to deny French fleet access to the ports of Flushing and Antwerp on the Scheldt.

Subsequently, Cordelia's principal role was to pursue French privateers and protect merchant shipping between English North Sea ports and along the south coast, including as far as Cork.

From July to September 1816, Cordelia was attached to the fleet involved in the Bombardment of Algiers. She then resumed her anti-privateer patrols in home waters. In April 1820 she returned to Chatham for a refit but was then laid up in the Chatham Ordinary until November 1828.

Having been recommissioned, Cordelia recommenced her role with the home fleet, but was diverted to Oporto in April 1828 to protect British trade "for as long as any peril should exist" as the port was being blockaded by a Miguelito squadron at the beginning of the Liberal Wars of succession to the Portuguese throne.

Cordelia was then assigned to the Mediterranean Fleet, patrolling between Gibraltar and Smyrna, but by February 1830 she had been recalled to Sheerness to be paid off again. On 5 January 1831 she left Sheerness for the Royal Navy's Bermuda station, where she spent twelve months patrolling the West Indies and the eastern seaboard of the United States searching for pirates and slavers.

She served her final two years as a commissioned ship patrolling the Agean and the Levant searching for pirates and escorting convoys. Her captain, Charles Hotham, was presented with a "splendid sword" by the Grand Seignor for his services.

== Disposal ==
In October 1833, whilst based in the Ionian Islands, Cordelia was ordered home and paid off at Chatham, subsequently being sold for £400.
