= John Northall =

Former officer of the British Army

Captain John Northall
- Born: c. 1723
- Died: 1759; India
- Military career
- Allegiance: Kingdom of Great Britain; East India Company
- Branch: British Army
- Service years: 1741–1759
- Rank: Captain
- Unit: Royal Artillery

Captain John Northall (c. 1723–1759) was an officer of the British Army and a writer.

== Biography ==
Northall entered the service as a gentleman-cadet in the Royal Regiment of Artillery on 1 July 1741, and was promoted to the rank of lieutenant fireworker on 1 April 1742. He served under Colonel Thomas Pattison with the Royal Artillery in Flanders in 1742, and was promoted to second lieutenant on 1 April 1744. He was present at the battle of Fontenoy on 11 May 1745, and became first lieutenant on 3 October 1745, captain-lieutenant on 24 March 1752, and captain on 1 October 1755.

In February 1752 Northall went to Minorca, and thence embarked for Livorno (at that time called "Leghorn" in English). Instead of making the usual tour of Italy, he first visited the principal cities of Tuscany, and, after a cursory visit to Rome, went to Naples. Then, after a more lengthened stay in Rome, he went to Loretto, Bologna, Venice, Mantua, Parma, and Modena, and returned to Leghorn, whence he sailed for Genoa. From Genoa he went by sea to Villefranche-sur-Mer (Villafranca), and on by land to Marseille. In 1755 he and Richard Maitland were among the Royal Artillery officers who were sent as commanders of companies to India. In February 1759, he served under Maitland in the capture of Surat. He died later that year.

== Works ==
A posthumous account of his Italian tour was published in July 1766, entitled Travels through Italy; containing new and curious Observations on that Country. … With the most authentic Account yet published of capital Pieces in Painting, Sculpture, and Architecture that are to be seen in Italy, &c., making up eight volumes. This work has been criticised as closely following the previous travels of J. G. Keysler.
