= Spanish ship San Leandro =

San Leandro includes the following ships of the Spanish Navy:

- San Leandro, a San Joaquín-class ship of the line, sold 1784
- San Leandro, a 64-gun ship of the line launched in 1787, wrecked in 1814

== See also ==
- List of ships of the line of Spain
