= French frigate Cocarde =

History

France
- Name: Cocarde
- Ordered: 16 May 1793
- Builder: Saint Malo
- Laid down: August 1793
- Launched: 29 April 1794
- Completed: July 1794
- Fate: Broken up 1803

General characteristics
- Class & type: Cocarde-class frigate
- Type: frigate
- Displacement: 1190 tonneaux
- Tons burthen: 590 port tonneaux
- Length: 144 ft 3 in (43.97 m) (overall); 119 ft 8 1/2 in (36.487 m) (keel)
- Beam: 37 ft 6 in (11.43 m)
- Depth of hold: 11 ft 8 in (3.56 m)
- Crew: 200
- Armament: 40 guns: 28 × 12-pounder long guns; 12 × 6-pounder long guns
- Armour: Timber

Cocarde was a 40-gun Cocarde-class frigate of the French Navy.

Commissioned as Cocarde nationale, she was launched on 29 April 1794 in Saint Malo and commissioned in July under Lieutenant Allanic. Under Captain Quérangal, she took part in the Battle of Groix. She later took part in the Expédition d'Irlande. She was renamed Cocarde in June 1796.

During the Quasi War on 10 July 1799, under command of Citizen Croiset, she captured the American armed merchant ship Rufus 4 leagues (19 km) east southeast of Cadiz, Spain.

In 1802, she served in the Caribbean. A series of beachings damaged her sails and hull to the point where she was condemned and broken up in 1803.
