= Richard Maitland (British Army officer) =

British Army Royal Artillery officer (1714–1763)

Major Richard Maitland
- Born: c. 1714
- Died: February 21, 1763; Bombay, India
- Burial place: Bombay, India
- Military career
- Allegiance: Kingdom of Great Britain; East India Company
- Branch: British Army
- Service years: 1732–1763
- Rank: Major
- Unit: Royal Artillery

Major Richard Maitland (c. 1714 – 21 February 1763) was a British Army officer who served in the Royal Artillery, and the captor of Surat while in the service of the East India Company.

== Early career ==
Maitland was born in around 1714. He enlisted in the Royal Artillery as a matross on 1 November 1732, at about 18. He rose by merit through the enlisted and non-commissioned officer grades, and received a commission as lieutenant-fireworker in 1742. The dates of his subsequent commissions show that his promotion was at first uncommonly rapid: he was a second lieutenant on 1 May 1743, a first lieutenant on 1 April 1744, a captain-lieutenant on 1 August 1747, and a captain on 1 March 1755. Maitland fought at the battle of Fontenoy in 1745, and likely in some of the less successful battles of the War of the Austrian Succession during the following two years.

== Indian service ==
In 1755, four companies of the Royal Artillery, one of which Maitland commanded, were specially formed for Indian service under the East India Company. They embarked for India in that year; one was totally lost on the voyage out, but the other three arrived safely at Bombay, where they joined the garrison. Maitland participated in the capture of Gheriah, a stronghold of Maratha Empire pirates, in February 1756, on which occasion the land forces were commanded by Lieutenant-Colonel Robert Clive.

On 20 February 1759, Maitland's company, sailed from Bombay with the objective of capturing the town and castle of Surat, then held by Sidi Masud. As the seniormost officer in the expeditionary force, Maitland was entrusted with its command by the authorities at Bombay (making him the first Royal Artillery officer to command a mixed expeditionary force). The land force comprised Maitland's and John Northall's artillery companies, and a large detachment of the Bombay European Regiment, altogether 850 European soldiers and 1,500 Sepoys. The naval part of the expedition, under Commodore Watson, consisted of five of the East India Company's warships and a large number of vessels to carry the troops and stores. The soldiers were paid by the merchants of Surat, in exchange for not looting the city. After a slow passage along the coast, the troops landed on 26 February at Dumas, nine miles (14 km) from Surat. On 20 February, a new camp was established at Umra, a village on a river bank near the city, and Maitland began besieging the castle. On 28 February, the enemy were driven from a position at the French Gardens after a smart action that lasted four hours, in which Maitland lost about twenty killed and as many wounded. On 1 March some of the troops were landed at the Bunder (customs wharf), covered by the fire of the shipping, and after some fighting the town surrendered. A battery for two guns and a mortar had been completed, and after three days' firing from this and the wharfs, a "general attack" was made, and on 4 March the castle capitulated. The details of the loss of the besiegers have been variously stated, but probably amounted to 130, including four officers, killed, and near a hundred wounded on the part of the land forces, while "the marine" lost about 150. Maitland evinced throughout the excellent command abilities, and expert use of artillery.

Maitland remained at Surat to repair the defences until April, when he landed at Bombay to a salute of thirteen guns. He received the thanks of the East India Company, to whom the acquisition of Surat brought an increase of revenue of about 50,000 pounds per annum. He was promoted to the rank of major on 10 March 1762, and he died at Bombay on 21 February 1763. He was buried the same day.

Maitland's company is now 5 (Gibraltar 1779–1783) Battery of The Scottish Gunners.
