= Louis Alexis Baudoin =

Louis Alexis Baudoin (French pronunciation: [lwi alɛksi bodwɛ̃]; Saint-Jean-d'Angély, 2 December 1776 — Fougueux, off Trafalgar, 21 October 1805) was a French Navy officer and captain.

== Career ==
After sailing on merchantmen, Baudouin joined the Navy as a temporary Lieutenant and embarked on Tourville on 7 June 1793. Promoted to full Lieutenant on 20 March 1794, he served on the frigate Thétis, of which he took command in 1796.

In 1798, he was appointed to Vénus and took part in the Expédition d'Irlande. In 1799, he served on the frigate Concorde under Jean-François Landolphe, on which he took part in the action of 4 August 1800 and was captured. Returned to France in September 1801, he was appointed on Foudroyant.

Promoted to Commander on 27 October 1802, Baudouin was given command of the frigate Guerrière. He rose to Captain on 24 September 1803 and was awarded the rank of Officier of the Legion of Honour on 30 June 1804, and was appointed to Fougueux, in Villeneuve's fleet, on 1 July 1805. He took part in the Battle of Trafalgar, where he was killed.

== Sources and references ==
=== Bibliography ===
- Quintin, Danielle; Quintin, Bernard (2003). Dictionnaire des capitaines de Vaisseau de Napoléon. S.P.M. ISBN 2-901952-42-9.
- Fonds Marine. Campagnes (opérations; divisions et stations navales; missions diverses). Inventaire de la sous-série Marine BB4. Tome deuxième : BB4 1 à 482 (1790-1826)
- Levot, Prosper (1866). Les gloires maritimes de la France: notices biographiques sur les plus célèbres marins (in French). Bertrand. p. 30.
