= HMS Trusty (1782) =

50-gun fourth-rate ship of the line of the Royal Navy

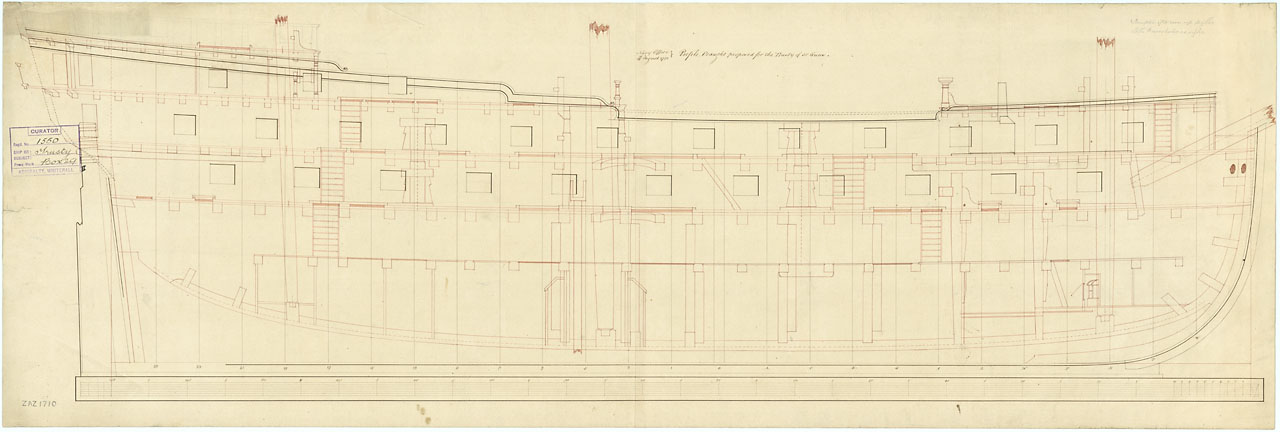
- Plan showing the inboard profile proposed for Trusty, 19 August 1781.

History

Great Britain
- Name: Trusty
- Builder: James Martin Hillhouse, Bristol
- Launched: 9 October 1782
- Reinstated: July 1799 refitted as a 28 gun unrated troopship; April 1809 refitted as an unrated prison ship
- Fate: Broken up, April 1815

General characteristics
- Tons burthen: 1,088 1/16
- Length: Gundeck: 150 ft 5 1/2 in (45.860 m); Keel: 17 ft 9 3/4 in (5.429 m)
- Depth of hold: 17 ft 9 3/4 in (5.429 m)
- Propulsion: Sails
- Sail plan: Full-rigged ship
- Armament: Lower Gundeck: 22 × 24-pounder guns; Upper Gundeck: 22 × 12-pounder guns; QD: 4 × 6-pounder guns; Fc: 2 × 6-pounder guns

HMS Trusty was a 50-gun fourth-rate ship of the line of the Royal Navy.

== Design ==
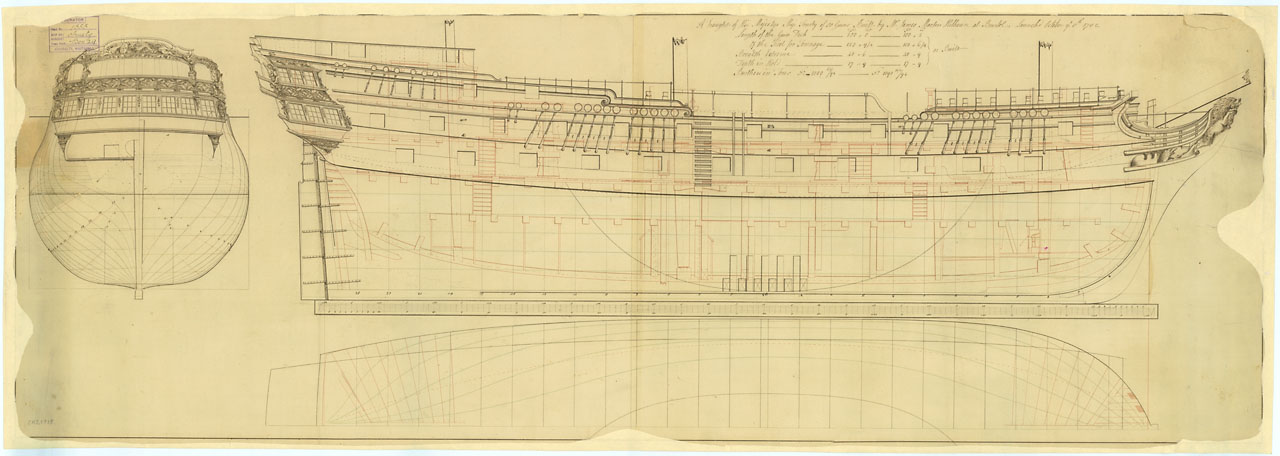
Trusty's as built plan issued March 1782 - March 1784

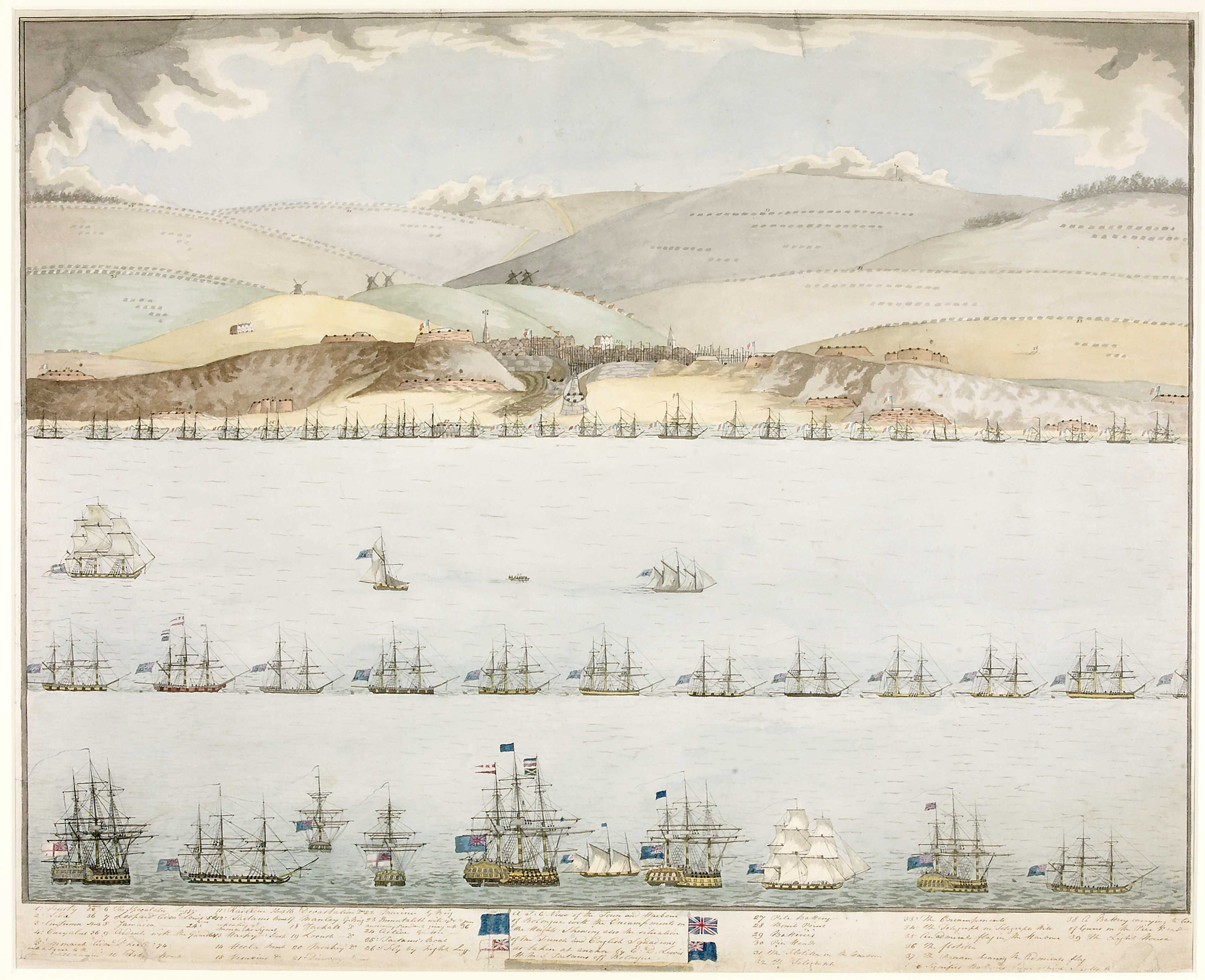
HMS Trusty (top left) fitted as a troopship at the Raid on Boulogne

Designed by Edward Hunt and built at Sheerness Dockyard, the Trusty extended the design of Hunt's earlier ships by 2 ft (0.6 m). Like Cato, she featured the beakhead bulkhead, roundhouse with gallery, and solid bulwarks along the quarterdeck. The large roundhouse was surmounted by further solid bulwarks into which a fourth tier of gunports was cut for the carronades mounted on the poopdeck. The mizzen channels were moved up above the aftmost quarterdeck gunports.

== Service ==
Trusty was launched on 9 October 1782.

Trusty was at Plymouth on 20 January 1795 and so shared in the proceeds of the detention of the Dutch naval vessels, East Indiamen, and other merchant vessels that were in port on the outbreak of war between Britain and the Netherlands.

Trusty was refitted and used as a troopship from July 1799. Because she served in the Navy's Egyptian campaign (8 March – 2 September 1801), her officers and crew qualified for the "Egypt" clasp to the Naval General Service Medal, which the Admiralty issued in 1847 to all surviving claimants.

Trusty was refitted again as a prison ship from April 1809.

== Fate ==
Trusty was broken up in April 1815.
