= Raid on Manila =

1798 raid of the French Revolutionary Wars

- Part of the French Revolutionary Wars
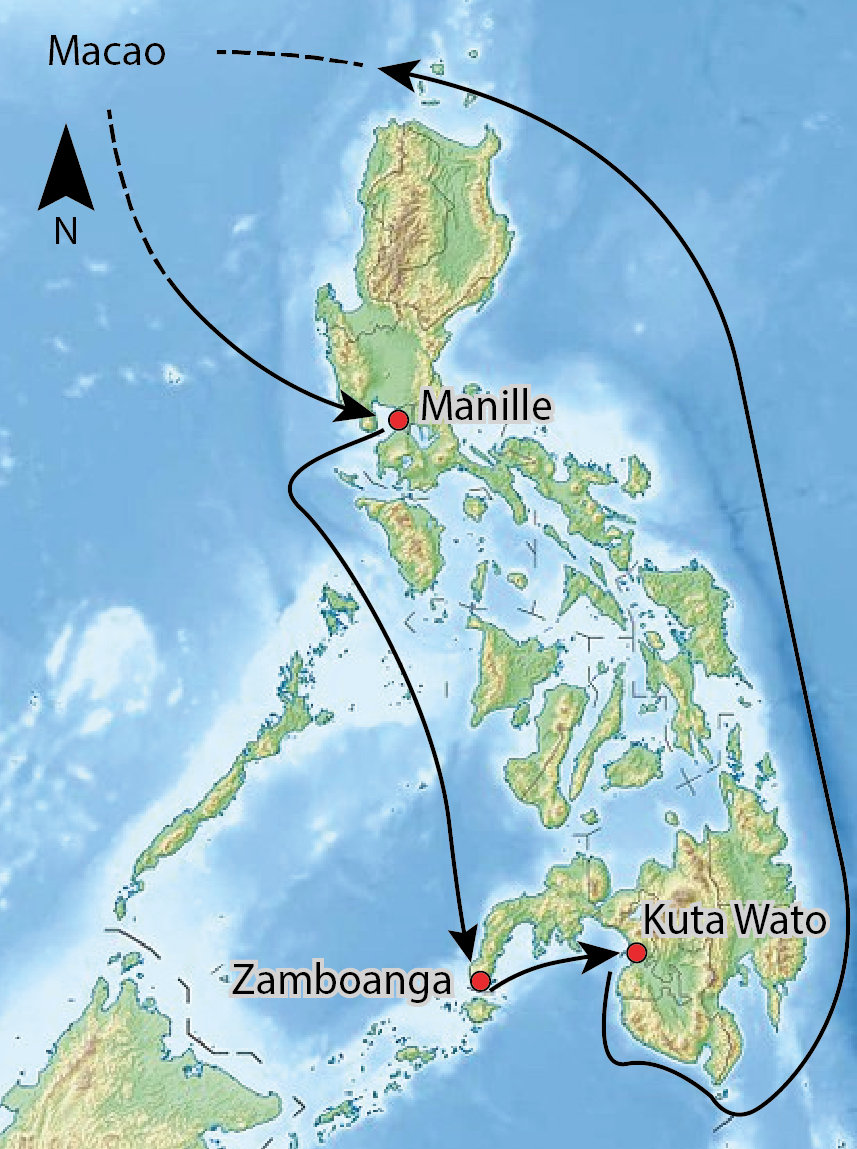
- Journey of Cooke around the Philippines in 1798
Date	January 1798
Location	Manila, Spanish Philippines 14°31′N 120°56′E
Result	See Aftermath

Belligerents
Great Britain	Spain

Commanders and leaders
Edward Cooke	Ignacio María de Álava

Strength
2 frigates	Unknown

Casualties and losses
6 killed 16 wounded	1 killed 4 wounded 3 gunboats captured

The raid on Manila of January 1798 was a Royal Navy false flag military operation during the French Revolutionary Wars intended to scout the strength of the defences of Manila, capital of the Spanish Philippines, capture a Manila galleon and assess the condition of the Spanish Navy squadron maintained in the port. Spain had transformed from an ally of Great Britain in the War of the First Coalition into an enemy in 1796. Thus, the presence of a powerful Spanish squadron at Manila posed a threat to the China Fleet, an annual convoy of East Indiaman merchant ships from Portuguese Macau in Qing China to Britain, which was of vital economic importance to Britain. So severe was this threat that a major invasion of the Spanish Philippines had been planned from British India during 1797, but had been called off following the Treaty of Campo Formio in Europe and the possibility of a major war in India between the British East India Company and the Kingdom of Mysore.

To ensure the safety of the merchant ships gathering at Macau in the winter of 1797–1798, the British commander in the East Indies, Rear-admiral Peter Rainier, sent a convoy to China escorted by the frigates HMS Sybille and HMS Fox and commanded by Captain Edward Cooke. After completing his mission Cooke decided to investigate the state of readiness of Spanish forces in Manila himself. He was also intrigued by reports that a ship carrying treasure was due to sail from Manila, which would make a valuable prize. Sailing in Sybille and accompanied by Captain Pulteney Malcolm in Fox, Cooke reached the Spanish capital on 13 January 1798.

Anchored in Manila Bay, Cooke pretended that his ships were French vessels and successfully lured successive boatloads of Spanish officials aboard, taking them prisoner in turn. Once he had determined from his captives the state of defences in Manila, that the treasure ship had been unloaded at Cavite and that the Spanish squadron was undergoing extensive repairs and thus unavailable for operations, he sent a raiding party against a squadron of gunboats in the mouth of the Pasig River. Capturing the gunboats in a bloodless attack, Cooke then released his prisoners and sailed southwards, unsuccessfully assaulting Zamboanga before returning to Macau.

== Background ==
In 1796, after three years of the French Revolutionary Wars, Spain and the France signed the Treaty of San Ildefonso. The secret terms of this treaty required Spain to renounce its alliance with Great Britain and subsequently to declare war on its former ally. In the East Indies this shift of political allegiance meant that the dominant British forces in the region were faced with the threat of attack from the Spanish Philippines to the east. Britain dominated the East Indies in 1796, controlling the trade routes through the Indian Ocean from the ports of Bombay, Madras and Calcutta. Dutch Ceylon, the Dutch Cape Colony and parts of the Dutch East Indies had been captured in 1795, and the French presence in the region had been confined to Île de France and a few subsidiary islands in the Western Indian Ocean.

Some of the most important trade routes began at Canton and Macau in Qing Dynasty China. Early in each year a large convoy known as the "China Fleet", composed of large East Indiaman merchant ships in the employ of the British East India Company, sailed westwards to Europe from Macau laden with tea and other commercial cargo. This convoy was economically significant to Britain: one convoy in 1804 was valued at over £8 million (the equivalent of £700,000,000 as of 2025). In January 1797 the convoy had been attacked by the French squadron in the East Indies, comprising six frigates commanded by Contre-amiral Pierre César Charles de Sercey. In the ensuing Bali Strait Incident the commander deceived Sercey into believing that the unescorted convoy contained disguised ships of the line and the French admiral retreated, only learning of his error on his return to Île de France. There was considerable concern in India that Sercey might try again in 1798, or that the Spanish, who maintained a powerful squadron at Cavite, might make an attempt of their own.

Rainier's initial impulse on learning in November 1796 of the impending declaration of war between Britain and Spain was to draw up plans for a major invasion of the Philippines, centred on Manila in repetition of the successful British capture of Manila in 1762. Co-operating with the Governor-General of India Sir John Shore and Colonel Arthur Welleley among others, a substantial naval and military forces were earmarked for the operation which was in the advance planning stages, when unexpected news arrived in India in August 1797 announcing the Treaty of Campo Formio which brought the War of the First Coalition to an end. Britain now faced France and Spain alone, while emissaries from the Tipu Sultan of the Kingdom of Mysore, an old opponent of Britain in Southern India, were seeking French assistance with a renewed outbreak of hostilities. The resources planned for the operation against Manila were therefore retained in India and the operation cancelled, but the protection of the China Fleet was still essential and Rainier diverted some of his squadron eastwards to China.

A number of merchant ships had gathered at Bombay in the spring of 1797 in preparation for the trip to Macau to load trade goods and join the China Fleet. To escort this force, Rainier provided the 40-gun frigate HMS Sybille, captured from the French at the Battle of Mykonos in 1794, and the 50-gun HMS Centurion, which sailed with the convoy in July, taking passage through the Straits of Malacca, joined there by the ships of the line HMS Victorious and HMS Trident and the 32-gun frigate HMS Fox under Captain Pulteney Malcolm for the final voyage to Macau. The convoy arrived without incident on 13 December 1797, although the crews had been substantially weakened by tropical illnesses.

== Cooke's raids ==
=== Reconnaissance of Manila ===
With his convoy safely at anchor in Macau and the China Fleet several weeks from sailing, Cooke decided to reconnoitre Manila and make observations on the port and the Spanish squadron based there. As an added motivation, rumours in Macau suggested that the annual Manila galleon was due to arrive. This ship brought up to two million Spanish silver dollars from Acapulco across the Pacific Ocean stopping at Guam on its way to Manila. Depositing its dollars in the Philippines, the ship then loaded trade goods from the East Indies for the return journey to New Spain. This round trip was essential to the maintenance of the Spanish Empire in the East Indies, which operated at an enormous financial loss only mitigated by the substantial subsidy from New Spain. Spanish dollars were the accepted currency across most of the East Indies, and disruption of this financial system could have profound effects on regional trade; but British sailors had nevertheless been attacking the Manila galleons since Thomas Cavendish in 1587.

Leaving the heavier warships at Macau, Cooke sailed on 5 January 1798 only with Sybille and Fox, the latter carrying a Mr. Bernard, an experienced linguist. Passing Luzon, Cooke's ships encountered a small Spanish merchant vessel, which was lured towards the frigates, which were flying French tricolors. Seizing the Spanish vessel, Cooke closely questioned the captain and learned that most of the Spanish squadron in Manila were undergoing extensive repairs at Cavite and were unfit to sail. Cooke rewarded the captain by releasing his vessel with its cargo intact, although he did remove 3,900 silver dollars. The Spanish squadron had suffered badly in a typhoon in April 1797 and much of the damage had still not been repaired by the time Cooke's small squadron arrived off Manila. Cooke had taken precautions to disguise his ships as French vessels, modelling Sybille on the powerful 40-gun Forte and Fox on the smaller Prudente.

=== Dinner on Sybille ===
Late in the afternoon of 13 January 1798, Sybille and Fox arrived in Manila Bay, slipping unchallenged past the fortress of Corregidor and then sailing across the bay on the morning of 14 January, anchoring between Manila and Cavite. From his vantage point Cooke could see the Spanish squadron dismasted and under repair in Cavite, the ships of the line San Pedro Apóstol, Europa and Montañés and the frigates Santa Maria de la Cabeza and Santa Lucía in dock and unfit for action. Other sources says it was frigates Fama and Nuestra Señora del Pilar. To Cooke's disappointment he could also see the Manila galleon Marquesetta being unloaded at the Cavite docks and another valuable merchant ship, Rey Carlos, aground in the harbour. The Spanish had learned only shortly before Cooke's arrival that the British frigate HMS Resistance under Captain Edward Pakenham was in Philippine waters and had decided to remove the valuable cargo from the treasure ship rather than risk an attack.

Fox was the first British ship into the anchorage, and was consequently approached by the guard boat, whose crew came aboard. Malcolm, like Cooke, spoke French fluently and with Bernard translating was able to persuade the officer in charge that the new arrivals were Forte and Prudente seeking supplies and Spanish reinforcements for commerce raiding operations. The officer offered supplies but cautioned that none of the Spanish ships would be in a position to sail until March at the earliest. Cooke then joined the party on the deck of Fox, claiming to be Commodore Latour, a French officer who, unknown to the Spanish, had been killed in the action of 9 September 1796 off Sumatra. The Spanish officer was now completely convinced by the ruse, which had been augmented by fake French uniforms. Inviting the visitor below decks, Cooke then passed wine around and together they drank a series of toasts, including "the downfall of England".

For an hour the officers drank, Malcolm and Cooke learning detailed information about the state of the defences and squadron in the Philippines, until a second boat pulled alongside Fox containing more officers keen to greet the French arrivals. This vessel was the personal barge of the Spanish commander at Cavite, Squadron Commander Ignacio María de Álava, who was not aboard, but who sent a message via an aide in a third boat. Each time, the officers were escorted below to join the festivities whereupon their crews were seized at gunpoint and taken below decks as prisoners of war. In Malcolm's cabin, the captured officers were informed of their situation, promised release before the British frigates sailed, and offered more wine. The crew of Fox meanwhile forced the captured Spanish sailors to strip and donned their clothing. Climbing into the Spanish boats this party rowed for the mouth of the nearby Pasig River, where they had learned that three heavy gunboats were moored. Taking the crews by surprise, the British boarding parties drove off the Spanish without a fight and brought all three boats alongside Fox. These vessels normally carried crews of thirty and were well-armed, one with a 32-pounder long gun and two with 24-pounder long guns, each supplemented by four swivel guns.

The harbour captain reached Fox shortly afterwards, furious at the seizure of the gunboats and demanding they be returned. Malcolm received him with a tirade of near incomprehensible French and brought him to join the other captured officers in his cabin, while the boat's crew were imprisoned below decks. Shortly afterwards, at 16:00, Cooke and Malcolm hosted a large dinner for their officer captives and sent food and grog to the crew, the total number of Spanish sailors on Fox now numbering approximately 200. Once the meal was finished, Cooke allowed all of the captives to return to their boats and row for shore without the conditions of parole, although he retained the captured gunboats.

=== Zamboanga ===
Cooke led his small squadron past Corregidor on 15 January and turned south. Four days later in a storm one of the gunboats broke its tow line and was never seen again, lost with its twelve crew. The frigates subsequently scouted Mindanao before reaching Zamboanga on 22 January. There Cooke raised Spanish colours in an attempt to deceive the authorities into supplying food and water to his squadron but Sybille grounded on a sandbank at the entrance to the port, which raised the suspicions of a guard boat sent by the governor of Zamboanga, Raymundo Español. The captain of the Spanish boat asked the British ships the names of their captains, and on receiving no answer but a volley of small arms fire, he put the town on alert. With the defenders forewarned, Cooke abandoned his ruse and after refloating Sybille the following morning, ordered a bombardment of the fort protecting the harbour. This had little effect, though later the Spanish recovered at least 450 cannonballs from different calibres, and Malcolm then attempted an amphibious landing in order to storm the landward side of the fort. The boats came under heavy fire, one smashed by a cannonball, killing two and wounding four. Another boat grounded on a sandbar and became stuck; so with his force in disarray, as 250 villagers armed with lances ambushed and drove the British from the beach, Malcolm called off the operation. After exchanging shot for an hour both frigates cut their anchor cables and retreated out of range, with two dead and one wounded on Sybille and eight wounded on Fox, in addition to those lost in the boats. The defenders lost a single man killed and 4 wounded.

With his frigates now requiring repairs, Cooke withdraw half a league from Zamboanga and spent three days refitting the masts and rigging of the ships. Then he sailed north, scuttling the two remaining gunboats as he did not believe they would survive the return journey to Canton. Four days later, on 27 January the squadron halted at a village named "Pullock" in the north of the Sultanate of Maguindanao to collect fresh water. On the beach a boat party from Sybille was set upon by Lumad tribesmen. Two were killed and nine others taken captive and dragged into the forest before rescuers could arrive. Cooke complained to Sultan Kibab Sahriyal at Kuta Wato and the captured sailors were eventually recovered, although not before Sybille and Fox had sailed for China to escort the merchant convoy back to India.

== Aftermath ==
Cooke's opportunistic diversion had determined that the Spanish forces in the Philippines posed no immediate threat, although the mission had cost 18 lives: Admiral Rainier later expressed his satisfaction with the outcome in a letter to the Admiralty. More might have been achieved with reinforcements: Historian C. Northcote Parkinson suggests that had Cooke's squadron united with Resistance together they may have been able to destroy the disarmed Spanish warships at Cavite. He also notes however that in this scenario Pakenham would have been commanding officer, a man with considerably less imagination and guile than Cooke. Historian Richard Woodman was critical of the mission, considering the operation to have "no glorious outcome" and citing the failure to capture the treasure ships as its greatest short-coming.

The 1798 China Fleet sailed without further incident. During the ensuing year Resistance was destroyed by an accidental explosion in July in the Bangka Strait, and the majority of Rainier's forces were focused on disrupting the French occupation of Suez in the Red Sea. This diversion of British resources created gaps in the coverage in merchant shipping and Sercey was able to send the frigate Preneuse and corvette Brûle-Gueule to Manila late in the year to join the repaired Spanish squadron. At the beginning of February 1799, this combined force sailed to Macau, taking the British defences by surprise. The British commander Captain William Hargood counterattacked, advancing on the Franco-Spanish force which retreated during the day and disappeared under cover of darkness that evening in the Wanshan Archipelago. The combined squadron then dispersed and the China Fleet was not attacked again until the Battle of Pulo Aura in 1804, at which a French squadron was again driven off in confusion. The frigates Cooke had mimicked, Forte and Prudente, were sent to operate independently against British trade in the Indian Ocean in early 1799. Prudente was captured by HMS Daedalus at the Action of 9 February 1799 near Southern Africa, and Forte was intercepted by HMS Sybille under Cooke on 28 February near Balasore in Bengal. In the ensuing battle Forte was captured but Cooke was mortally wounded, dying on 25 May.
