= Ambroise Louis Garneray =

French painter (1783–1857)

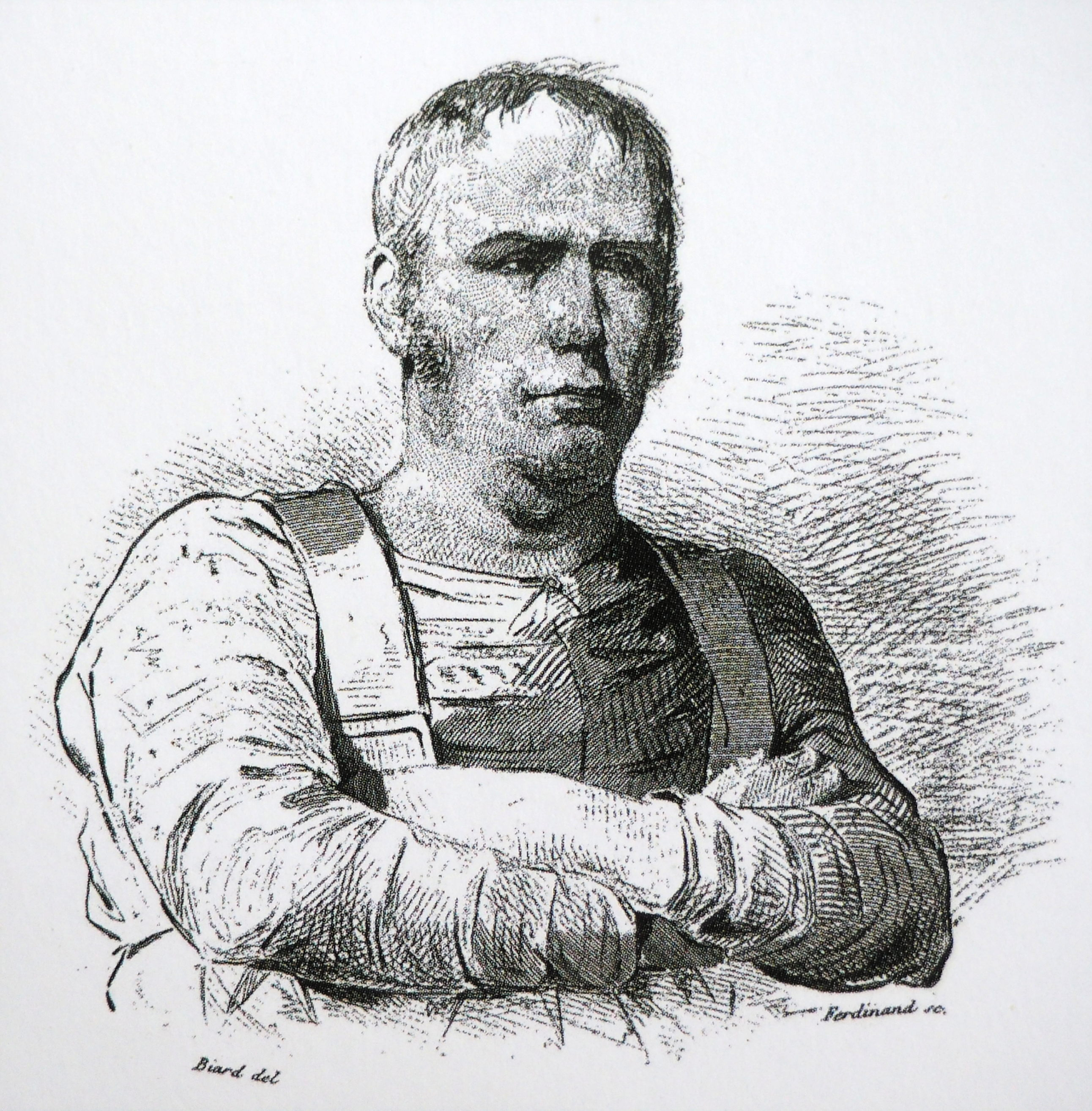
- Born: 19 February 1783; Paris, France
- Died: 11 September 1857 (aged 74)
- Occupations: corsair; artist; author
- Title: Peintre officiel de la Marine

Ambroise Louis Garneray (19 February 1783 – 11 September 1857) was a French corsair, painter and writer. He served under Robert Surcouf and Jean-Marie Dutertre, and was held as prisoner-of-war aboard Royal Navy prison hulks for eight years before being captured and repatriated at the conclusion of the Napoleonic Wars, continuing his career as a painter until his death in 1857.

== Biography ==
=== Early life ===
Garneray was born in Paris (on Rue Saint-Andre-des-arts, in the Latin Quarter) on 19 February 1783. He was the oldest son of Jean-François Garneray (1755–1837), painter of the king, who was pupil of Jacques-Louis David. At thirteen, he joined the Navy as a seaman, encouraged by his cousin, Beaulieu-Leloup, commander of the frigate Forte ("the Stout one"). Garneray sailed from Rochefort to the Indian Ocean with the frigate division under Sercey, to which the Forte belonged.

Garneray took part in the various campaigns of Sercey division, seeing action against the British warships Arrogant and Victorious. He then served in 1798 on the corvette Brûle Gueule ("Mouth burner"), which patrolled with the frigate Preneuse ("the Taker"). Returning from this campaign, the Brûle Gueule and Preneuse were chased by a British squadron comprising two ships of the line, one frigate and one corvette; the French flew into a creek near Rivière Noire District whose shallow waters prevented the British from pursuing. The next day, the British squadron attacked; the French had established strong defensive positions by installing the unusable cannons of their ships ashore, and repelled the British.

In 1799, Garneray was promoted to quartermaster and "first painter of the edge" on the Preneuse under captain Jean-Marthe-Adrien l'Hermite. The frigate was the last French official force in the Indian Ocean. This patrol fought against the British ship of the line Jupiter. Returning to Mauritius, her crew suffered from scurvy, and the Preneuse had to be kept quarantined and had to return to the British forces blockading of the island. Garneray escaped captivity by regaining the coast with the stroke. In spite of the disaster, Garneray kept longstanding admiration and friendship for Lhermitte, whom he would continue to visit until his death 1826.

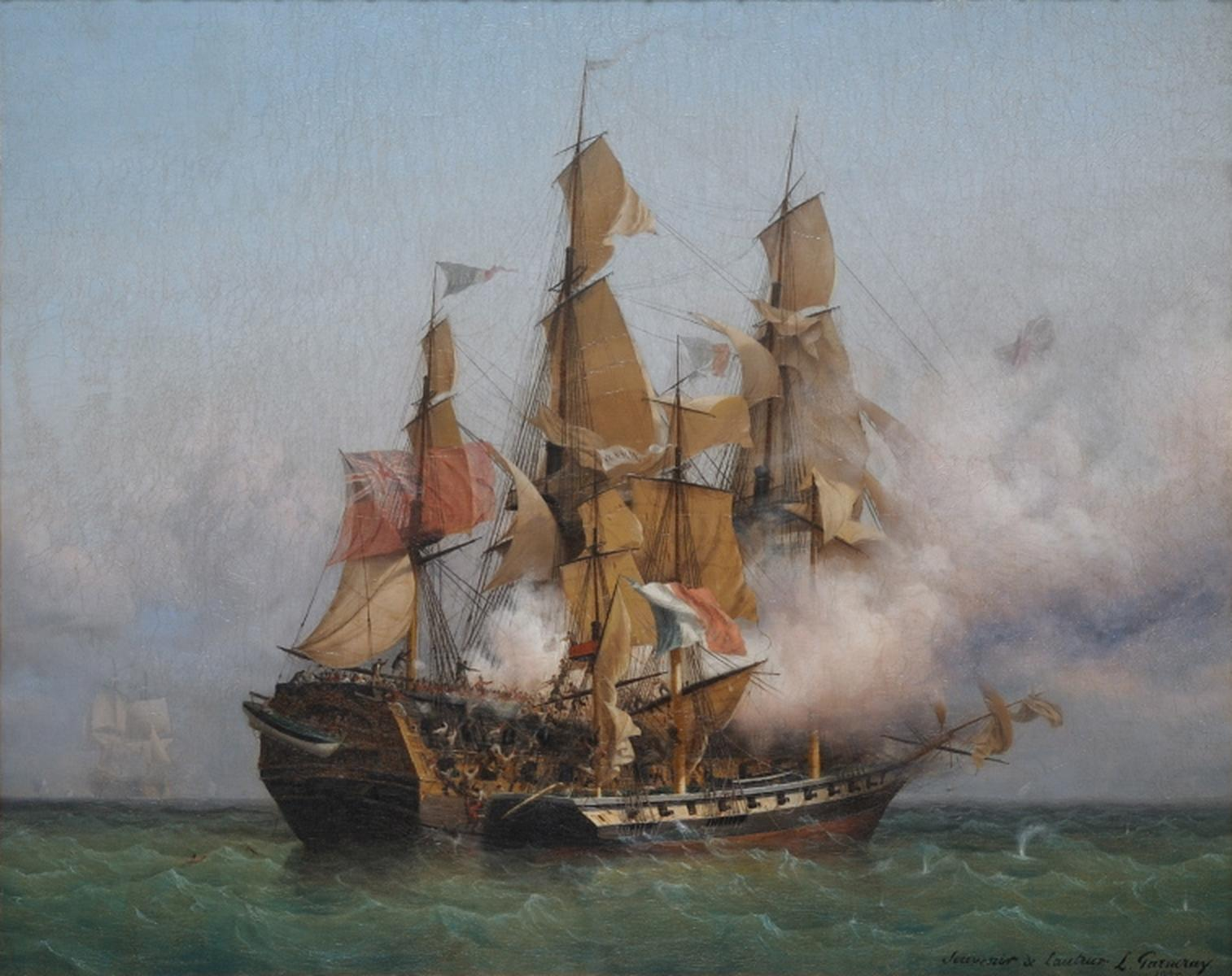
Garneray: Capture of Kent by Surcouf

For lack of official ships, Garneray joined the Confiance ("the Trust") of Robert Surcouf as an ensign, from April at December 1800. He took part in the capturing and boarding the Kent in October 1800. It was the only time where Garneray made money as a sailor. Upon returning from patrol, he invested his share in the slave ship L'Union, on which he was a first mate.

He sailed on various trading ships during the peace of Amiens, after which he served aboard the Pinson ("the Finch"), a cutter based in Île Bourbon. He replaced the commander when he died, and was shipwrecked shortly thereafter. He then served on the corsair Tigre du Bengale and eventually on the frigate Atalante attached to the squadron of Linois. He later served on the frigate Belle Poule, and was aboard when she was captured by the British in March 1806. Wounded, Garneray was transported to England and spent the eight following years in prison hulks off Portsmouth (on the Protée, the Couronne ("Crown") Vengeance and Assistance. He was able to improve his standard of living by selling paintings to a local merchant.

A statement attributed to him goes: "But for piracy, I believe that I practiced about all kinds of navigation".

=== Life as a painter ===
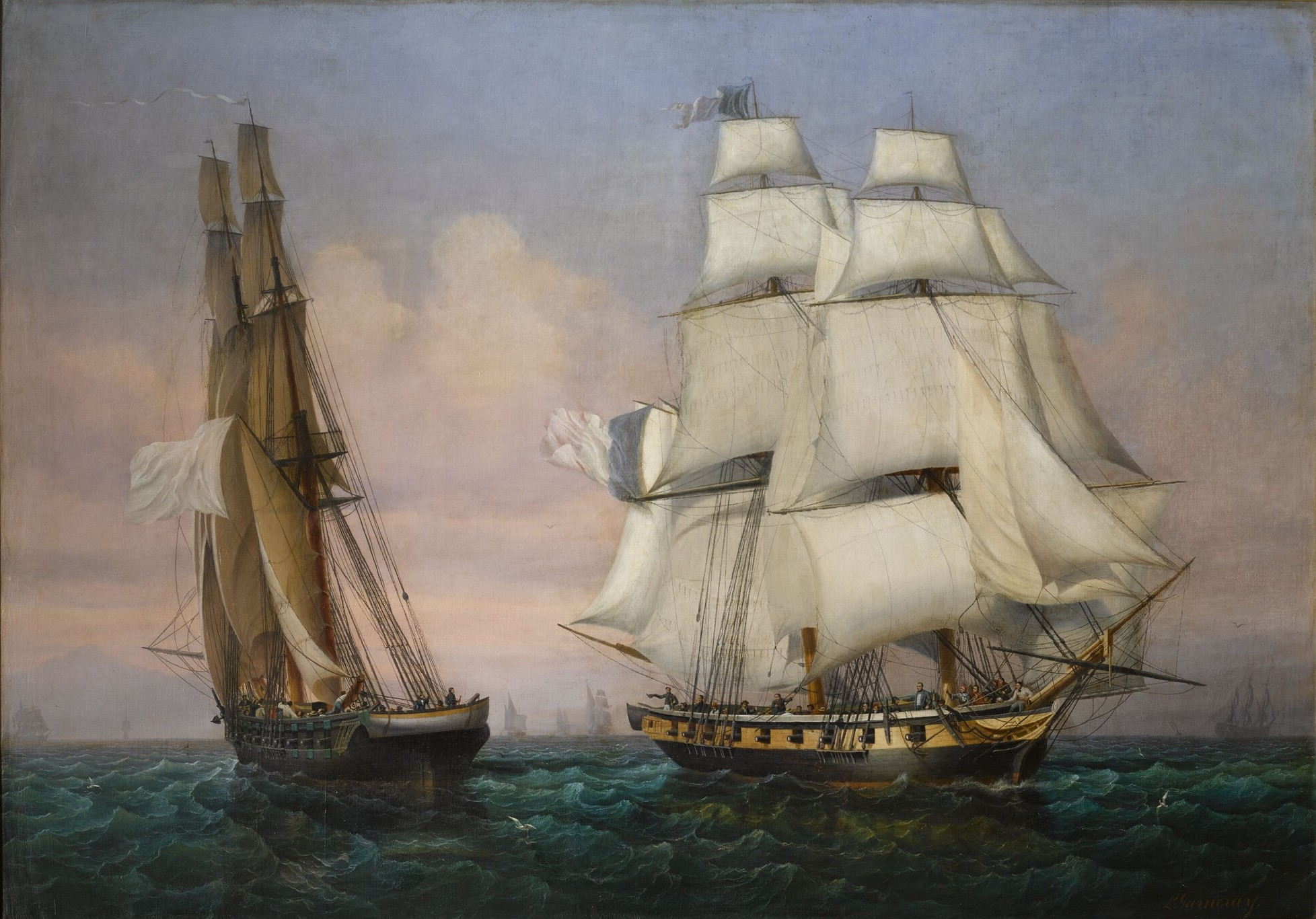
Garneray: Return from the Isle of Elba

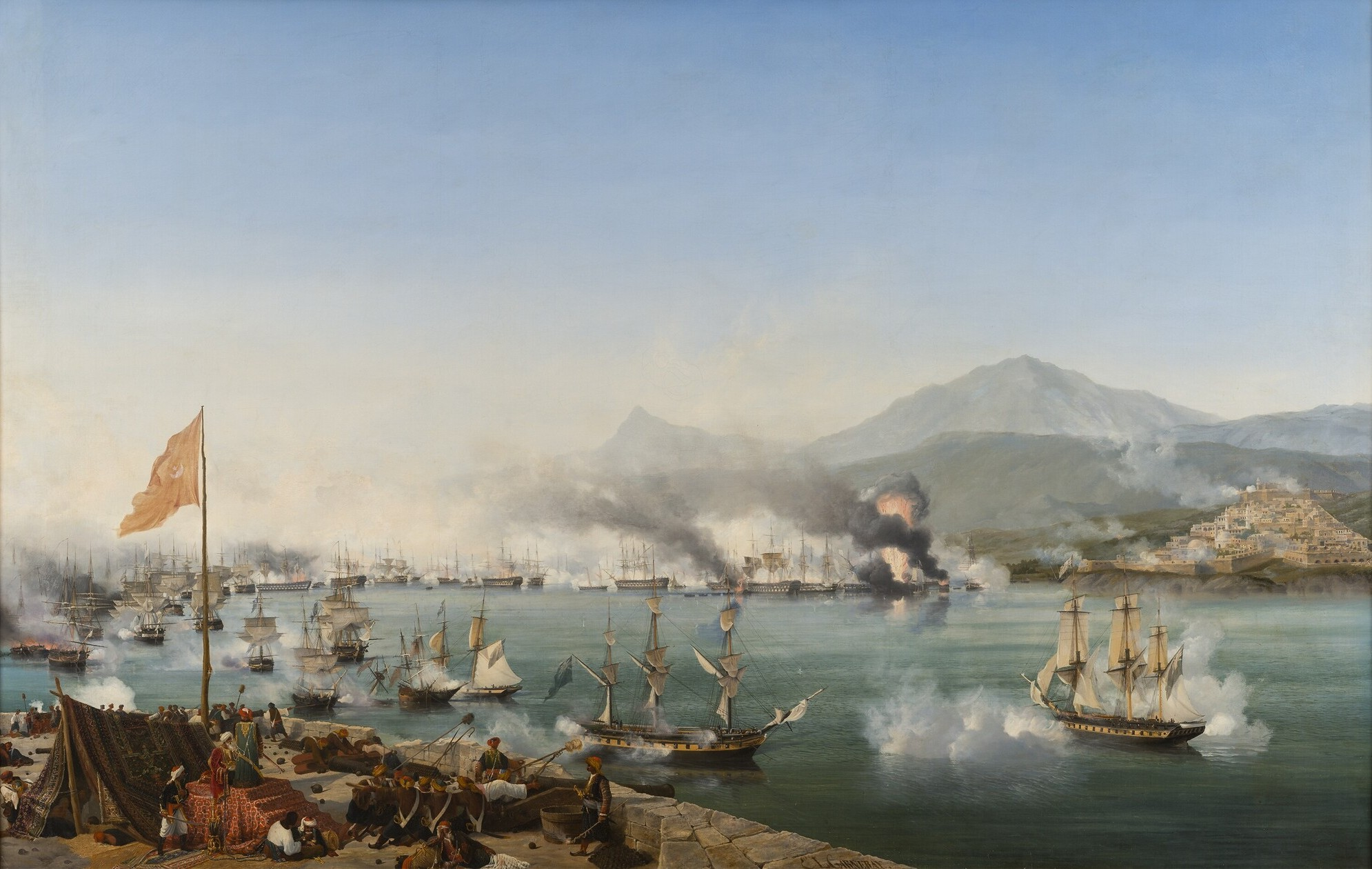
Garneray: The Naval Battle of Navarino (1827)

Released on 18 May 1814, Garneray did not find employment in the commercial navy and remained in Paris where he devoted himself to painting. Probably thanks to one of his brothers, himself painter and engraver and who knew people in the entourage of Napoleon, he received his first official order: the meeting of l'Inconstant and the Zéphir, as an anecdote of the return from Elba. The work was carried out only in 1834 as, because of the political climate of the Bourbon Restoration, he felt it more convenient to paint the Descent of the French emigrants at Quiberon, which was exhibited at the Salon de Paris in 1815. Garneray attended the salon every year from then.

Garneray came to be employed by the duke of Angoulême, then Grand Admiral of France, and became his appointed painter in 1817. He was in fact the first Peintre de la Marine ("official painter of the Navy"). Between 1821 and 1830, he went in many harbours of France where he made numerous sketches which were used as a basis for engravings or fabrics.

In 1833, he was made director of the museum of Rouen. He later joined the Manufacture nationale de Sèvres. In the 1830s he developed a new genre of painting, the aquatint, and also developed a major career of engraving. In the 1840s, his fame seems to have dimmed; he lost most of his political supporters and fell into poverty. He took part in the failed Strasbourg Coup led by future emperor Napoleon III, and later experienced a short return of glory towards the beginning of the Second French Empire, as he was awarded the Legion of Honour in 1852 by vice admiral Jacques Bergeret and the Emperor himself.

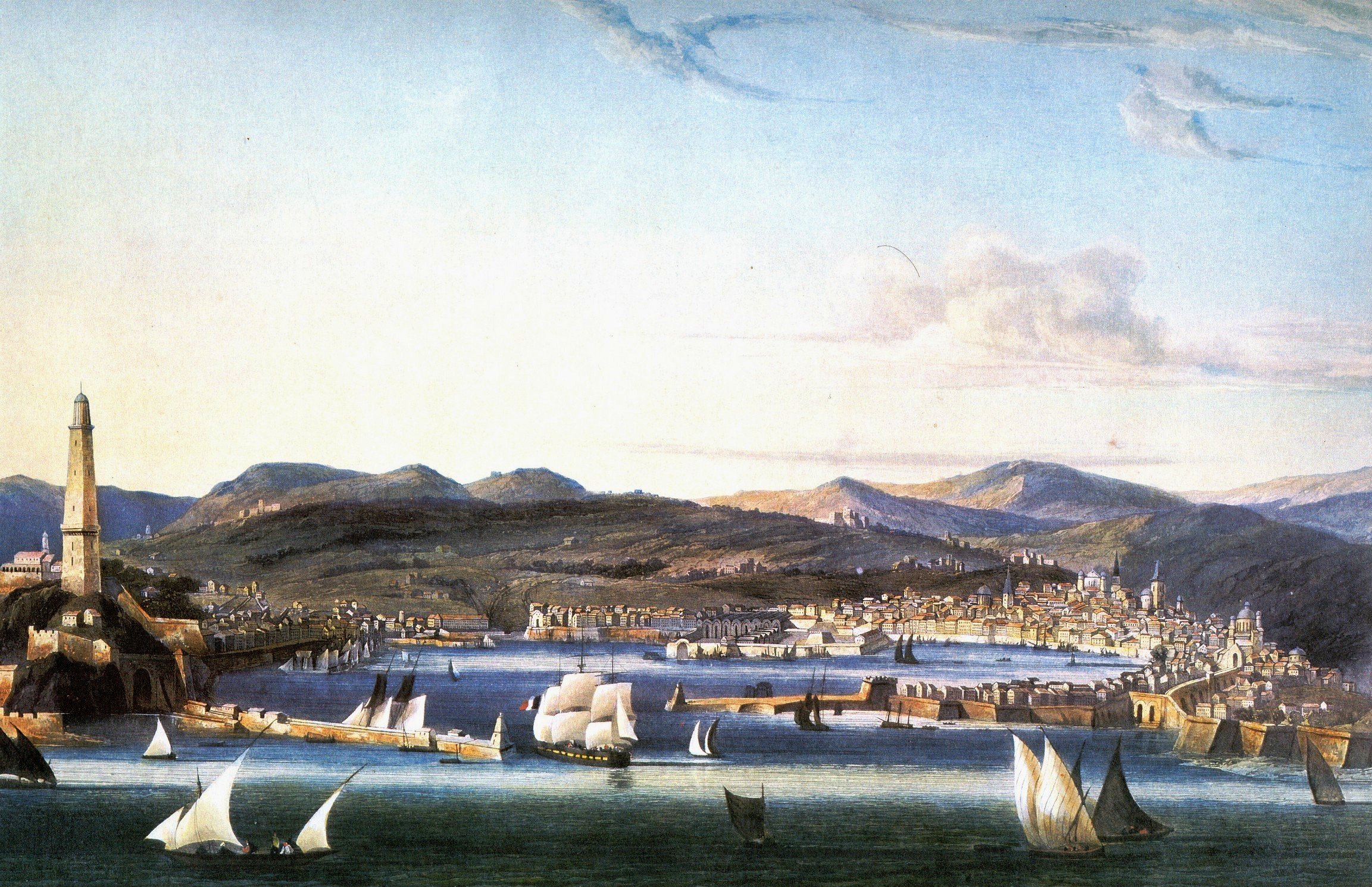
Garneray: View of Genoa (ca 1810)

Developing a tremor which prevented him from writing and which complicated his work as a painter, he died in Paris in 1857, a few months only before his wife was mysteriously assassinated. Garneray was buried at the Montmartre cemetery: A close friend of his had the tombstone decorated with a painter's palette, a ship mast and the Legion of Honour.

== Paintings ==
The pictorial work of Garneray comprises 141 oil paintings, 176 engravings and 22 watercolour paintings. Part of his work was inspired by his adventurous life, such as the capture of Kent by Surcouf; others were made as peintre officiel de la Marine, in continuation of the works of Claude Joseph Vernet and Nicolas Ozanne. Most notably, he realised 64 sights of French harbours and 40 sights of foreign harbours (engravings), following the journeys he accomplished in the 1820s. Some of the paintings were given to the Paris Chamber of Commerce by the industrialist Meunier.

His two brothers Hippolyte and Auguste, like his sister Pauline, also practised painting to a lesser extent. That explains the variations of signatures (sometimes Garneray, sometimes Garnerey), which were to distinguish the painters of the family.

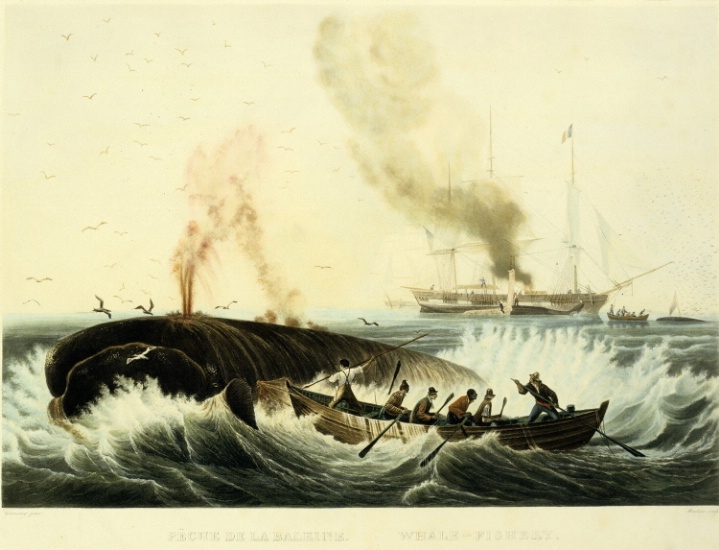
Garneray: Pesche De La Baleine

=== In literature ===
Garneray's depictions were mentioned in Herman Melville's 1851 novel Moby-Dick:

But, taken for all in all, by far the finest, though in some details not the most correct, presentations of whales and whaling scenes to be anywhere found, are two large French engravings, well executed, and taken from paintings by one Garnery [sic]. Respectively, they represent attacks on the Sperm and Right Whale...

Who Garnery the painter is, or was, I know not. But my life for it he was either practically conversant with his subject, or else marvellously tutored by some experienced whaleman. (CHAPTER 56: Of the Less Erroneous Pictures of Whales and the True Pictures of Whaling Scenes)

== Literary works by Garneray ==
Garneray wrote epic depictions of his adventures, becoming one of the precursors of the maritime novel of adventure.

During his stay in Rouen, he published articles about his sailing and captivity days. He offered these texts to the Ministry of Education in 1847 "for edification of the youth", which politely rebuffed him. His posthumous celebrity stems from the fad of more or less apocryphal memoirs of combatants of Revolution and of Empire which became popular in the 1860s. Garneray's memoirs were published in three volumes as Voyages, Aventures et Combats,Mes Pontons, and Scenes Maritimes. They were probably partly rewritten by professional writers, notably Édouard Corbière, introducing spectacular but irrealistic elements:

- Lhermitte being poisoned in Mauritius, a thesis often repeated in biographies of Lhermitte; in fact, from 1798 until his death, he suffered from a tropical disease, probably an acute form of Malaria.
- the obfuscated story of Kernau's death
- Garneray being personally involved in incidents which he probably described without being an actor, like the shipwreck of the Amphitrite

Richard Rose's detailed analysis of the materials used in the writing of Mes Pontons (The Floating Prison 2003, 2012) shows the general unreliability of Garneray as a writer of verifiable history. Hence, his memoirs are not now considered to be a serious historical source. However, Sentant fort le goudron and Mes Pontons do constitute testimonies of everyday life in the navy of the time.

Various versions were published as

- Corsaire de la République , Voyages, adventures and combat, Paris, Éditions Phébus, 1984; Rééd. Payot, 1991
- Le Négrier de Zanzibar , Voyages, adventures and combat, Paris, Phébus, 1985; Rééd. Payot, 1992
- Un Corsaire au bagne. Mes pontons , Paris, Phébus, 1985; Rééd. Payot, 1992
- Un Corsaire de quinze ans ,
- Un Marin de Surcouf
- Les Naufragés du Saint Antoine
- The Floating Prison (translated by Richard Rose) Conway Maritime Press, 2003.
- The Floating Prison (revised e-book version, translated by Richard Rose) Otterquill Books, 2012.
