= Action of 28 February 1799 =

1799 battle of the East Indies theatre of the French Revolutionary Wars

- Part of the East Indies theatre of the French Revolutionary Wars
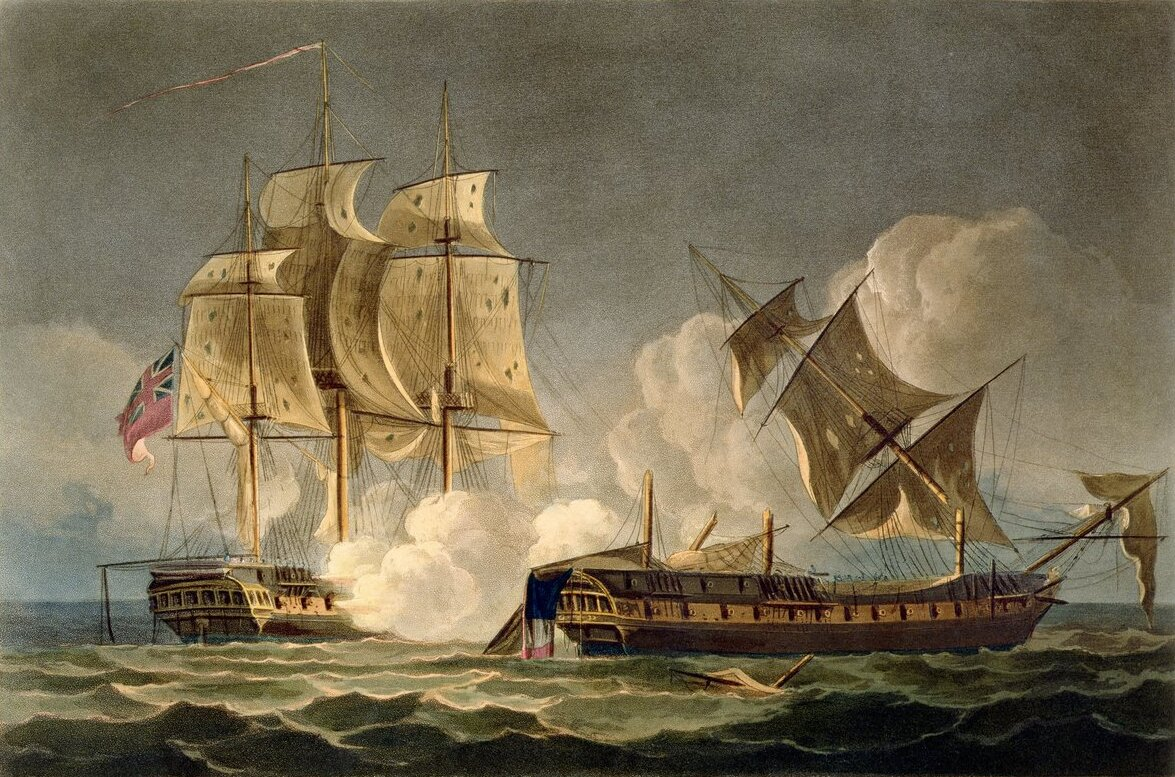
- Capture of La Forte, Feb 28th 1799; Thomas Whitcombe, 1816
Date	28 February 1799
Location	Off the Hooghly River, Bay of Bengal
Result	British victory

Belligerents
Great Britain	France

Commanders and leaders
Edward Cooke (DOW)	Hubert de Beaulieu †

Strength
1 frigate	1 frigate

Casualties and losses
6 killed 16 wounded	65 killed 80 wounded 1 frigate captured

The action of 28 February 1799 was a minor naval engagement of the East Indies theatre of the French Revolutionary Wars, fought off the mouth of the Hooghly River in the Bay of Bengal between the French frigate Forte and the Royal Navy frigate HMS Sybille. Forte was an exceptionally large and powerful ship engaged on a commerce raiding operation against British merchant shipping off the port of Calcutta in British India. To eliminate this threat, Sybille was sent from Madras in pursuit. Acting on information from released prisoners, Edward Cooke, captain of Sybille, was sailing off Balasore when distant gunfire alerted him to the presence of Forte on the evening of 28 February. The French frigate was discovered at anchor in the sandbanks at the mouth of the Hooghly with two recently captured British merchant ships.

For unclear reasons the French captain Hubert Le Loup de Beaulieu did not properly prepare Forte to receive the attack from Cooke's frigate and he was consequently killed in the first raking broadside from the British ship. Forte's crew continued to resist for more than two hours, only surrendering when their ship had been reduced to a battered wreck and more than a third of the crew killed or wounded. British losses by contrast were light, although Cooke had been struck by grape shot during the height of the action and suffered a lingering death three months later from his wounds. The captured merchant ships subsequently escaped under their French prize crews while Cooke's executive officer Lieutenant Lucius Hardyman repaired Sybille and Forte. Hardyman took both ships into Calcutta, where Forte was commissioned into the Royal Navy under the same name, although the frigate was accidentally wrecked in the Red Sea two years later.

== Background ==
In the spring of 1796 the Royal Navy enjoyed naval supremacy in the East Indies, the French Navy presence limited to two frigates loosely blockaded in Port Louis on Île de France. In April 1796 reinforcements were sent from Rochefort comprising four frigates commanded by Contre-amiral Pierre César Charles de Sercey. The squadron avoided the blockade and arrived at Île de France in July and sailed eastwards during the summer, intending to raid British trading ports in the East Indies. On 9 September the squadron was intercepted and driven off by a British squadron off the northeastern coast of Sumatra, sheltering in Batavia over the winter. In January Sercey sailed once more, encountering on 28 January in the Bali Strait a fleet of six East Indiamen bound to China from Colombo. In the ensuing Bali Strait Incident the British commander managed to deceive Sercey into believing that the fleet was made up of warships, the French admiral retreating back to Île de France.

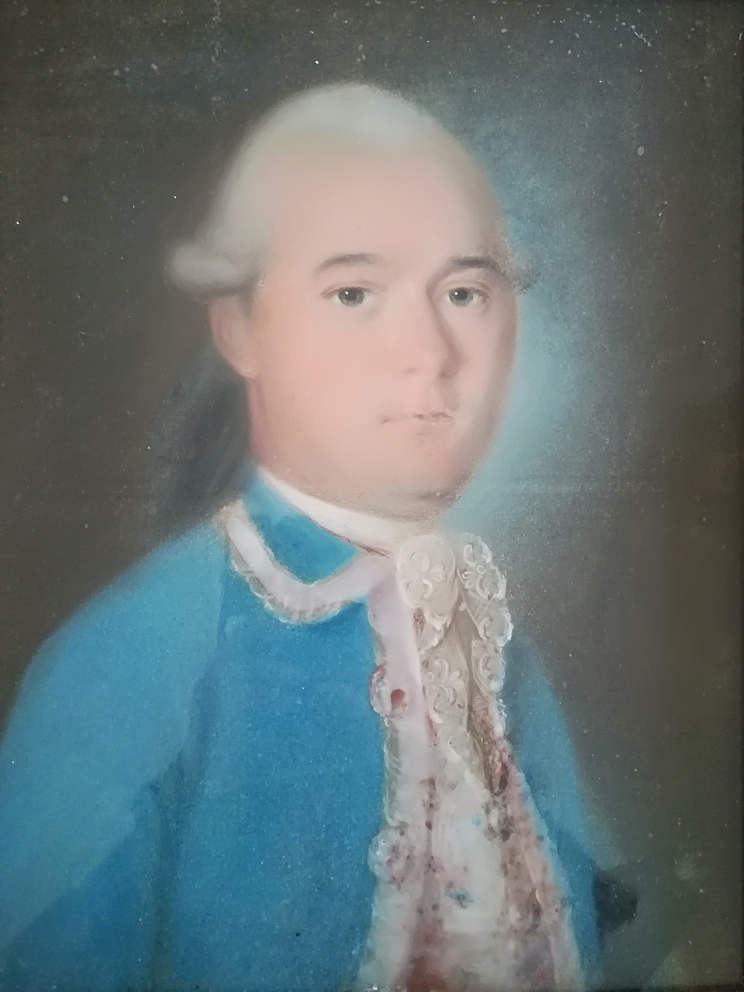
Hubert Le Loup de Beaulieu, the French commander at the action

Sercey's flagship during these operations was the 40-gun frigate Forte. Forte, commanded by the elderly Frigate Captain Hubert Le Loup de Beaulieu, had been built in 1794 based on the hull and frame of a ship of the line: the frigate weighed 1,400 tons bm, the largest purpose-built frigate at sea. The main battery of Forte consisted of 28 24-pounder long guns, only the second frigate ever built (after Pomone) which could manage such a heavy armament. This was augmented by fourteen 8-pounder long guns on the upper deck and eight 36-pounder carronades on the quarterdeck, totaling 52 heavy cannon complemented by eight 1-pounder swivel guns. Uniquely, the sides of the ship were lined with cork matting to prevent splinters while the more common precaution had been taken of stringing netting over the deck to protect the crew from falling debris. The ship was however weakened by an ill-disciplined crew, and Sercey had expressed doubts about the ability of the aged Beaulieu.

After Sercey returned to Île de France his squadron broke up. Four ships were sent back to France in 1797 and 1798 as Île de France could no longer supply repairs, manpower or provisions in support of Sercey. This dispersal of the squadron was encouraged by the Colonial Assembly of Île de France and Governor Malartic neither of whom were well-disposed to the Directory then ruling France. With his remaining crews becoming rebellious, Sercey sent Forte and Prudente on a commerce raiding operation during the autumn of 1798, during which they achieved some success in the Bay of Bengal. By the time this force returned to Île de France Sercey had sailed to Batavia, leaving instructions for Forte and Prudente to follow him. Malartic countermanded this order, seizing Prudente and selling the frigate to a privateer concern and ordering Forte to operate independently in the Bay of Bengal in the autumn of 1798. Sercey was furious, but could do nothing to alter Malartic's arrangements.

At the start of 1799 the Bay of Bengal was largely undefended. The British naval commander, Rear-Admiral Peter Rainier, had taken most of his ships westwards to the Red Sea to participate in opposition to Napoleon Bonaparte's campaign in Egypt, leaving only a single frigate to protect trade shipping in the region. This ship was the 40-gun HMS Sybille, a large, powerful ship captured from the French at the Battle of Mykonos in 1794. Weighing more than 1,000 tons bm and with a maindeck battery of 28 18-pounder long guns supplemented by six 9-pounder long guns and fourteen 32-pounder cannonades, Sybille was a formidable ship, but significantly weaker than the massive Forte. Many of Sybille's crew had fallen ill while the ship had been stationed at Calcutta, leaving her undermanned. To compensate, the crew had been augmented by a detachment from the frigate HMS Fox and soldiers from the Scotch Brigade. In command was Captain Edward Cooke, who had distinguished himself early in the war by negotiating the surrender of the French Mediterranean port city of Toulon in 1793. This action, under threat of execution by the Republican faction in the city, led to the siege of Toulon and the destruction of almost half of the French Mediterranean Fleet. In January 1798 Cooke and Sybille had participated in the successful Raid on Manila.

== Battle ==
Forte's raiding cruise initially proved devastating. The usual raiding season had passed, and the shipping transiting the mouth of the Hooghly River was unprepared for Beaulieu's assault. In rapid succession Forte seized the local-trading country ships Recovery, Yarmouth, Chance and Surprise. Beaulieu was forced to send 143 sailors away as prize crews, reducing the complement on Forte by a quarter. Beaulieu had also only just missed a major convoy from the Cape Colony, escorted only by HMS Sceptre. The Canton East Indiamen Endeavour and Lord Mornington were taken off Balasore on 28 February, after coming under fire from Forte's bow chasers. The gunfire attracted the attention of Sybille, which was returning to Calcutta after transporting Lord Mornington, Governor-General of India, to Madras. Sybille had sailed on 19 February with instructions to search for Forte. On 23 February Cooke had encountered a cartel sent to Madras by Beaulieu and brought the ship into Balasore on 26 February. At 20:30, while sailing to the southeast, flashes were seen on the northeast horizon. Although this was initially dismissed as lightning, it continued until 21:00, convincing Cooke that it had another cause. Turning to the northeast, he took Sybille to investigate.

At 21:30 Forte and the captured merchant ships were visible from Sybille, Forte brilliantly illuminated in the tropical night. Cooke brought Sybille westwards in order to take the weather gage before wearing and bearing down on the French ship, under a light wind from the southwest. Despite the illumination on the French ship, Sybille's sails were clearly identified on Forte but Beaulieu gave no orders to prepare for action: he seems to have thought that the sails belonged to an approaching East Indiaman despite the concerns of his officers, or that he wished to lure Sybille close enough to ensure its defeat in the coming engagement.

At approximately midnight Forte slowly moved to the lee of Sybille, firing a small broadside at long range at the British ship's bow, accompanied by scattered fire from the French prize crews on the merchant ships. Apart from damage to the jib, Sibylle remained unharmed, advancing silently and in darkness. French fire continued with little effect, allowing Cooke to bring Sybille within 25 yards (23 m) of the stern of Forte at 12:45 and fire a raking broadside, followed by a second as the British ship pulled alongside the French frigate. The cannon were complemented by musketry from the soldiers aboard, which swept the exposed deck of Forte. The damage to the French ship was catastrophic: guns were smashed from their carriages and dozens of men killed and more wounded, the dead including Beaulieu and his first lieutenant.

Despite their losses the French survivors returned to the remaining guns, although most of their first broadside scattered into the sea, and at least some of their shot was misdirected towards the merchant ships. The French gunners aimed too high however, most of their shot tearing through the rigging of Sybille while the British broadsides slammed into the hull of Forte. This problem was partly attributed to the French gun quoins which had been replaned three days earlier, exacerbated by the lack of suitable gun crews which meant that many of the upperdeck guns were unmanned. The French gunners were also more used to firing warning shots at distant merchant ships and may not have realised that their guns needed to be depressed for combat at point blank range.

For the next hour and a half the frigates poured shot into one another at close range, until Cooke was struck by grape shot at 01:30 on 1 March, replaced by his first lieutenant Lucius Hardyman. For another hour the action continued, French fire gradually slackening until it stopped completely at 02:30, by which time only four French guns remained operational. Hardyman hailed to ask whether Forte had surrendered but the French did not reply and he ordered another broadside. A second hail also brought no response but sailors were seen attempting to repair the rigging on Forte. Concerned that the French were attempting to escape, Hardyman concentrated his fire on the masts of Forte, bringing them crashing down one by one until at 03:00 Forte was completely dismasted. With all resistance ended, British merchant prisoners on board Forte emerged from below decks and hailed Sybille, requesting a boat be sent across so that British Lieutenant Nicholas Manger could formally take the surrender of the French ship.

=== Combatant summary ===
In this table, "Guns" refers to all cannon carried by the ship, including the maindeck guns which were taken into consideration when calculating its rate, as well as any carronades carried aboard. Broadside weight records the combined weight of shot which could be fired in a single simultaneous discharge of an entire broadside.

Ship	Commander	Navy	Guns	Tons	Broadside weight	Complement	Casualties		
Ship	Commander	Navy	Guns	Tons	Broadside weight	Complement	Killed	Wounded	Total
HMS Sybille	Captain Edward Cooke †		48	1091bm	503 pounds (228 kg)	371	5	17	22
Forte	Captain Hubert Le Loup de Beaulieu †	France official	52	1401bm	610 pounds (280 kg)	c.370	65	c.80	c.145
Source: Clowes, p. 521

== Aftermath ==
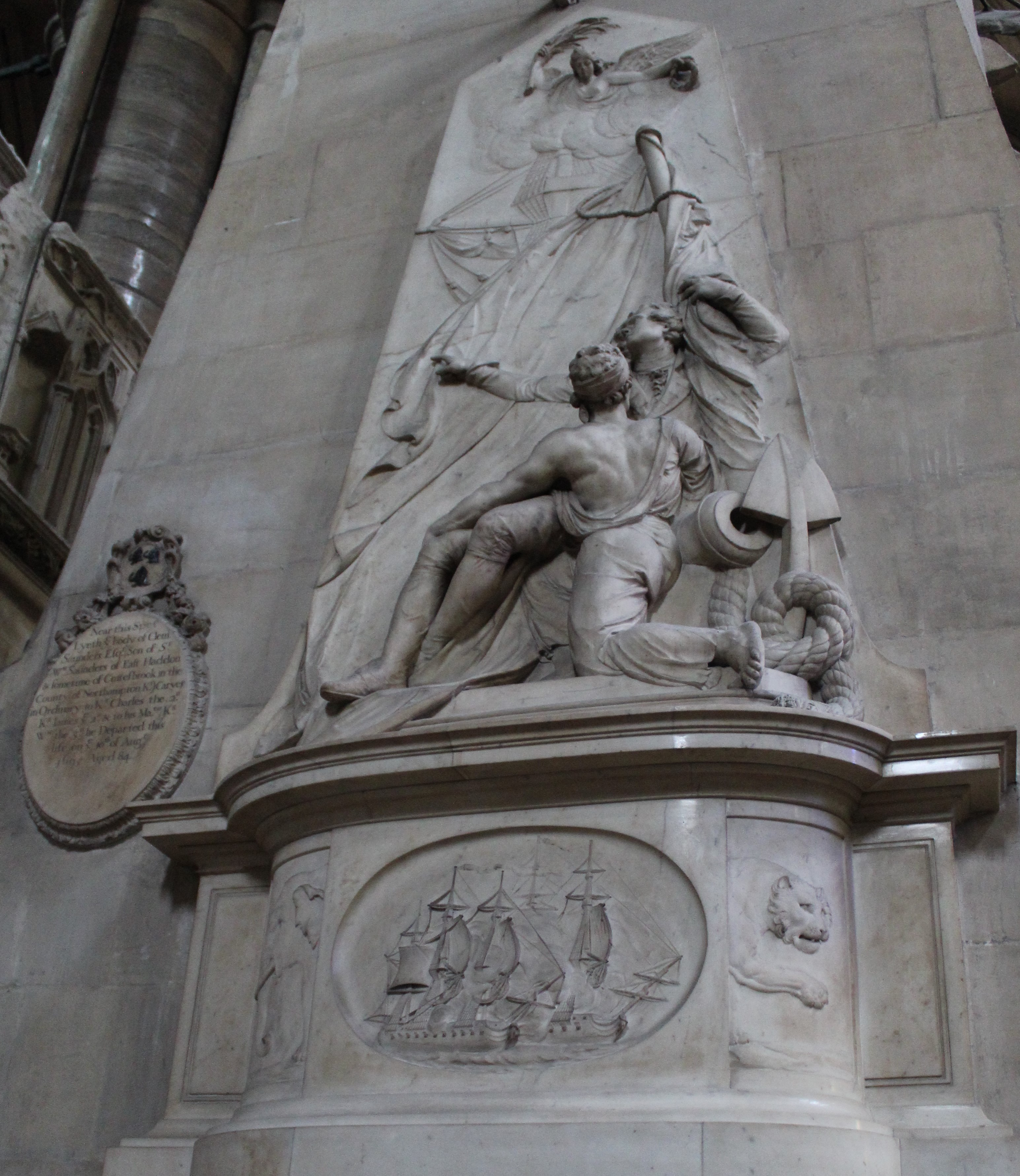
Memorial to Cooke in Westminster Abbey

Damage to Forte was extensive. The stern and side facing Sybille had been beaten in by gunfire as more than 300 shot holes combined to form gaping holes in hull above the waterline. As well as the masts the bulkheads had been smashed apart and all deck furniture blasted to splinters. 65 of the crew had been killed, including Captain Beaulieu, and approximately 80 wounded, more than a third of the crew listed as casualties; many of the wounded later died from the effects of amputation. Damages to Sybille were considerably lighter: only six shot had struck the hull in the entire battle: one gun was dismounted, but the worst damage was to Cooke's cabin where a round shot had destroyed most of his furniture. In addition, most of the damage to the masts and rigging proved superficial. Just five crew were killed outright, with another 17 wounded, the latter including Cooke. The British captain had been struck in the left arm, the shot exiting near his spine, with additional injuries to the chest and right arm. He eventually died after a long and agonising deterioration at Calcutta on 25 May 1799 and was buried under a monument with full military honours. A memorial was subsequently placed in Westminster Abbey in his memory.

In the initial aftermath of victory, Hardyman attempted to lure the captured merchant ships close to Sybille by raising the French tricolor over the British ensign. Lord Mornington took the bait and closed with the British ship. However, when Sybille gave chase the prizes fled, the fatigued British crew unable to effectively pursue after losing their damaged cross-jack yard. Forte had lost its anchors in the battle and was consequently lashed to Sybille. Repairs to the combatants took two days, particularly the fitting of jury masts on Forte, before Hardyman was comfortable making the journey up the Hooghly to Calcutta for more permanent repairs. Hardyman was commended for the victory, promoted to commander and then later post captain. Forte was subsequently taken into service in the Royal Navy under the same name as a 44-gun fifth rate frigate with Hardyman in command. Forte continued in service in the Indian Ocean under Hardyman until June 1801, when the frigate was wrecked on the Arabian Red Sea coast near Jeddah. Nearly five decades after the battle, the Admiralty recognised the action with the clasp "SYBILLE 28 FEBRUARY 1799" attached to the Naval General Service Medal, awarded upon application to all British participants still living in 1847.

The battle has been considered by British historians as an unusual engagement marked by extremely disciplined fire from Sybille, the product of unusually extensive gunnery training by Cooke and complemented by the musket fire of the soldiers which affected the accuracy of the French gunners. Naval historian William James wrote that "the action of the Sibylle [sic] and Forte was gallantly fought on both sides, but skilfully fought on one side only; the weaker side, and, by the due exercise of that skill, the one which was ultimately successful.
