= Edward Cooke (Royal Navy officer) =

Royal Navy officer

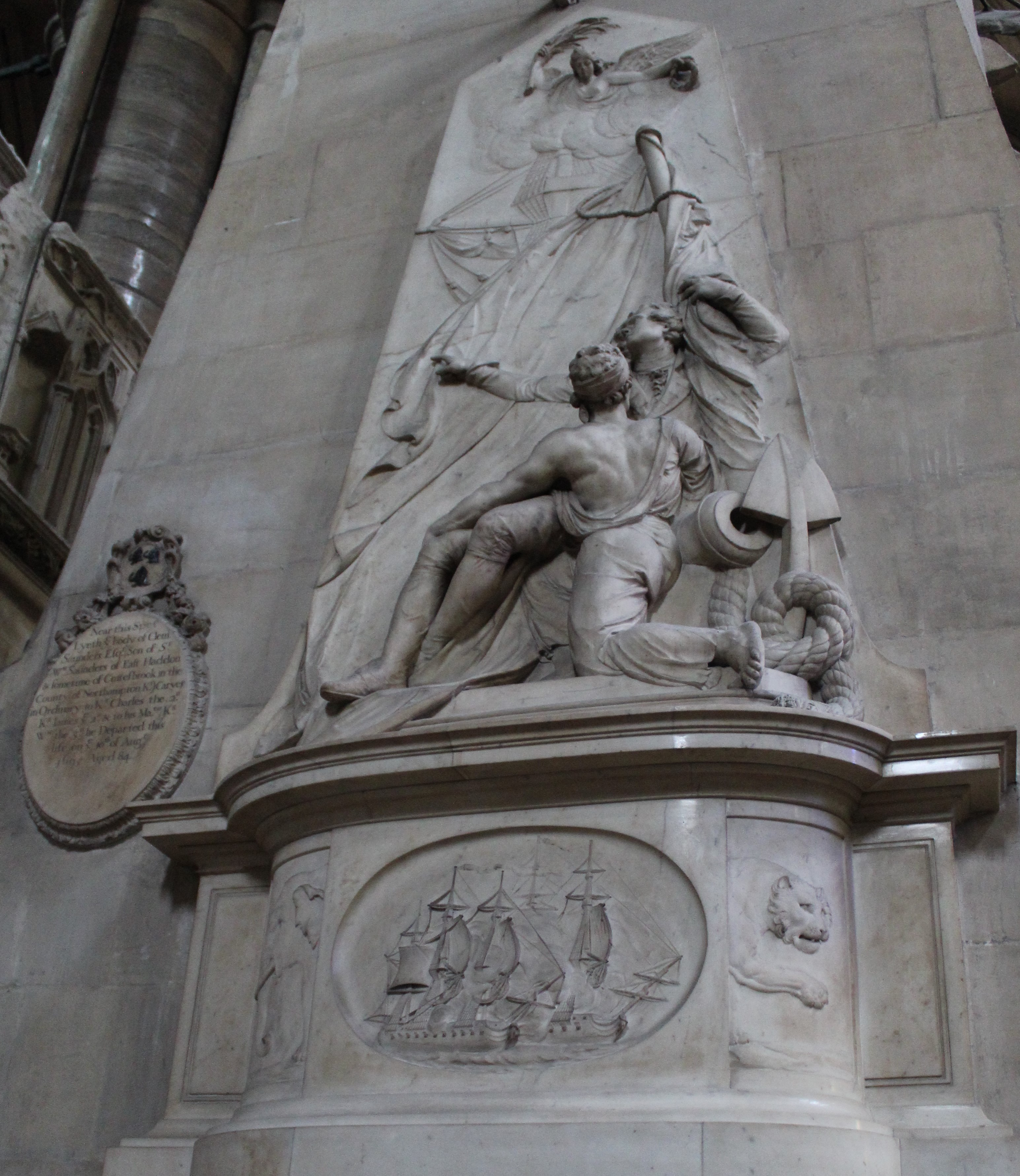
- Monument to Cooke in Westminster Abbey by John Bacon
- Born: 14 April 1772; Harefield, Middlesex
- Died: 25 May 1799 (aged 27); Calcutta, British India
- Military career
- Allegiance: Great Britain
- Branch: Royal Navy
- Service years: ?–1799
- Rank: Captain
- Conflicts: French Revolutionary Wars; Siege of Toulon; Raid on Manila; Action of 28 February 1799

Captain Edward Cooke (14 April 1772 – 25 May 1799) was a Royal Navy officer of the late eighteenth century who was best known for his service during the French Revolutionary Wars. Cooke gained notoriety in the first year of the war as a junior officer when he was entrusted with the surrender negotiations of the French port city of Toulon. Cooke's success under threat of execution led to the British occupation of the city and the ensuing Siege of Toulon. Cooke was promoted for the successful negotiations and given command of the large captured French frigate HMS Sybille in the Indian Ocean. In 1798 he led a successful bloodless raid on the port of Manila in the Spanish Philippines. In the following year Cooke tracked down and engaged the powerful French raiding frigate Forte off the mouth of the Hooghly River at the action of 28 February 1799. In the ensuing battle, Forte was captured but Cooke was struck by grape shot. He would die in Calcutta on 25 May and was interred with full military honours.

== Life ==
Cooke was born in April 1772 to Colonel George and Penelope Cooke of Harefield, Middlesex. His brothers George Cooke and Henry Frederick Cooke were both later prominent army officers, as was his stepfather Edward Smith. He joined the Royal Navy at a young age and in 1790 was promoted to lieutenant, joining HMS Victory in 1793 for Mediterranean service under Lord Hood during the French Revolutionary Wars. In August 1793, Hood was approached by representatives of the French Royalist faction offering to surrender the powerful naval port city of Toulon in exchange for protection. Cooke was already familiar with the port and was selected as the British delegation to the authorities, entering the port surreptitiously as the approaches were patrolled by Republican supporters from the fleet at anchor. Cooke came under fire during his entry to the port and was under threat of execution, but successfully negotiated the complete surrender of the city and fleet to Lord Hood.

Cooke then served as an aide to Sir George Keith Elphinstone, who was appointed governor during the ensuing Siege of Toulon, and escaped in December when the city was evacuated ahead of the advancing Republican armies. For his services, Cooke was promoted to post captain, participating at the Siege of Calvi under the command of Captain Horatio Nelson. In 1794 Cooke was given command of the 40-gun frigate HMS Sybille, recently captured from the French at the Battle of Mykonos. He took Sybille to the Cape of Good Hope and then eastward into the Indian Ocean as a convoy escort under the command of Rear-Admiral Peter Rainier. In 1798, accompanied by HMS Fox, Sybille entered the port of Manila in the Spanish Philippines disguised as a French ship and convinced the defenders to come alongside peacefully, thus seizing three gunboats and 200 prisoners of war, who were later released after being questioned. The Raid on Manila secured a considerable amount of valuable information.

In early 1799, Sybille was sent from Madras to search for the large and powerful French frigate Forte, which had been raiding British merchant shipping off the mouth of the Hooghly River, the passage to Calcutta. On 28 February near Balasore, Cooke sighted lights in the distance and sailed to investigate, discovering Forte and two recently captured merchant ships. Attacking at once and in the darkness, Cooke successfully surprised the unprepared French frigate, inflicting severe damage in the initial broadsides. At the height of the battle, Cooke was struck by grape shot from Forte and carried below, wounded in the chest, arms and spine. His deputy Lieutenant Lucius Hardyman assumed command and saw the defeat of Forte, which was later brought into Calcutta as a prize. The wounded Cooke was landed at the port and given medical treatment, but his wounds were too severe and he died after an agonizing three months on 25 May. He was buried with full military honors in the city under a monument provided in thanks by the East India Company. A large memorial by the sculptor John Bacon commemorating his victory and death was raised in Westminster Abbey in 1806.
