= William Paget (Royal Navy officer, born 1769) =

British Royal Navy officer and Member of Parliament

Captain William Paget

Member of Parliament for Anglesey
- In office 1790-1794

Personal details
- Born: 22 December 1769
- Died: September 1794 (aged 24); At sea
- Parent: Henry Paget (father)
- Relatives: Henry Paget (brother); Arthur Paget (brother); Edward Paget (brother); Charles Paget (brother); Berkeley Paget (brother)
- Military career
- Branch: Royal Navy
- Rank: Captain
- Commands: HMS Romney
- Battles / wars: Battle of Mykonos

Captain William Paget (22 December 1769 – September 1794) was a British Royal Navy officer and Member of Parliament.

== Background ==
Paget was the second son of Henry Paget, 1st Earl of Uxbridge, and Jane, daughter of the Very Reverend Arthur Champagné. He was the brother of Henry Paget, 1st Marquess of Anglesey, Sir Arthur Paget, Sir Edward Paget, Sir Charles Paget and Berkeley Paget. He was educated at Westminster School from 1779 to 1781, prior to entering the Royal Navy.

== Naval and political career ==
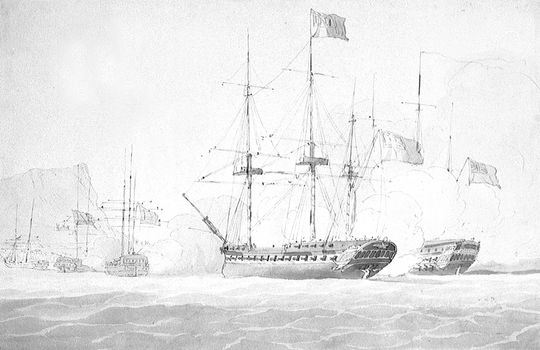
Capture of Sybille by HMS Romney

From Midshipman rank in 1783, Paget served in the Navy and achieved the rank of captain in 1793. On 17 July 1794, while commanding the 50-gun Fourth Rate HMS Romney, he captured the French frigate Sibylle, known as 'one of the largest the French had', at the Battle of Mykonos. In the two years before his death he also captured ten French merchant vessels.

In 1790 he was returned to parliament for Anglesey, succeeding his uncle Nicholas Bayly, a seat he held until his death four years later. His younger brother Sir Arthur Paget succeeded him as MP.

== Personal life ==
Paget died at sea in September 1794, aged 24, after an old wound, which he originally received by a murder attempt in Constantinople some eight to ten years earlier, reopened. He never married.

Parliament of Great Britain
Preceded by Nicholas Bayly	Member of Parliament for Anglesey; 1790–1794	Succeeded by Hon. Sir Arthur Paget
