= Hubert Le Loup de Beaulieu =

French Navy officer (18th century)

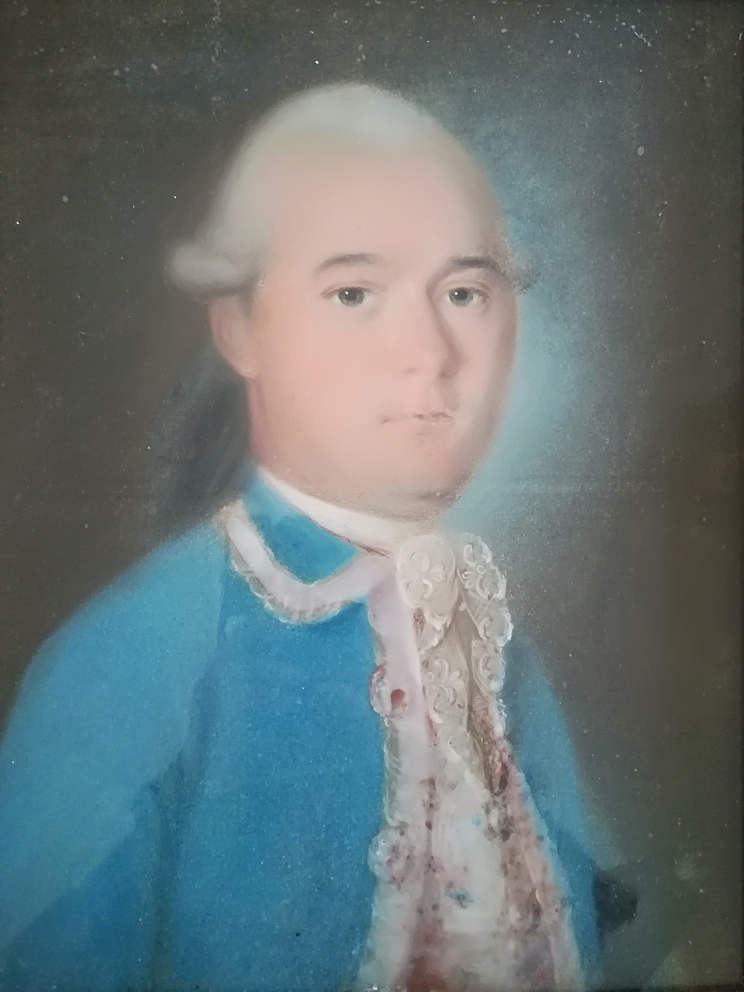
Portrait of Beaulieu

Hubert Le Loup de Beaulieu (died 1 March 1799) was a French Navy officer and sea captain. He was a cousin of Ambroise Louis Garneray.

== Career ==
=== Early life ===
He served as second ensign on the East Indiaman Comte de Provence from 1763 to 1764, and as first enseign on the chartered corvette Sage armed for Mauritius on 1 May 1766.

In 1776, he commanded the merchantman Carnate for a journey from Indian to China.

=== Sercey's squadron ===
In 1796, Beaulieu-Leloup served in the Navy in Rochefort with the rank of Commander. He commanded the frigate Forte in Sercey's squadron.

In September 1797, Sercey had him relieved of his command and he was replaced by Captain Ravenel, but reinstated on the insistence of Mauritius governor Malartic, (Note: Hennequin (p.210) proved a glimpse of Sercey's reluctance by referring to Beaulieu-Leloup as an "inept old man".) who caved in to pressure from the Colonial Assembly and sent Prudente and Forte to engage in independent commerce raiding off Bengal, disturbing Sercey's plans. Sercey was furious, and wrote to the Ministry of the Navy:

General Malartic knew that I intended not to leave such an important command as that of Forte in the hands of Captain Beaulieu, whose age and weariness have weakened the faculties.

On 24 February 1799, Forte engaged the East Indiaman Osterley. After the battle, Beaulieu-Leloup, deeming the fire from Forte to strike too low, ordered her guns raised by diminishing their quoins by 2.7 cm.

=== Battle with HMS Sybille ===
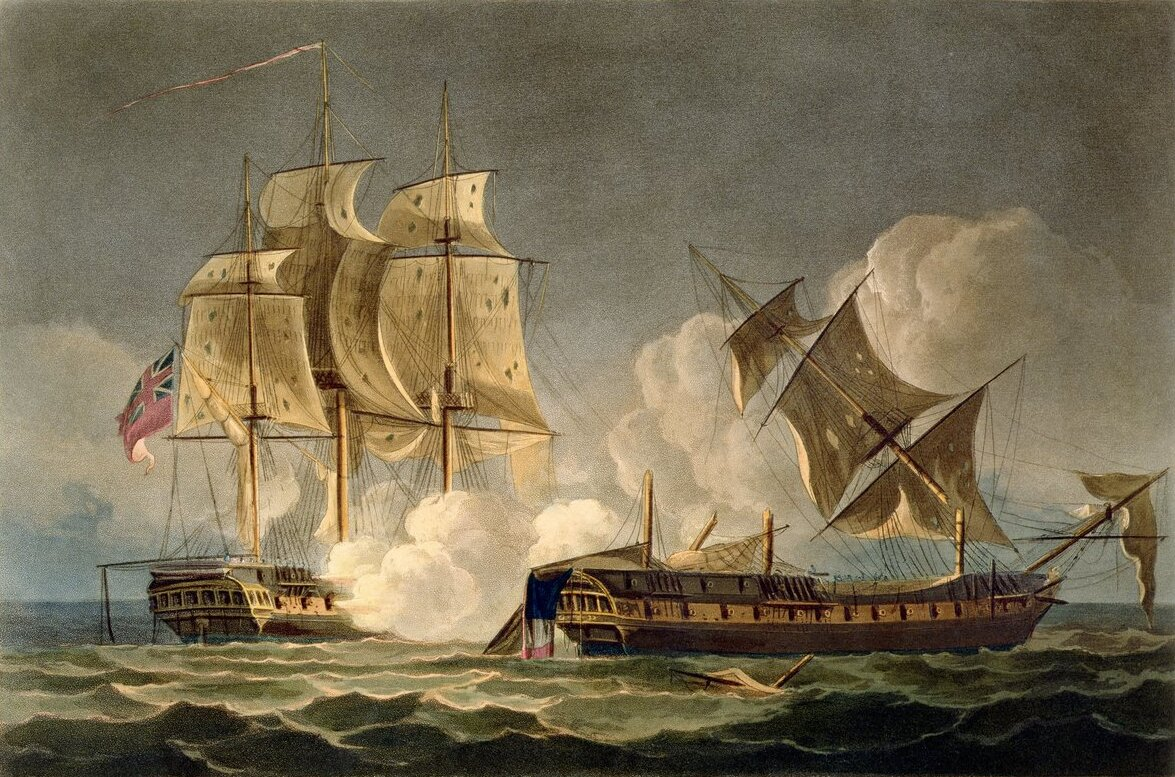
HMS Sybille raking Forte on 29 February 1799

In the evening of 27 February 1799, she captured the East Indiamen Endeavour and Lord Mornington; unbeknownst to Beaulieu-Leloup, the flashes of the battle were spotted by the 38-gun HMS Sybille, under Captain Edward Cooke, which closed in to investigate. She was spotted by the officers of Forte and identified as a British frigate, but Beaulieu-Leloup insisted that she was another East Indiaman and sent his crew to sleep for the night. It was only when Sybille's intent to intercept became evident that Beaulieu-Leloup called to battle stations; even then, he closed in and ordered a restrained attack, firing his guns one by one to test his opponent.

Cooke reserved his fire and manoeuvered into a raking position before delivering a broadside into the stern of Forte. In the damage, confusion and smoke caused by Sybille's fire, Forte began to mistakenly fire her starboard battery at one of her own prizes, leaving Sybille free to come about and deliver a second raking broadside from her other battery. The two frigates then began trading broadsides at close range, mortally wounding Cooke at 1:30; ten minutes later, Beaulieu-Leloup was killed by a cannonball.

After Beaulieu-Leloup's death, command of Forte passed to Lieutenant Vigoureux, who was killed himself at 2:00. Lieutenant Luco took over and attempted to manoeuver Forte, but her entire rigging collapsed, putting an end to her resistance. Sybille hailed to inquire whether Forte had struck, and ceased fire when this was confirmed. The next morning, Sybille hoisted a French flag to deceive the prize crew on Endeavour and Lord Mornington and recapture the ships, but the ruse was foiled and the two East Indiamen escaped.

== Notes and references ==
=== Bibliography ===
- Arnault, Antoine-Vincent (1827). Biographie nouvelle des contemporains [1787-1820] (in French). Vol. 4.
- Émerigon, Balthazard-Marie (1783). Traité des Assurances (in French). Vol. 2. J. Mossy.
- Garneray, Louis (2007). Voyages, aventures et combats: Mémoires (in French). La Découvrance. ISBN 9782842655471.
- Hennequin, Joseph François Gabriel (1835). Biographie maritime ou notices historiques sur la vie et les campagnes des marins célèbres français et étrangers (in French). Vol. 2. Paris: Regnault éditeur.
- Lardas, Mark (20 May 2013). "Sybille vs Forte". British Frigate vs French Frigate 1793–1814. Osprey Publishing. ISBN 9781780961347.
- Troude, Onésime-Joachim (1867). Batailles navales de la France (in French). Vol. 3. Challamel ainé.
- Fonds Marine. Campagnes (opérations; divisions et stations navales; missions diverses). Inventaire de la sous-série Marine BB4. Tome premier : BB4 1 à 482 (1790-1826)
- Gilbert Buti, Philippe Hrodej (dir.), Dictionnaire des corsaires et pirates, CNRS éditions, 2013
