= HMS Romney (1762) =

Fourth-rate ship of the line of the Royal Navy

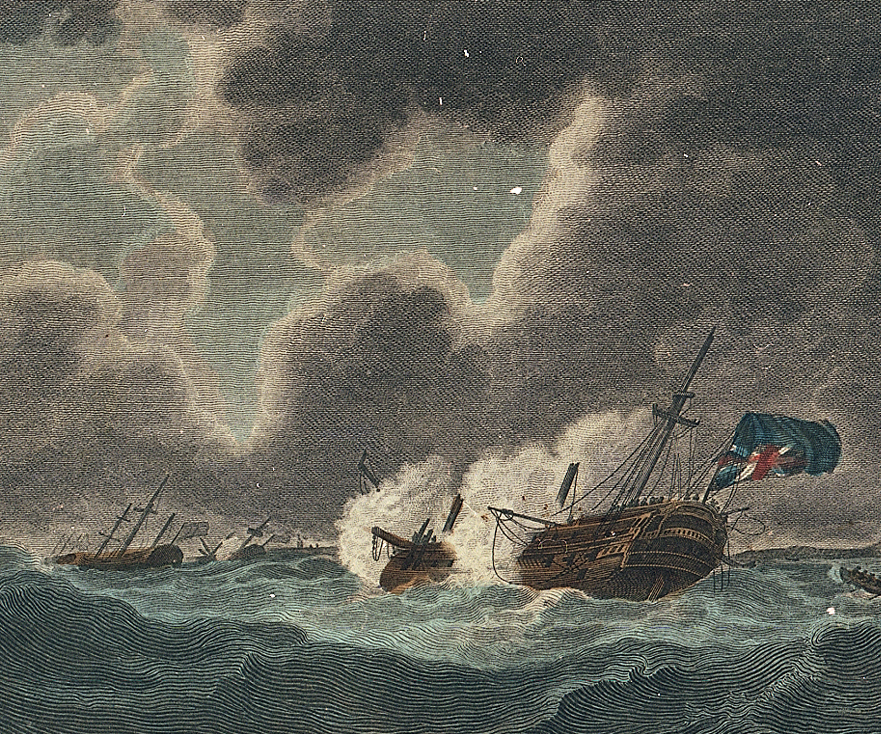
- Romney aground on 18–19 November 1804

History

Great Britain
- Name: Romney
- Ordered: 20 July 1759
- Builder: Woolwich Dockyard
- Laid down: 1 October 1759
- Launched: 8 July 1762
- Completed: By 4 September 1762
- Honours and awards: Naval General Service Medal with clasps: "Romney 17 June 1794"; "Egypt"
- Fate: Lost on 19 November 1804

General characteristics
- Class & type: 50-gun fourth rate
- Tons burthen: 1,02834/94 bm
- Length: 146 ft (44.5 m) (overall); 120 ft 10 in (36.8 m) (keel)
- Beam: 40 ft (12.2 m)
- Depth of hold: 17 ft 2 in (5.2 m)
- Propulsion: Sails
- Sail plan: Full-rigged ship
- Complement: 350
- Armament: Upper deck: 22 × 12-pounder guns; Lower deck: 22 × 24-pounder guns; QD: 4 × 6-pounder guns; Fc: 2 × 6-pounder guns

HMS Romney was a 50-gun fourth rate of the Royal Navy. She served during the American War of Independence, and the French Revolutionary and Napoleonic Wars in a career that spanned forty years. Five ships of the Royal Navy have been named HMS Romney. The origins of the name are from the town of New Romney, although it may be that the name entered the Royal Navy in honour of Henry Sydney, 1st Earl of Romney.

Launched in 1762, Romney spent most of her early career in North American waters, serving on the Newfoundland station, often as the flagship of the commander-in-chief. The ship was involved in the tensions leading up to the American Revolution when she was sent to support the Boston commissioners enforcing the Townshend Acts in 1768. Her actions involved impressing local sailors, confiscating a vessel belonging to John Hancock and providing a refuge for the unpopular commissioners when rioting broke out. She remained in American waters for part of the ensuing war, but towards the end operated in European waters after the French entry to the conflict.

Romney was laid up in ordinary or under repair for most of the subsequent years of peace, but returned to active service on the outbreak of war with Revolutionary France. She was in the Mediterranean supporting Lord Hood's occupation of Toulon in 1793, and remained there for several years. During this time she captured the 44-gun French Sibylle. Romney briefly returned to North America and then served in the Red Sea. Assigned to blockade the Dutch coast, Romney ran aground in November 1804 while sailing to join the fleet off Den Helder. She broke up after attempts to float her off failed.

== Design and construction ==
HMS Romney was built to a unique design by Sir Thomas Slade, which was based on William Bately's plans for HMS Warwick, but altered to make the ship shorter. She was ordered from Woolwich Dockyard on 20 July 1759, and laid down there on 1 October 1759. Built by Master Shipwright Israel Pownoll, she was launched on 8 July 1762, and completed by Joseph Harris by 4 September 1762. She was given the name Romney in November 1760.

== Career ==
=== North America ===
HMS Romney was commissioned in August 1762 under her first commander, Captain Robert Walsingham, but was paid off by February the following year. When she recommissioned in June 1763, it was under the command of Captain James Ferguson. Romney became the flagship of the commander of the North American station, Rear-Admiral Lord Colvill, and served in this capacity for the next three years. After a brief refit at Portsmouth, Romney recommissioned in March 1767 under Captain John Corner, as part of a squadron sent to North America under Samuel Hood. While serving off North America, Romney achieved a degree of notoriety after being sent to Boston Harbour to support the commissioners, who had asked Hood for help in enforcing the Townshend Acts. She arrived on 17 May 1768, but being short of men, Captain Corner began to impress seamen from the harbour. This was unpopular with the locals, who took to attacking the press gangs. Events escalated when the commissioners in the town ordered the seizure of the merchant vessel Liberty, which belonged to John Hancock. When sailors and marines from Romney attempted to seize the vessel, mobs attacked them and then turned on the commissioners. Many of the officials took refuge aboard Romney, before transferring to Castle William. These incidents heightened tensions that would eventually lead to the Boston Massacre in 1770.

=== American War of Independence ===
In 1770 Romney was briefly under Captain Hyde Parker, followed by Captain Robert Linzee in October that year. She was paid off in March 1771 and repaired and refitted at Deptford between 1773 and 1775, recommissioning under Captain George Elphinstone in April and becoming the flagship of the commander of the Newfoundland station, Rear-Admiral Robert Duff. Duff was succeeded by Vice-Admiral John Montagu the following year. Montagu retained Romney, by now under the command of Captain Elliott Salter, as his flagship. Salter was replaced by Captain George Montagu, the son of Vice-Admiral Montagu, in February 1777, who remained in command of the ship for the next two years.

Captain George Johnstone took over in early 1779 and served in the English Channel. On Johnstone's advancement to commodore in April that year, Captain Robert Nicholas took over as Romney's commander, though she remained part of Johnstone's squadron and flew his broad pendant. After a refit she returned to sea in 1779 as Sir John Ross's flagship, with Johnstone back as captain. She was involved in the operations in the Channel during the attempted Franco-Spanish invasion, after which she sailed to Lisbon. On 11 November 1779 she and HMS Tartar captured the 34-gun Spanish frigate Santa Margarita, which was subsequently taken into the navy as HMS Santa Margarita. With Johnstone's return to the post of commodore in December 1779, command passed to Captain Roddam Home, though Johnstone remained aboard. On 1 May 1780, Romney was involved in an incident with the cartel ship Sartine. Romney captured two French ships off Cape Finisterre in July, the 38-gun Artois on 1 July, and the 18-gun Perle five days later on 6 July. (Note: Perle was a corvette, launched on 30 August 1768. She had been armed with eighteen 6-pounder guns and had a crew of 100–140 men.)

Johnstone sailed to the East Indies with a convoy in March 1781, and Romney saw action at the Battle of Porto Praya on 16 April 1781. The battle was inconclusive, but on 21 July the ship was part of Johnstone's squadron which succeeded in capturing several Dutch East Indiamen in Saldanha Bay.

HMS Romney returned to Britain in November that year, at which point Captain Robert McDougall took command. By March 1783 she was sailing in the Western Approaches under Captain John Wickey and flying the broad pendant of Captain John Elliot. Wickey was replaced by Captain Thomas Lewes in July 1782, who went on to capture the 12-gun privateer Comte de Bois-Goslin off Ushant on 17 October 1782. Romney's next commander was Captain Samuel Osborn, from January to April 1783, after which she was paid off. After a period spent in ordinary, she underwent a repair and refit at Woolwich, eventually recommissioning in March 1792 under Captain William Domett, as the flagship of Rear-Admiral Samuel Goodall. She served in the Mediterranean until the outbreak of the French Revolutionary Wars, recommissioning under Captain William Paget in March 1793, and returning to the Mediterranean to take part in the British occupation of Toulon.

=== French Revolutionary Wars ===
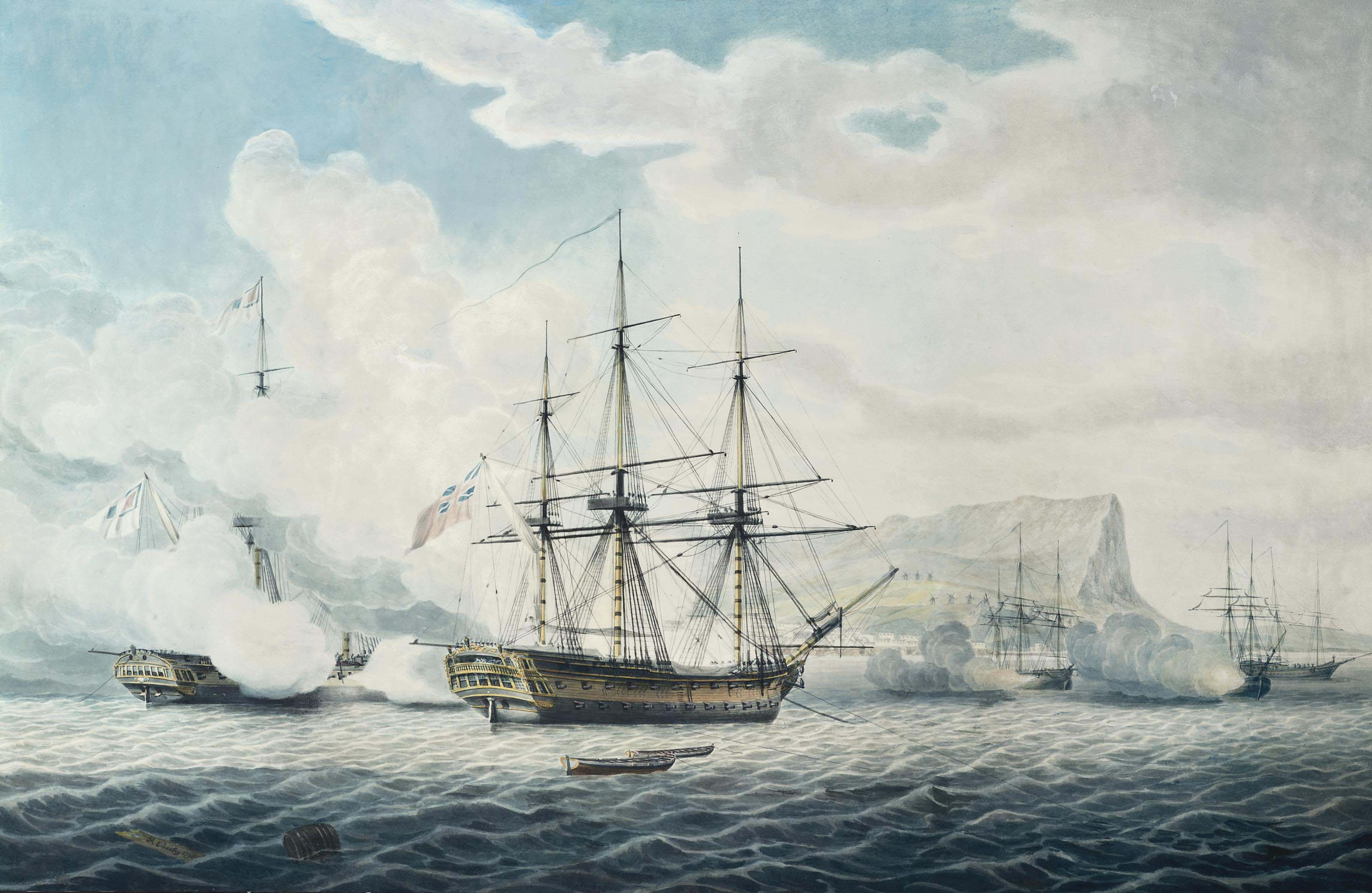
Romney (centre) at the Battle of Mykonos

While sailing off Mykonos on 17 June 1794, Paget spotted a French frigate in the harbour with three merchantmen. Paget approached and demanded that the French surrender. The French captain refused, whereupon Paget approached and the two exchanged broadsides for an hour and ten minutes. The French ship, which was discovered to be the 44-gun French frigate Sibylle, then struck her colours, having suffered casualties of 46 dead and 112 wounded, nine mortally. Romney had suffered casualties of eight dead and thirty wounded, two mortally in the Battle of Mykonos. In 1847 this action earned for the survivors the Naval General Service Medal with clasp "Romney 17 June 1794".

Command then passed to Captain Charles Hamilton. Henry Inman was briefly in command for her return to Britain in March 1795, whereupon Captain Frank Sotheron took over in June when Romney became the flagship of Vice-Admiral Sir James Wallace and returned to Newfoundland. The vessel spent the next several years sailing to and from Newfoundland, under the command of Captain Percy Fraser from June 1797, and then Captain John Bligh from July 1797 when Vice-Admiral William Waldegrave took over the station.

== Final years ==
Captain John Lawford took command in March 1798, and in August the following year Romney was assigned to Vice-Admiral Andrew Mitchell's squadron in Den Helder during the Vlieter Incident. Captain Sir Home Popham took over in August 1800 and sailed Romney to the Red Sea to support the British forces working to expel the French from Egypt. Because Romney served in the navy's Egyptian campaign (8 March to 2 September 1801), her officers and crew qualified for the clasp "Egypt" to the Naval General Service Medal that the Admiralty issued in 1847 to all surviving claimants.

In 1802 Romney was in the Red Sea, supporting General Baird's expedition to Egypt to help General Ralph Abercromby expel the French there. On 14 June the transport Calcutta wrecked on the Egyptian coast in the Red Sea. She was carrying 331 men of the 80th Regiment of Foot and 79 native Indian followers. Romney arrived the next day, as did two transports. Only Romney was able to get her boats out but they were able to rescue and deliver to the shore all but seven men who had died in an early attempt to reach shore. Popham left HMS Duchess of York to salvage anything that could be salvaged and then sailed to Suez from whence he dispatched Wilhelmina to pick up the troops on the 15th and carry them back to India.

After a refit at Chatham in 1803 Captain William Brown recommissioned her for operations on the African coast and in the West Indies. Captain John Colville replaced Brown in October 1804.

== Loss ==
On 18 November 1804 Romney sailed from Yarmouth to join the force under Rear-Admiral Russell blockading the Texel. A dispatch dated 28 November, printed in the newspapers reported the cause of her having run ashore is said to have been for mistaking three Americans which were on shore for part of (her) fleet. She ran aground when her pilots lost their way in thick fog while sailing off the Haak bank the following day. Attempts to float her off failed.

Realising that his ship was doomed, Colvill attempted to save his men and sent out two boats to seek help from nearby merchant vessels. One boat overturned while returning to Romney, drowning the boat's crew. The other made for shore, hoping to summon assistance from the Dutch authorities. The following morning, and with Romney fast breaking up, Colvill supervised the construction and launching of a number of rafts. As the final raft was being launched, seven boats approached from shore. On reaching Romney, the Dutch commander of the boats called on Colvill to surrender, promising that he would endeavour to save the British sailors. Colvill agreed and the Dutch rescued the remaining members of the crew. The total loss of life in the wreck was between nine and eleven men.

The Dutch conveyed the British to shore, where Dutch Admiral Kirkhurt treated them well. Kirkhurt then sent Colvill and eight of his officers back to join Russell.

As was standard practice, Colvill was subsequently tried by court martial aboard Africaine on 31 December for the loss of his ship. The court acquitted him, his officers and his men of all blame. The court found the cause of the accident to be the thick fog and the ignorance of the pilots. The court required the pilots to forfeit their pay, barred them from piloting any of His Majesty's ships, and imprisoned them for a time in the Marshalsea.
