= HMS Romney =

Five ships of the Royal Navy have been named HMS Romney. The origins of the name are from the town of New Romney, although it may be that the name entered the Royal Navy in honour of Henry Sydney, 1st Earl of Romney.

- HMS Romney (1694) was a 48-gun fourth rate launched in 1694 and wrecked in 1707.
- HMS Romney (1708) was a 54-gun fourth rate launched in 1708, sunk in 1721, refloated in the same year and sold in 1757.
- HMS Romney (1762) was a 50-gun fourth rate launched in 1762 and wrecked in 1804.
- HMS Romney (1815) was a 58-gun fourth rate launched in 1815. She became a troopship in 1820, a depot ship at Havana for freed slaves in 1837, and was sold in 1845.
- HMS Romney (J77) was a Bangor-class minesweeper launched in 1940 and sold in 1950.
