= Battle of Mykonos =

1794 battle of the War of the First Coalition

- Part of the War of the First Coalition
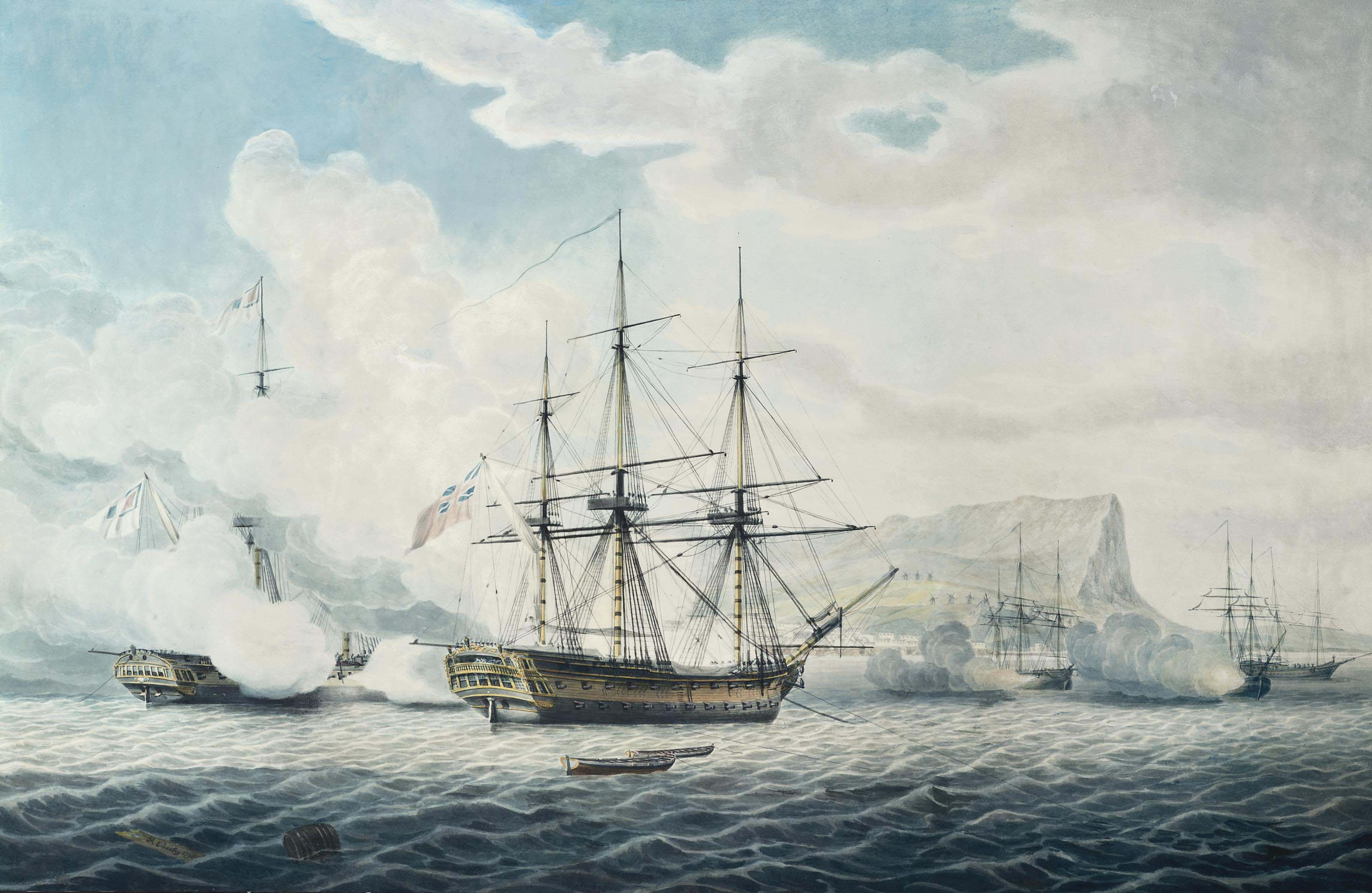
- 1795 painting of the battle
Date	17 June 1794
Location	Off Mykonos, Aegean Sea 37°27′N 25°19′E
Result	British victory

Belligerents
Great Britain	France

Commanders and leaders
William Paget	Jacques-Mélanie Rondeau (surrendered)

Strength
1 ship of the line	1 frigate 3 merchant ships

Casualties and losses
10 killed 28 wounded	55 killed 103 wounded 1 frigate captured 3 merchant ships captured

The Battle of Mykonos was a minor naval engagement fought in the main harbour of the Cycladic island of Mykonos on 17 June 1794 during the War of the First Coalition. A Royal Navy squadron led by fourth rate ship HMS Romney was escorting a convoy of eight merchant ships westwards through the Aegean Sea to Smyrna when the French frigate Sibylle was sighted at anchor in the harbour of Mykonos town with three French merchant ships. Ordering the convoy to continue with the rest of the squadron, Captain William Paget diverted the 50-gun Romney to the port and demanded the surrender of the 40-gun French ship and its convoy.

French Commodore Jacques-Mélanie Rondeau refused Paget's demands, and prepared to defend his ship. After some manoeuvring to ensure that the town was not within his firing arc, Paget brought Romney alongside the French frigate and for an hour and ten minutes the two vessels exchanged broadsides at close range. The engagement was hard fought and both ships suffered heavy casualties, but eventually the greater size of the two-decked Romney was too great for the smaller frigate and Rondeau surrendered. Sibylle was subsequently commissioned into the Royal Navy and participated in a celebrated battle in the Indian Ocean against the French frigate Forte in 1799.

== Background ==
In August 1793, seven months after Britain's entry into the French Revolutionary Wars, the Royal Navy's Mediterranean Fleet under Lord Hood seized control of Toulon, the principal naval base in Southern France, as well as the French Mediterranean Fleet anchored in the harbour. Although French Republican armies recaptured the city in December 1793 at the conclusion of the Siege of Toulon, a hastily organised operation succeeded in destroying half the fleet and damaging most of the remainder. Parts of the French fleet were at sea during the siege and thus avoided capture or destruction, particularly frigates operating against British commerce.

During 1794, as the French fleet underwent repairs in Toulon, these frigates remained in operation across the Mediterranean. Once such ship was the newly built 40-gun Hébé-class frigate Sibylle under Commodore Jacques-Mélanie Rondeau, which was detached to operate independently in the Aegean Sea. With the French fleet inactive, the Royal Navy focused their attention on the capture of Corsica, conducting sieges at Bastia and Calvi, with smaller forces sent out across the Mediterranean to escort convoys of merchant ships and hunt for the missing French frigates. One such force, sent in June 1794 from Naples to the Aegean Sea with a convoy of seven Dutch and one British merchant ships bound for Smyrna, consisted of the 50-gun fourth rate ship HMS Romney under Captain William Paget and three frigates HMS Inconstant, HMS Leda and HMS Tartar.

== Battle ==
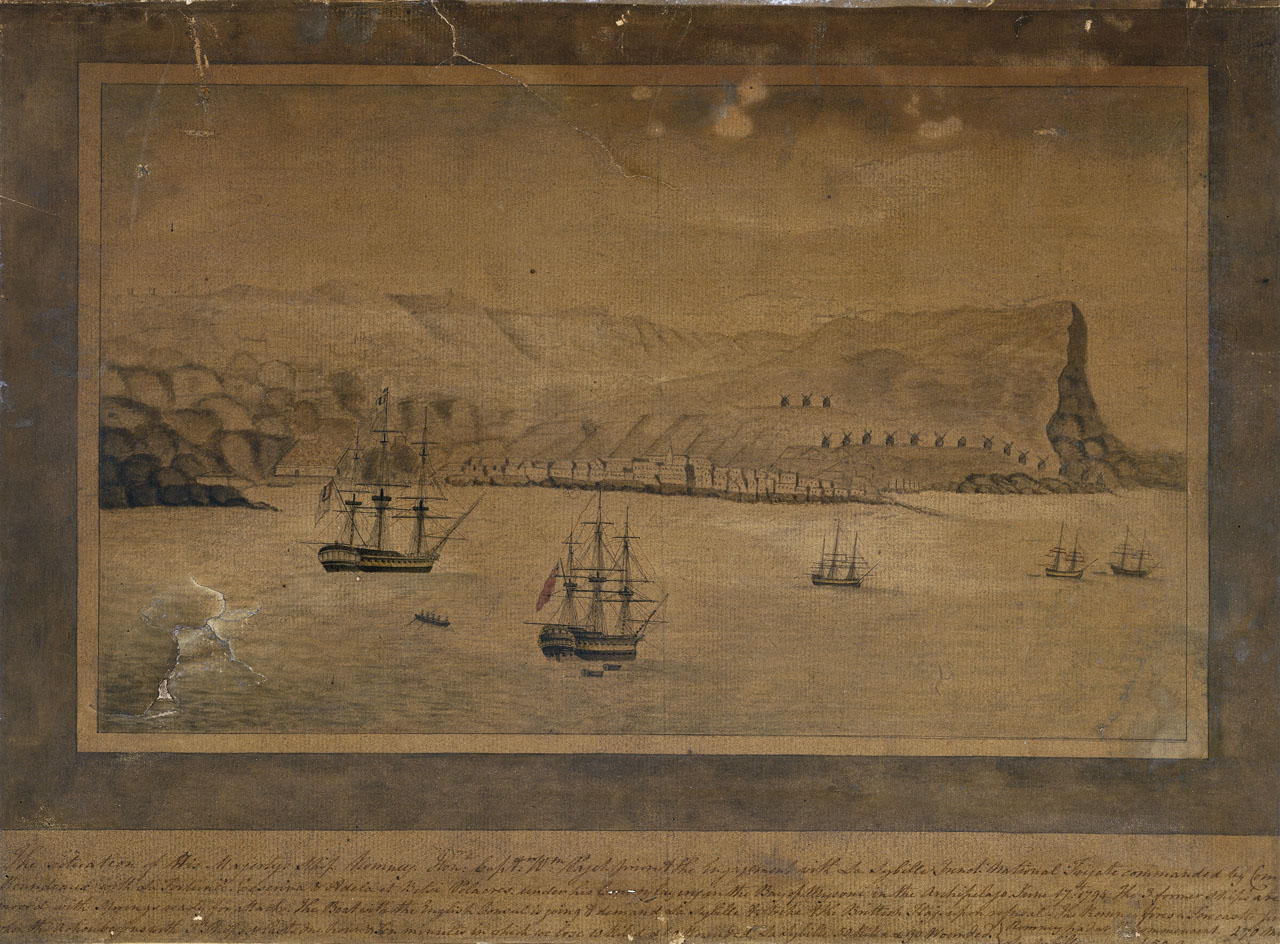
The Romney captures La Sybille 17 June 1794

On 16 June, off Kimolos, information reached the British convoy that a French frigate had been sighted near the Cycladic Islands of Tinos and Mykonos. Inconstant was detached to search for the enemy ship, without success. The following day, as the British convoy passed through the straits between the islands, a large warship was sighted at anchor in the harbour of Mykonos. Ordering the convoy to continue under the escort of the three frigates, Paget turned Romney south to investigate. The ship was discovered to be Sibylle, anchored alongside three French merchant ships and flying Rondeau's pennant. Paget's approach rendered escape impossible, and Rondeau remained at anchor as the larger British vessel entered the harbour and came to a halt just short of the French ship. Paget then sent a junior officer to Sibylle in a ship's boat with a request that Rondeau surrender his ship and convoy to prevent the loss of life that an engagement with the larger Romney would entail. Rondeau responded that he was well aware of his opponent's size and was not intimidated; he was prepared for battle and had sworn "never to strike his colours". Rondeau was subsequently reported to have learned before the engagement that Romney was operating with a reduced crew, only carrying 266 men of the 341 who should have been aboard, which compared unfavourably with the 380 men on board the French ship.

The junior officer returned with Rondeau's reply, the French commodore using the delay to manoeuvre Sibylle so that the ship lay directly between Romney's line of fire and the town of Mykonos. He believed that Paget would be unwilling to attack if there was a risk of causing damage and casualties to the town, which was under the control—as with the rest of the Cylades—of the neutral Ottoman Empire. This forced Paget to alter his own ship's position, warping Romney around so that the ship's broadside faced away from the town but could still be brought to bear against Sibylle. As he did so, he moved a cannon from the unengaged side of Romney to fill an empty gunport, the manoeuvre uninterrupted by Rondeau. At 13:00 the British ship was adequately positioned, Paget ordering "springs" on the anchor cables, a system of attaching the bow anchor that increased stability and allowed Romney to swing its broadside while stationary.

Satisfied with his preparations, Paget ordered his gunners to open fire on Sibylle and the French ship immediately returned fire. The frigates were anchored immobile in the bay before Mykonos and the engagement was fought broadside to broadside, with no opportunity to manoeuvere or avoid enemy shot. The battle continued until 14:10, Sibylle taking severe damage under fire from the larger Romney. With casualties rapidly mounting and some his men slipping away from their stations and swimming to shore, Rondeau recognised that defeat was inevitable and, despite his oath, surrendered his ship to prevent further bloodshed. Casualties on Sibylle totaled two officers and 44 sailors killed, nine more dying and 103 wounded. By contrast the losses on Romney were comparatively light, with eight killed and 30 wounded, two of whom subsequently died.

=== Order of battle ===
In this table, "Guns" refers to all cannon carried by the ship, including the maindeck guns which were taken into consideration when calculating its rate, as well as any carronades carried aboard. Broadside weight records the combined weight of shot which could be fired in a single simultaneous discharge of an entire broadside.

Ship	Commander	Navy	Guns	Tons	Broadside weight	Complement	Casualties		
Ship	Commander	Navy	Guns	Tons	Broadside weight	Complement	Killed	Wounded	Total
HMS Romney	Captain William Paget		54	1046bm	462 pounds (210 kg)	266	10	28	38
Sibylle	Commodore Jacques-Mélanie Rondeau	France official	44	1091bm	380 pounds (170 kg)	380	53	103	156
Source: Clowes, p. 486

== Aftermath ==
Although Romney officially carried ten more guns than Sibylle, their respective strengths were considerably closer than this indicates. Sibylle carried twenty-six 18-pounder long guns, sixteen 8-pounder long guns and two 36-pounder obusiers for a broadside weight of about 380 pounds (170 kg) (once one adjusts for the fact that the French pound was heavier than the British pound). This contrasts with a broadside weight of 414 pounds (188 kg) from Romney's main battery of 24-pounder long guns, which was therefore, in the opinion of British naval historian William James, "not, in reality, a decided overmatch for a 40-gun French frigate". He further considered that the two gun-decks on Romney were likely to have been the decisive factor in the outcome of the battle. Although James considered that the French fought hard, he did criticise Rondeau personally, stating "had the French captain foreborne to communicate the oath he had taken, not to strike his ship's colours, this engagement would have been yet more creditable than it was to the officers and men of Sibylle."

Following Rondeau's surrender Paget seized Sibylle and the three merchant ships from the harbour. The next morning Inconstant arrived in support and all of the ships rejoined the convoy and continued to Smyrna, arriving on 22 June. Sibylle was subsequently purchased into British service as HMS Sybille and considered, in the words of historian James Henderson, "one of the finest frigates in the Navy". In 1799, under the command of Captain Edward Cooke, who had distinguished himself at the siege of Toulon, Sibylle fought a famous action in the Indian Ocean against the French frigate Forte. By the battle's end, Forte had been captured and Cooke mortally wounded. More than five decades after the battle, the Admiralty recognised the action with the clasp "ROMNEY 17 JUNE 1794" attached to the Naval General Service Medal, awarded upon application to all British participants still living in 1847.

== Notes ==
1. A number of nineteenth century British sources refer to Mykonos by its Italian name: Miconi.

== Bibliography ==
- Brenton, Edward Pelham (1837) [1825]. The Naval History of Great Britain, Vol. I. London: C. Rice. "edward pelham brenton."
- Clowes, William Laird (1997) [1900]. The Royal Navy, A History from the Earliest Times to 1900, Volume IV. London: Chatham Publishing. ISBN 1-86176-013-2.
- Gardiner, Robert, ed. (2001) [1996]. Fleet Battle and Blockade. London: Caxton Editions. ISBN 1-84067-363-X.
- Henderson CBE, James (1994) [1970]. The Frigates. Leo Cooper. ISBN 0-85052-432-6.
- James, William (2002) [1827]. The Naval History of Great Britain, Volume 1, 1793–1796. London: Conway Maritime Press. ISBN 0-85177-905-0.
- Tracy, Nicholas, ed. (1998). The Naval Chronicle, Volume 1, 1793–1798. London: Chatham Publishing. ISBN 1-86176-091-4.
- Woodman, Richard (2001). The Sea Warriors. London: Constable Publishers. ISBN 1-84119-183-3.
