= French frigate Sibylle (1791) =

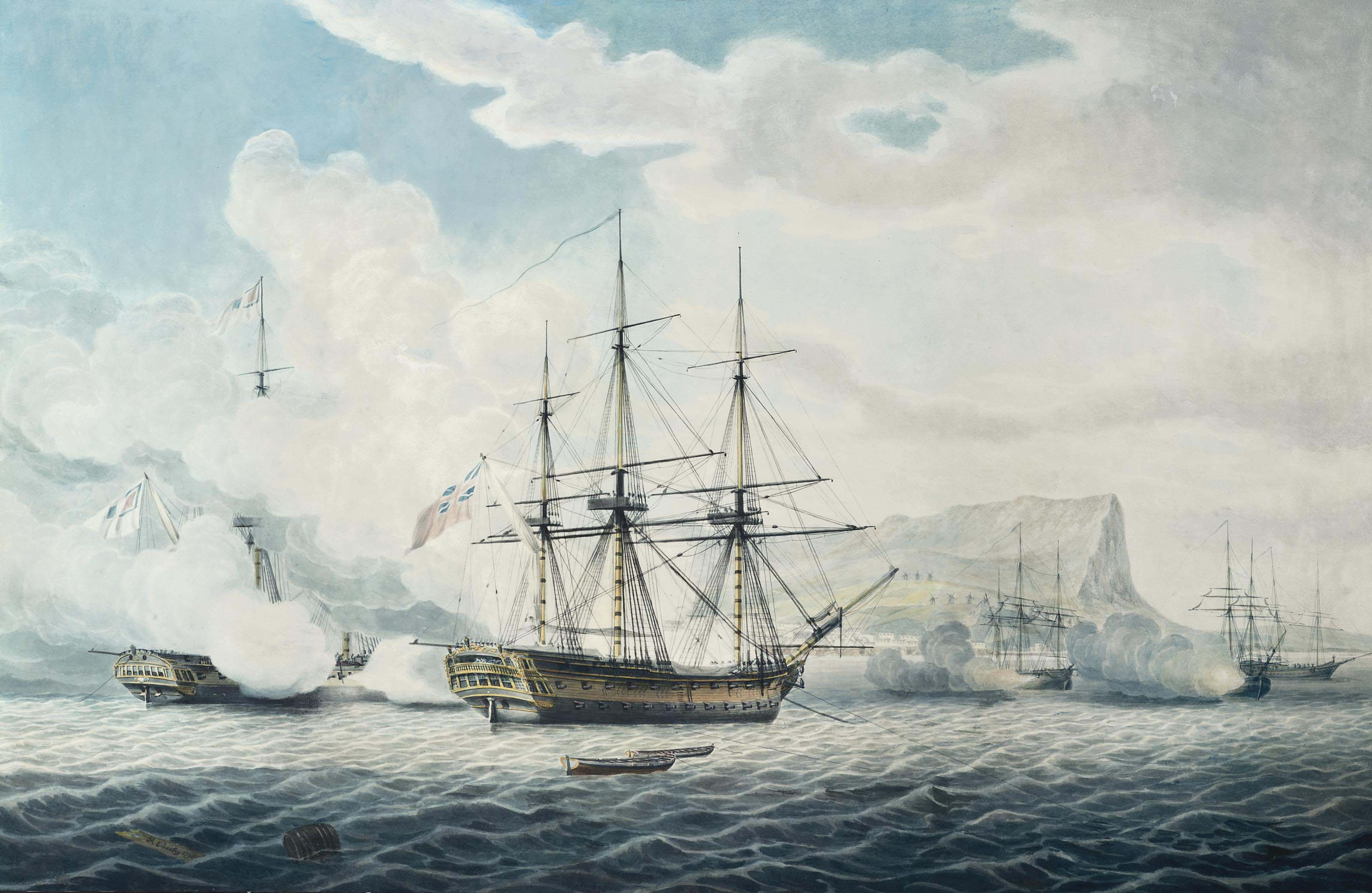
- Sibylle (left) at the Battle of Mykonos

History

France
- Name: Sibylle
- Namesake: Sybil
- Builder: Toulon
- Laid down: April 1790
- Launched: 30 August 1791
- In service: May 1792
- Captured: 17 June 1794

Great Britain
- Name: Sybille
- Acquired: 17 June 1794
- Decommissioned: 1833
- Honours and awards: Naval General Service Medal with clasp "Sybille 28 Feby. 1799"
- Fate: Sold 7 August 1833

General characteristics
- Class & type: Hébé-class frigate
- Displacement: 1,350 tonneaux
- Tons burthen: 700 port tonneaux
- Length: 46.3 m (152 ft)
- Beam: 11.9 m (39 ft)
- Draught: 5.5 m (18 ft)
- Complement: 297
- Armament: French service: Gundeck: 26 × 18-pounder long guns; Fc and QD: 8 × 8-pounder long guns; British service: 1794: Gundeck: 28 × 18-pounder guns; QD: 12 9-pounder guns; Fc: 4 9-pounder guns; 1799: Gundeck: 4 × 9-pounder guns and 12 × 32-pounder carronades; Fc: 2 × 9-pounder guns and 6 × 32-pounder carronades; Later: QD: 8 × 9-pounder guns + 6 × 32-pounder carronades

Sibylle was a 38-gun Hébé-class frigate of the French Navy. She was launched in 1791 at the dockyards in Toulon and placed in service in 1792. After the 50-gun fourth rate HMS Romney captured her in 1794, the British took her into service as HMS Sybille. (Note: Why the Admiralty reversed the positions of the "i" and the "y" in spelling her name is not clear, but this aberrant spelling persisted over several later Royal Navy vessels.) She served in the Royal Navy until disposed of in 1833. While in British service, Sybille participated in three notable single-ship actions, in each case capturing a French vessel. On anti-slavery duties off West Africa from July 1827 to June 1830, Sybille captured many slavers and freed some 3,500 slaves. She was sold in 1833 in Portsmouth.

== French service ==
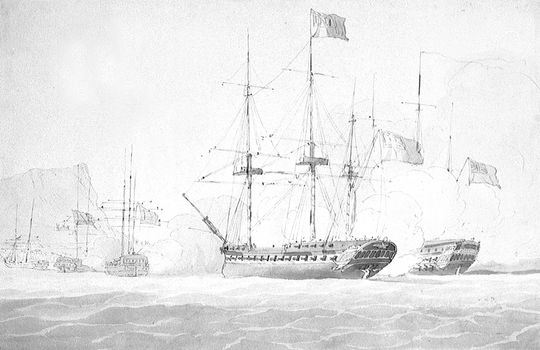
Capture of Sybille by Romney

From 23 April 1790 to October–December 1792, Sibylle escorted a convoy and transferred funds from Toulon to Smyrna, first under Capitaine de vaisseau (CV) Grasse-Briançon and then CV de Venel. From March 1793 to January 1794, under CV Rondeau, she escorted convoys between Toulon and Marseille and then she moved to the Levant station. She cruised the Aegean Sea, and in June 1794 she was escorting a convoy from Candia to Mykonos.

On 17 June, as Sybille was anchored in Miconi along with three merchantmen bound for Cadiz, a British convoy escorted by HMS Romney, under Captain Paget, and three frigates appeared. Romney approached and demanded that Sibylle hoist a white flag, to which Rondeau retorted that he could not fly another flag than that of the Republic.

Romney opened fire, and after 90 minutes of gunnery exchanges, Sibylle struck to her much more powerful opponent. Paget took possession of Sibylle and the merchantmen, but put the crew and Rondeau ashore. Sibylle was taken into British service as HMS Sybille. (Note: In 1847 this action earned for the survivors the Naval General Service Medal with clasp "Romney 17 June 1794".)

== British service in the French Revolutionary and Napoleonic Wars ==
In 1798, now named Sybille, the ship served off the Philippines, participating in the bloodless raid on Manila. In December, she gave chase to the privateer Clarisse, under Robert Surcouf. Clarisse escaped by throwing eight guns overboard.

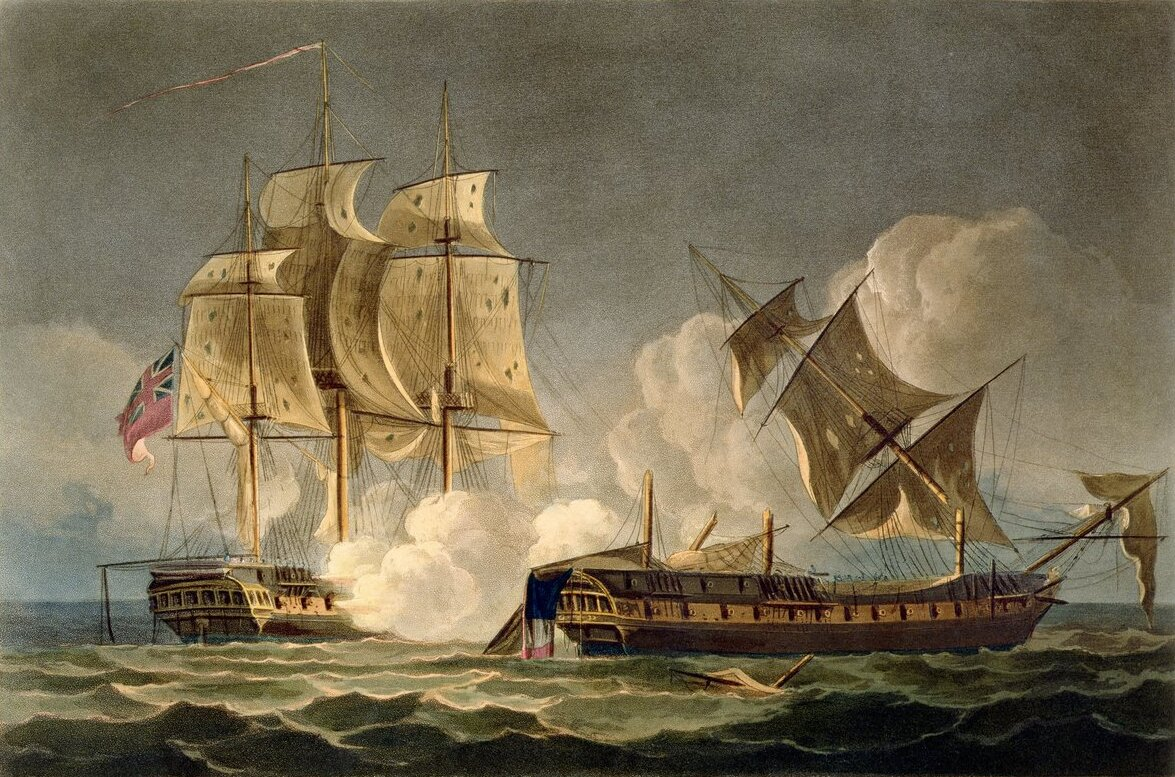
Sybille fighting Forte

In February 1799, while under the command of Captain Edward Cooke, Sybille patrolled the Indian Ocean in a hunt for the French frigate Forte, under Captain Beaulieu-Leloup. The ships met on 28 February in the Balasore Roads in the Bay of Bengal at the action of 28 February 1799. Sybille took Forte by surprise and captured her, as Forte's captain mistook Sybille for a merchantman. (Note: This was not by chance. Cooke had disguised her as a merchantman precisely for that purpose in a tactic that the British would reuse in World War I with the Q-ships.) Cooke was wounded in the action and died at Calcutta on 23 May, aged 26. Though his grave is in Calcutta, the East India Company erected a monument to him in Westminster Abbey in appreciation of the benefit to British trade of his capture of Forte. In all, Sybille lost five dead and 17 wounded. In 1847, the Admiralty authorized the issuance of the Naval General Service Medal with clasp "Sybille 28 Feby. 1799" to all remaining survivors of the action.

In June 1799, Sybille came under the command of Captain Charles Adam. On 23 August 1800, Sybille, with Daedalus, Centurion, and Braave, captured a Dutch brig. The Royal Navy took her into service as Admiral Rainier. The British ships had entered Batavia Roads and captured five Dutch armed vessels and destroyed 22 other vessels. Sybille alone apparently captured one brig of six guns, four proas armed with swivels, four proas armed with between three 8-pounder and three 4-pounder guns, and some 21 unarmed proas, of which five were lost. How many of these, if any, are among the vessels reported as being taken in the Batavia Roads is not clear.

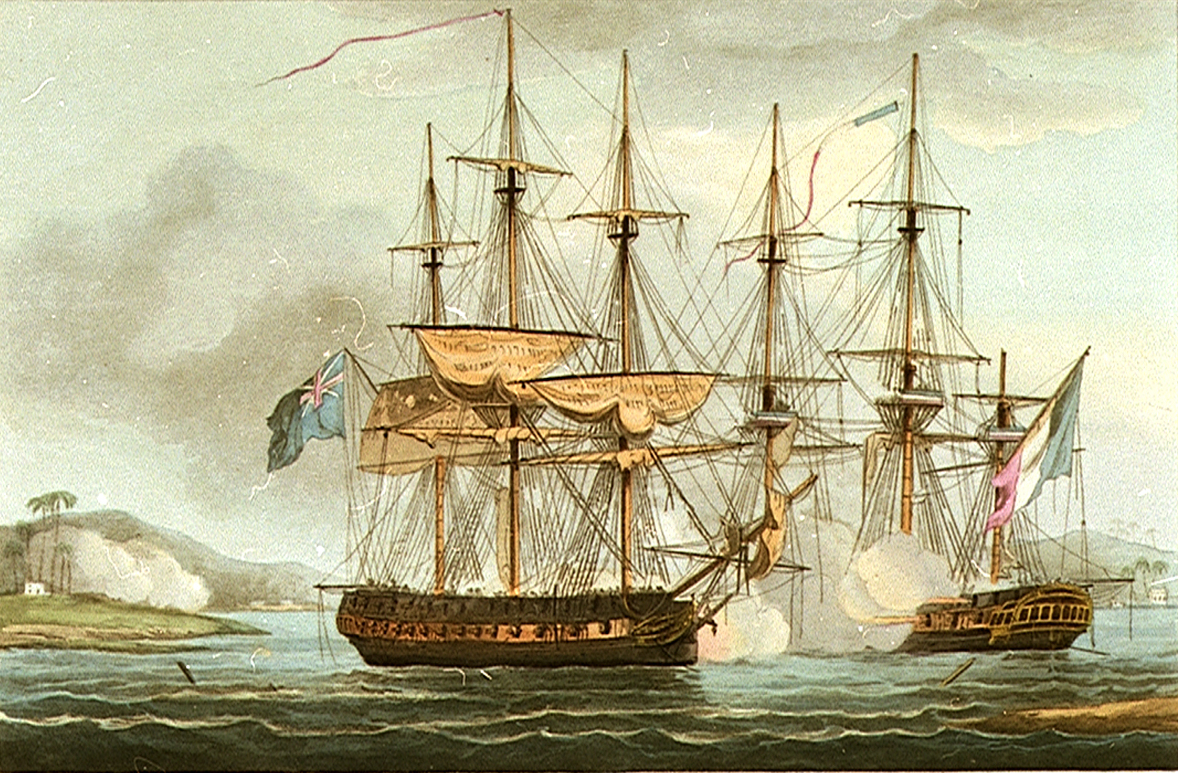
HMS Sybille capturing Chiffonne

On 19–20 August 1801, in the Roads of Mahé, Seychelles, Sybille captured the French frigate Chiffonne, under the command of Capitaine de Vaisseau Guieyesse. Chiffonne had captured the Portuguese corvette Andorinha off the coasts of Brazil on 5 May, and the East Indiaman Bellona in the Madagascar Channel on 16 June. (Later, from 23 May 1803 to 1805, Charles Adams would command Chiffonne.)

In 1803, the insurance industry in Calcutta presented Captain Charles Adam of Sybille, and Captain Hart, of HCS Mornington, and with valuable swords for having captured French warships and privateers.

On 3 May 1807, under Captain Robert Winthrop, Sybille captured the French 4-gun privateer Oiseau in the English Channel.

Sybille, under the command of Capt. Clotworthy Upton, participated in Battle of Copenhagen in 1807, where she bombarded the city. The battle resulted in the British capturing the Danish Fleet.

On 25 January 1808, while on the Home station, Sibylle captured the French privateer lugger Grand Argus. Grand Argus was pierced for 12 guns but carried only four. She and her crew of 41 men were under the command of Michael Daguinet. She was on her first cruise from Granville but had made no captures in the three days she had been out.

Then on 16 August, Sybille captured the French brig-corvette Espiègle, later recommissioned in the Royal Navy as Electra. Espiègle arrived in Cork on the evening of 31 August.

In the summer of 1809 Sybille cruised off the Greenland ice. Her role was to protect the whalers from privateers and then to escort them back to Britain.

In subsequent years she captured several privateers. In October 1810 she captured the French privateer Edouard off the coast of Ireland. Edouard, under Guillaume Moreau, was armed with 14 guns and had a crew of 90 men. She was eight days out of Abrevarake.

On 28 January 1812 Sybille was in company with Surveillante and Spitfire, when Surveillante captured the American ship Zone.

On 10 May Sybille captured the French privateer Aigle at 49°6′N 8°22′W. Aigle was the former Weymouth to Guernsey packet Chesterfield. Aigle, of 61 men under the command of Captain Alexander Black, had thrown eight of her 14 guns overboard while trying to escape Sybille. Aigle was three days out of Bennodet, near Quimper, and had earlier captured the brig Alicia as Alicia was sailing from Bristol to Gibraltar. (Note: A French privateer lugger had captured Earl of Chesterfield Packet in late 1811 as she was sailing to Guernsey.) Aigle had captured Alicia Hill, Le Brun, master, at 48°26′N 9°58′W. HMS Rota had recaptured Alicia Hill, which arrived on 19 July at Plymouth. Aigle arrived at Cork on 15 July.

On 2 August Sybille detained and sent into Cork Perseverance of New York.

Lastly, on 5 February 1813 Sybille captured the French privateer Brestois at sea. Brestois was a schooner armed with 14 guns and carrying a crew of 121 men. (Note: Brestois was commissioned at Saint-Malo in October 1810. She made three cruises. Her first cruise occurred under Aimable-Parfait Sauveur with 106 men and 14 guns from October 1810 to April 1811. She made two more between October 1811 and March 1813 under Julien-Marie-Joseph Gallais, with 105 to 132 men and four 6-pounder guns and ten 6-pounder carronades. Sybille captured Brestois on 5 February 1813. Newspaper accounts gave Brestois's armament as four guns and ten carronades, all 9-pounders, and 109 or 121 men.) Sybille sent her into Cork too.

== Post-war service ==
Captain Sir John Pechell took command of Sybille on 1 July 1823 and fitted her out for service in the Mediterranean. She sailed in October and proceeded to spend three years protecting the Ionian Islands and suppressing piracy.

A year later, Sybille enforced an indemnity on the government of the First Hellenic Republic for an attack on a Turkish vessel at Ithaca in December 1823 in violation of the neutrality of the United States of the Ionian Islands. On 5 October 1824, Pechell seized three Greek schooners in the harbour of Nauplia (Polyxenes of eight guns and 69 men; San Niccolo of 10 guns and 73 men; and Bella Poula of eight guns and 37 men) as a provision until the indemnity of 40,000 dollars was forthcoming. The ship took the prizes to Zante and the prisoners to Corfu.

In October 1825, boats from Sybille and Medina, Captain Timothy Curtis, found a Greek pirate mistico and her prize at anchor in a cove at Catacolo. The British handed the Ionian prize over to the authorities in Zante and sent the mistico to Corfu.

Sybille's next notable action occurred when she attacked a pirate lair at Kaloi Limenes at the end of June 1826. Sybille sent in her boats but they were unsuccessful. The British suffered some 13 dead and 31 wounded, five of whom died subsequently. Gunfire from Sybille killed many pirates until the pirates traded a Royal Marine they had captured from one of the boats for a cease-fire. Sybille left the island though some time later a Turkish brig chased the pirates' remaining boat ashore in Anatolia, thus ending that threat.

== Suppressing the slave trade ==
In 1822 Sybille was in the West Indies. That year her tender, the 5-gun schooner Speedwell, shared with the frigate Tyne in the capture of two pirate schooners on 5 November, Union and Constantia (alias Espereanza), and in the destruction of Hawke and Paz.

From 4 December 1826 until 1830, Sybille was part of the West Africa Squadron, which sought to suppress the slave trade. There she was under the command of Commodore Francis Augustus Collier.

On 6 September 1827, Sybille captured the Brazilian ship Henriqueta (also Henri Quatre), with 569 slaves on board, of whom 546 survived to be liberated in Sierra Leone. In December the Admiralty purchased Henriquetta for £900 as a tender to Sybille and renamed her HMS Black Joke. Black Joke would go on to be one of the most successful anti-slavery vessels in the squadron.

On 14 March 1828 Sybille was reported to have captured three slave vessels: possibly a Dutch schooner with 272 slaves, a Spanish schooner with 282 slaves, and Hope, former tender to Maidstone, with a cargo on board for the purchase of slaves. When Sybille arrived at Sierra Leone on 17 May for refitting in preparation for a passage to Ascension Island, she reported that since she arrived on the station in July 1827 she had freed over 1100 slaves.

In 1829, 204 men died on board Eden from yellow fever. To convince the crew of Sybille that the fever was not contagious, her surgeon, Robert McKinnal, drank a glassful of black vomit from an ailing crew member.

Between February and March 1829 Sybille captured a Brazilian brig, and her tenders captured the slave schooner Donna Barbara. By 11 April 1829, Sybille claimed to have released over 3,900 slaves in the previous 22 months. On 29 April she captured a Spanish schooner with 291 slaves on board. Then on 12 May she sent in to the prize court a schooner with 185 slaves on board.

Sybille also seized and condemned a number of vessels for illicitly trafficking in slaves. On 11 October it was the brigantine Tentadora and on 1 November the brigantine Nossa Senhora da Guia, with 310 slaves, of whom 238 survived. On 30 January 1830 Sybille seized and condemned a third, unnamed vessel. Then on 15 January she took Umbelino, with 377 slaves of whom only 163 survived, and eight days later, Primera Rosalia, with 282 slaves, of whom 242 survived. She also captured a brigantine from Lagos after a 27-hour chase; the vessel turned out to have 282 slaves on board. Her last capture occurred on 1 April when she captured Manzanares. Sybille finally returned to Portsmouth from the coast of Africa on 26 June and was paid off.

== Fate ==
Between January 1830 and July 1831 she was fitted as a lazaretto for Dundee, Scotland. She was eventually sold to a Mr. Henry for £2,460 on 7 August 1833.
