= French frigate Forte (1794) =

42-gun frigate

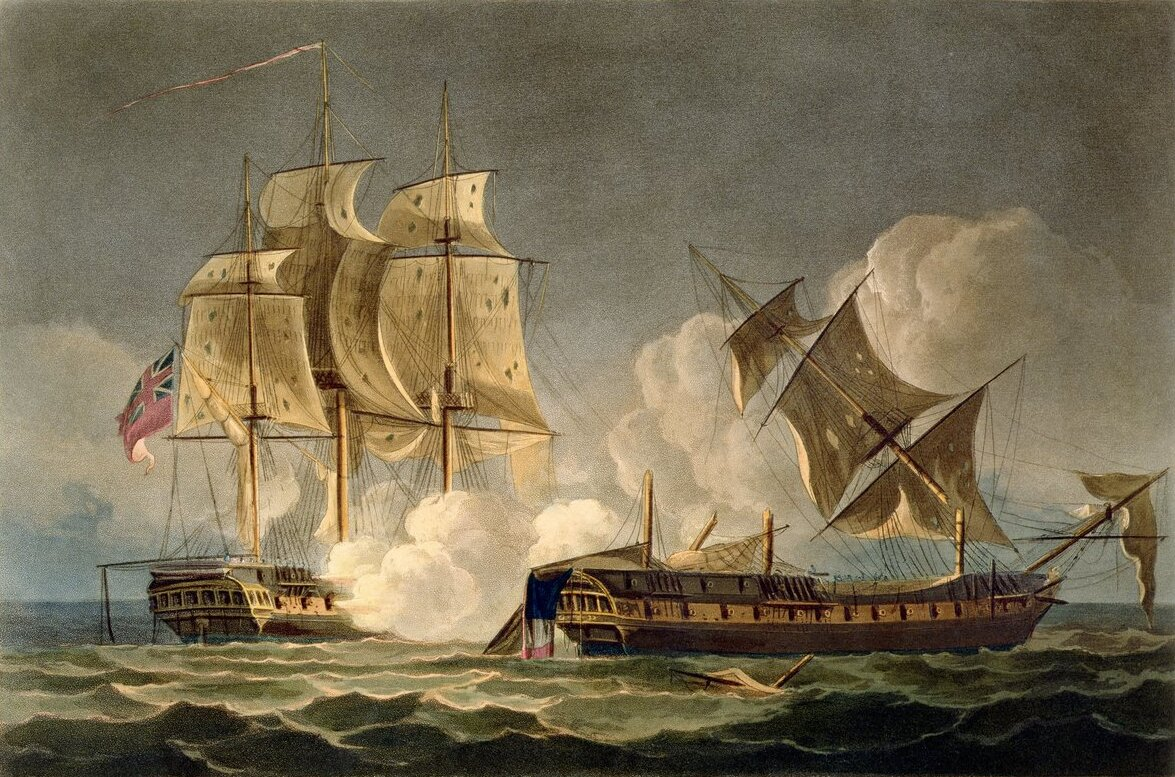
- Forte (right) at the action of 28 February 1799

History

France
- Name: Forte
- Ordered: 5 July 1794
- Builder: Lorient
- Laid down: 30 May 1794
- Launched: 26 September 1794
- Commissioned: November 1794
- Captured: 1 March 1799, by the Royal Navy

Great Britain
- Name: Forte
- Acquired: 1 March 1799
- Fate: Wrecked 29 January 1801

General characteristics
- Type: 42-gun Forte-class frigate
- Tonnage: 1,020 tonnes
- Length: 52 m (170 ft 7 in)
- Beam: 13 m (42 ft 8 in)
- Draught: 6.2 m (20 ft 4 in)
- Sail plan: Full-rigged ship
- Armament: 28 × 24-pounder long guns; 10 × 8-pounder long guns; 4 × 36-pounder carronades

Forte was a 42-gun Forte-class frigate of the French Navy.

== Career ==
=== French service ===
Launched on 26 September 1794 and commissioned two months later under Commander Beaulieu-Leloup, Forte was part of a large frigate squadron under contre-amiral Sercey, also comprising Prudente, Régénérée, Vertu, Seine, Cybèle and Preneuse. The division sailed to Ile de France to raid commerce in the Indian Ocean.

On 15 May 1796 Forte, Vertu, Seine, and Régénérée were cruising between St Helena and the Cape of Good Hope hoping to capture British East Indiamen when they encountered the British whaler Lord Hawkesbury on her way to Walvis Bay. The French took off her crew, except for two seamen and a boy, and put Forte's fourth officer and 13-man prize crew aboard Lord Hawkesbury with orders to sail to Île de France. On her way there one of the British seamen, who was at the helm, succeeded in running her aground on the east coast of Africa a little north of the Cape, wrecking her. There were no casualties, but the prize crew became British prisoners.

Forte took part in the action of 8 September 1796, where the frigates drove off two British 74-guns.

In 1797, Forte and Prudente were sent to Batavia to ferry troops. Command of Forte was given to Captain Ravenel. Against the wishes of Sercey, General Malartic restored Beaulieu to command. (Note: Hennequin (p.210) proved a glimpse of Sercey's reluctance by referring to Beaulieu-Leloup as an "inept old man".)

While operating in the Bay of Bengal in early 1799, Forte captured a number of vessels. These were (with their master's name in parentheses): Recovery (M'Kinley), Chance (Johnson). Yarmouth (Beck), Endeavour (Eastwick), Earl Mornington (Cook), and Surprize (Moore). Forte also captured two unnamed vessels. She made a cartel of one of her captures and sent her into Madras.

On 24 February 1799, Forte encountered the East Indiaman Osterley. A sharp single-ship action developed, with Osterley losing four men killed and 13 wounded before she struck. Forte spent two days or so transferring some of Osterley's cargo before he let her and her crew proceed. Some accounts state that he released her as a cartel for an exchange of prisoners. Lloyd's List reported that the galley Surprize participated in the engagement but escaped.

==== Battle against HMS Sybille ====
On 1 March 1799, off Bengal, Forte chased and captured two merchantmen. Around 22:00, as Forte sailed to take possession of her prize, a sail was detected leeward, which Beaulieu-Leloup deemed to be another merchantman in spite of the suspicions of his officers. The crew of Forte went to their sleeping quarters, and it took some time to realise that the strange ship was closing in and to call the crew to Battle Stations. When readied, Forte turned about and recognized the ship to be the 38-gun HMS Sybille, under Captain Edward Cooke.

At 12:15, Forte opened fire with a few shots, which were left unanswered until she came down the side of Sybille, at which point the British frigate delivered a full broadside, turned about and raked Forte with a second broadside. In the confusion of the battle, the gun crews of Forte were not advised that Sybille had circled around to starboard, and they kept firing their port guns at a ship whose silouhette could be seen through the smoke, but which was actually one of the prizes. After some time, the mistake was realised and the starboard battery was manned; however, as part of the crew of Forte had been dispatched to man her prizes, Forte was too short-handed to man her forecastle guns.

At 1:40, a cannonball killed Captain Beaulieu-Leloup and command of Forte passed to Lieutenant Vigoureux. Around the same time, Captain Cooke was mortally wounded on Sybille and relinquished his own command. Vigoureux was killed at 2:00, and Lieutenant Luco took command. By that time, only four guns were still firing. Luco attempted to manoeuver, but the heavily damaged rigging collapsed at 2:25. Sybille inquired whether it was to be understood that Forte had struck her colours, and ceased fire when this was confirmed.

=== British service ===
Forte was taken into British service as HMS Forte. She was under the command of Captain Hardyman when she was wrecked on 29 January 1801 off Jeddah, in the Red Sea. She was entering the port with a pilot, William Briggs, when she struck a rock. Briggs knew of the rock, which was visible the whole time, but failed to issue any orders. Hardyman eventually ordered the helmsman to turn, but it was too late. Forte reached the shore and ran up the beach, where she capsized. The court martial board admonished Briggs to be more circumspect in the future and penalized him one year's seniority as a master.

Still, as her ship's company had served in the navy's Egyptian campaign (8 March to 8 September 1801), her officers and crew qualified for the clasp "Egypt" to the Naval General Service Medal, which the Admiralty authorised in 1850 for all surviving claimants.

== Post-script ==
In 1811 French naval engineers examined USS Constitution while she was visiting Cherbourg. The engineers compared the design of the American frigate to that of the lost Forte.
