= Richery's expedition =

Naval operation in the French Revolutionary Wars

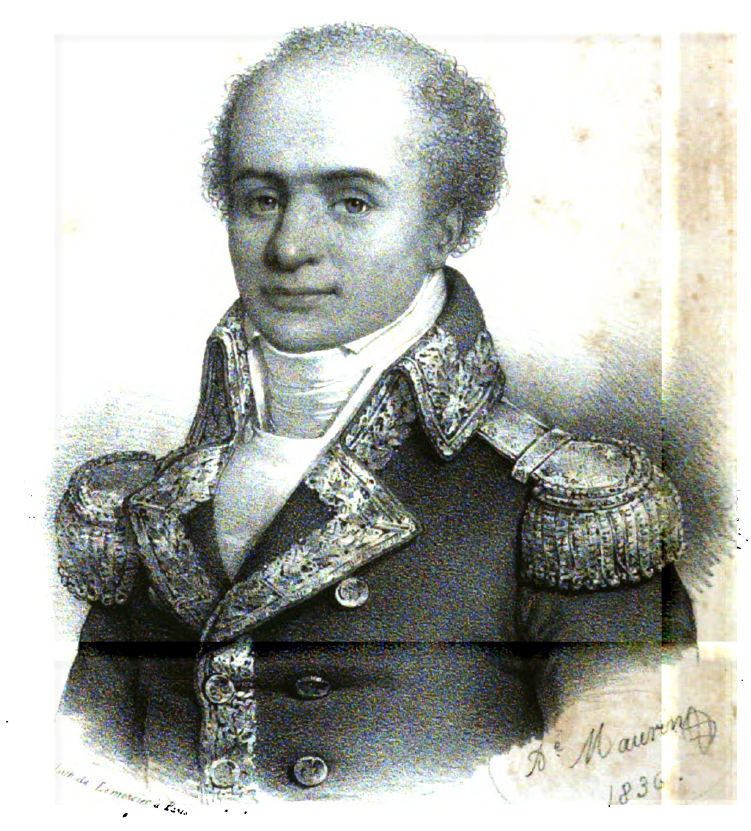
Joseph de Richery, the operation's commander

Richery's expedition was a French naval operation during 1795 and 1796 as part of the French Revolutionary Wars. The operation was led by Commodore Joseph de Richery and comprised two separate cruises; the first was an operation off Cádiz in Southern Spain in which Richery attacked and defeated a large British merchant convoy with a weak escort, taking many prizes. Forced to anchor at Cádiz, the French squadron was subsequently blockaded in the port for almost a year. Richery was enabled to escape in August 1796 by a Spanish fleet, and went on to attack British fisheries off Newfoundland and Labrador before returning to France having inflicted severe damage to British Atlantic trade.

The operation was launched in the autumn of 1795, following a series of defeats for the French Mediterranean Fleet. Responding to a request from the Atlantic fleet for reinforcements, a squadron of ships of the line was sent from Toulon, with orders to raid British shipping in the Caribbean and North Atlantic and then return to Brest. Command of the squadron was given to Commodore Joseph de Richery in the 80-gun Victoire. The squadron evaded British pursuit, and on 7 October off Cape St Vincent on the coast of Portugal Richery discovered a large British convoy from the Eastern Mediterranean. Richery attacked the convoy, defeated the escort and captured a British ship of the line and 30 merchant ships, carrying his prizes into the friendly neutral port of Cádiz.

Richery was then subject to a blockade by a British squadron until July 1796, when it was temporarily lifted. Taking advantage of the absence of British warships, Richery sailed under cover of a Spanish fleet, separating once at sea and sailing across the Atlantic to the valuable fishing grounds off the British colonies of Newfoundland and Maritime Canada. In a series of devastating raids on undefended fishing communities and shipping, Richery was able to destroy or capture most of the region's fishing infrastructure and more than a hundred British ships before returning to France in November, evading pursuit by British blockade squadrons.

== Background ==
The French Navy had suffered a series of losses in the first years of the French Revolutionary Wars, with substantial numbers of ships captured or destroyed at the Siege of Toulon, Glorious First of June and the Croisière du Grand Hiver. In the spring of 1795 the Atlantic fleet lost three more ships at the Battle of Groix and three more were lost in the Mediterranean at the battles of Genoa and Hyères Islands. In an effort to rebalance these losses and inflict economic damage on British commerce, orders were sent for a squadron from the Mediterranean Fleet to sail to the Caribbean, land troops at Saint-Domingue, attack shipping off Jamaica and then destroy the cod fisheries off Newfoundland and the Canadian Maritimes. This force would then return to Brest via the Azores, in order to augment the Atlantic Fleet.

The commander of the Mediterranean Fleet, Pierre Martin, designated a squadron for this operation under Commodore Joseph de Richery. The force comprised six ships of the line and three frigates, led by the 80-gun Victoire, and departed Toulon on 14 September 1795. Toulon was under blockade at the time by the Royal Navy Mediterranean Fleet under Admiral William Hotham based at San Fiorenzo on Corsica, although the blockade was only loosely enforced and Hotham was not even aware that Richery had sailed until 22 September.

== Attack on the Levant Convoy ==
Richery sailed westwards through the Mediterranean unopposed, past Gibraltar and out into the Atlantic. On 7 October, while off Cape St Vincent on the coast of Portugal, sails were sighted to the southwest and Richery took his squadron in pursuit. These sails were soon revealed to be the annual British convoy from the Levant, a large collection of merchant vessels from the Eastern Mediterranean sailing for Britain. The convoy was escorted by a small squadron under Commodore Thomas Taylor, who formed line with his three ships of the line to hold the French off and allow the convoy to scatter.

Richery sent his frigates ahead to attack the fleeing merchant ships, while his main squadron bore down on the outnumbered British warships. The rearmost ship of the British line was the 74-gun HMS Censeur, a French-built ship captured by the British off Genoa in March and still in a disabled condition. The ship mounted only jury masts and was armed en flute, carrying insufficient gunpowder to sustain any significant engagement. As the British formed up, the fore topmast on Censeur collapsed, causing the ship to fall behind its companions. Richery focused his attack on the disabled ship as the rest of Taylor's squadron pulled away. After a brief exchange of fire with the stern-chaser guns on HMS Fortitude and HMS Bedford and the frigate HMS Lutine, Taylor pulled out of range and Censeur was abandoned. In a short action the remaining topmasts of the British ship were knocked down and Captain John Gore struck his flag and surrendered. The unprotected merchant ships were rapidly overrun by Richery's warships; thirty were captured and only one escaped.

Richery carried his prizes back towards the Spanish coast, reaching the neutral but friendly naval port of Cádiz. Agreements between France and Spain limited the number of French ships permitted in harbour to three, the remainder anchoring at Rota instead. Shortly after arrival a British squadron sent by Hotham arrived off Cádiz. This force was under the command of Rear-Admiral Robert Mann and comprised six ships of the line and two frigates. Mann then instituted a blockade of Cádiz, cruising off the port in anticipation of Richery's departure. While at anchor in Cádiz, Richery was promoted to counter admiral.

== Raiding Newfoundland ==
At Rota the squadron was more exposed to the weather than they would have been in Cádiz, and on 17 December a storm swept the bay, driving Victoire, Duquesne and Révolution onto the shore. All three were badly damaged and required extensive repairs in Cádiz before the squadron would be ready to sail once more. It was not until August 1796 that Richery next had an opportunity to return to sea, when diplomatic negotiations between the French Republic and the Kingdom of Spain favoured an alliance. Although the terms were not signed until some time later, as good will gesture the Spanish fleet under Admiral Juan de Lángara agreed to accompany Richery out of the harbour with sufficient force to drive off a British attack. Lángara assembled 20 ships of the line and 14 other vessels to join Richery's ten warships, the combined fleet sailing on 4 August. The precaution was unnecessary; Mann had been ordered to return to the Mediterranean Fleet on 29 July by Vice-Admiral Sir John Jervis, although Mann's hasty return later seriously jeopardised the ability of the Mediterranean Fleet to operate efficiently, and Jervis was ultimately forced to abandon the Mediterranean entirely.

Lángara detached an escort fleet under Rear-Admiral José Solano y Bote, which sailed with Richery for 300 nautical miles (560 km) into the Atlantic. Once alone again, the French admiral steered a course northwest, planning to fulfill part of his original mission and attack the fisheries of Maritime Canada. On 28 August Richery's squadron reached the Grand Banks, and shortly afterwards was sighted off St. John's, capital of the Newfoundland Colony. The British forces on station amounted to only a handful of small frigates and the fourth rate flagship HMS Romney under Vice-Admiral Sir James Wallace. Of these ships only one, the 32-gun frigate HMS Venus, was in harbour when the French arrived. Under Williams' orders, Captain Thomas Graves, positioned Venus to block the harbour mouth and landed most of his crew to man the shore batteries and Fort Amherst. Williams augmented the appearance of his garrison by marching his few men around and around Fort Amherst and Signal Hill. Richery approached the harbour on 2 September but then withdrew in the face of this determined opposition.

Instead the French admiral turned towards Bay Bulls, landing forces there to burn fishing boats, fishing stages and seasonal fishing camps on 4 September. This accomplished, he divided his squadron, sending Captain Zacharie Allemand with Duquesne, Censeur and the frigate Friponne to attack Chateau Bay on the coast of Labrador while he took the remainder of the squadron to the islands of Saint-Pierre and Miquelon. Richery's descent on the islands was rapid, his forces landing without opposition and systematically destroying all of the buildings, fishing stages and boats of the communities there. Allemand was delayed by heavy fogs, and did not arrive at Chateau Bay until 22 September. He found that most of the seasonal fishing fleets had already returned to Europe. He demanded the surrender of the remainder, but the British commander had already set the infrastructure on fire at his approach. Satisfied, he departed for France.

In both Britain and France, rumours swirled that Richery had attacked and captured St. John's, devastated the town and captured more than a thousand prisoners. It was not until the arrival of reinforcements from Bermuda under Vice-Admiral George Murray on 27 September that accurate reports reached Europe.

== Return ==
As Richery turned back to France, having captured or destroyed more than a hundred British vessels off the coast of North America, he sent many of his prisoners into Halifax in a cartel, although about 300 were brought back to France as prisoners of war. It was hoped in France that Richery's returning squadron could be used to reinforce the planned Expédition d'Irlande, a large scale French effort to invade Ireland due to sail in the winter of 1796. However Richery was unable to rejoin with Allemand, and the dispersed squadron was vulnerable to the significant British blockade squadrons then operating off the French Biscay coast.

It was intended that Richery would join the squadron at Lorient and sail together to Brest in preparation for the Irish operation, but he was initially driven off by the British presence off the port and had to anchor at Rochefort instead on 4 November. Allemand reached Lorient without further incident on 15 November. Richery was later able to join the Lorient squadron at sea, and together this force attempted to reach Brest but were sighted on approach to the port by a British fleet under Sir John Colpoys and forced to take a long detour. When Richery finally reached Brest on 11 December, just four days before the expedition was due to sail, his ships were all condemned as unfit for further service and docked for lengthy repairs. Richery however was immediately transferred to Pegase and sent out with the fleet. The ensuing expedition was a disaster, with 12 ships lost and thousands of men drowned, although Richery survived to return to Brest on 11 January 1797.

== Order of battle ==
Richery's squadron
Ship	Guns	Commander	Notes
Victoire	80	Captain Lemancq	
Jupiter	74	Counter-admiral Joseph de Richery	
Barra	74	Captain André Maureau	
Berwick	74	Captain Pierre Dumanoir le Pelley	
Révolution	74	Captain Antoine-Jean-Baptiste Faye	
Duquesne	74	Captain Zacharie Allemand	
Censeur	74	Captain Lecourt	Captured at the Battle of the Levant Convoy, 7 October 1795 and added to the squadron.
Embuscade	32		
Félicité	32		
Friponne	32		
