= HMS Audacious (1785) =

74-gun Royal Navy ship of the line

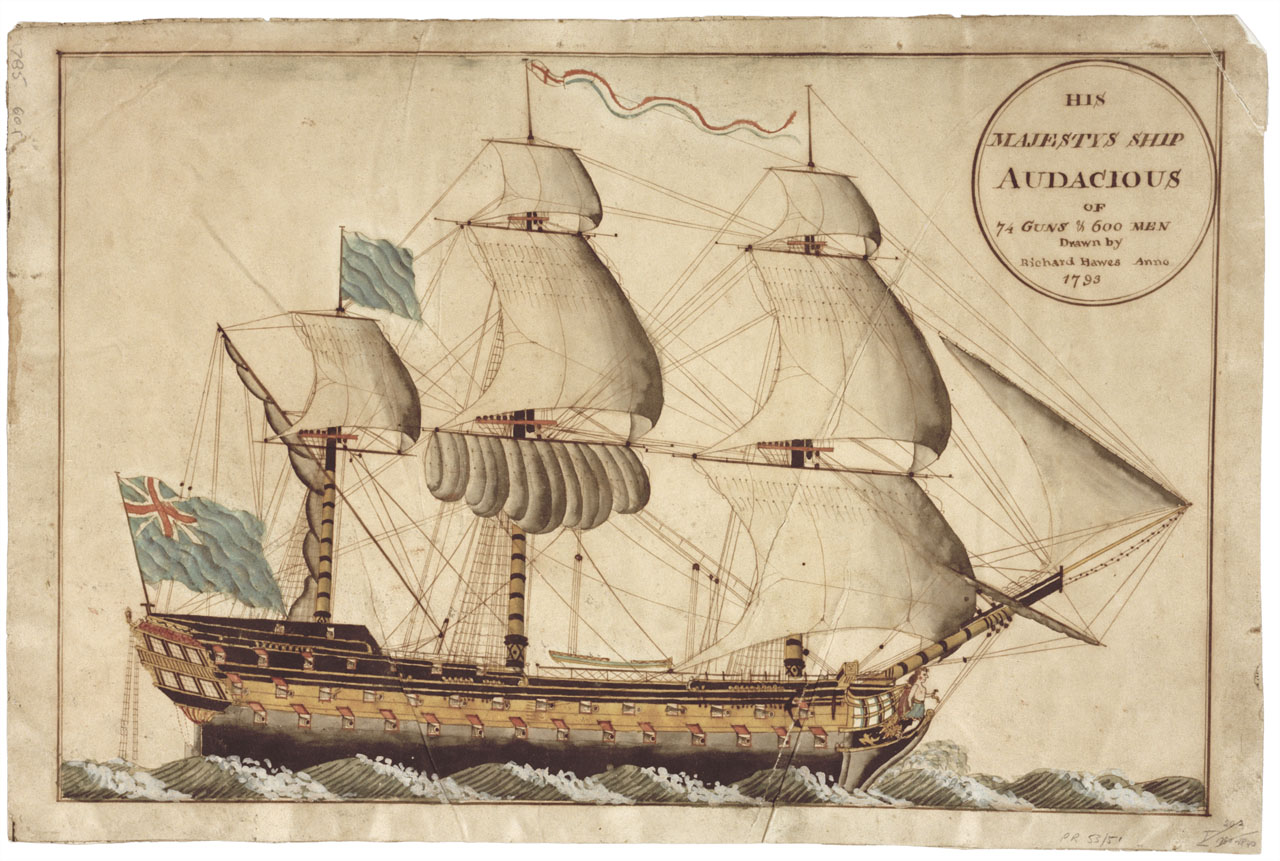
- Audacious

History

Great Britain
- Name: Audacious
- Ordered: 22 October 1782
- Builder: John Randall, Rotherhithe
- Laid down: August 1783
- Launched: 23 July 1785
- Completed: October 1785
- Commissioned: December 1792
- Fate: Broken up, August 1815
- Notes: Participated in: Battle of the Nile

General characteristics
- Class & type: Arrogant-class ship of the line
- Tons burthen: 1,624 27/94 (bm)
- Length: 168 ft 2 in (51.3 m) (gundeck)
- Beam: 47 ft 1 in (14.4 m)
- Draught: 17 ft 9 in (5.4 m) (light)
- Depth of hold: 19 ft 10 in (6.0 m)
- Propulsion: Sails
- Sail plan: Full-rigged ship
- Complement: 600
- Armament: 74 muzzle-loading, smoothbore guns: Lower gundeck: 28 × 32 pdr guns; Upper gundeck: 28 × 18 pdr guns; Forecastle: 4 × 9 pdr guns; Quarter deck: 14 × 9 pdr guns

HMS Audacious was a 74-gun third rate Arrogant-class ship of the line built for the Royal Navy during the 1780s. Completed in 1785, she served during the French Revolutionary Wars and the Napoleonic Wars. She was broken up in August 1815.

== Description ==
The Arrogant-class ship of the line was designed by Sir Thomas Slade, co-Surveyor of the Navy. It was one of the "common" type of 74 with lighter guns than those of the "large" classes. Audacious was one of the slightly modified second batch of Arrogants. She measured 168 feet 2 inches (51.3 m) on the gundeck and 137 feet 9 inches (42.0 m) on the keel. She had a beam of 47 feet 1 inch (14.4 m), a depth of hold of 19 feet 10 inches (6.0 m) and had a tonnage of 1,624 27/94 tons burthen. The ship's draught was 12 feet 6 inches (4 m) forward and 17 feet 9 inches (5.4 m) aft at light load; fully loaded, her draught would be significantly deeper. The ships' crew numbered 600 officers and ratings. They were fitted with three masts and were ship-rigged.

The ships were armed with 74 muzzle-loading, smoothbore guns that consisted of twenty-eight 32-pounder guns on their lower gundeck and twenty-eight 18-pounder guns on their upper deck. Their forecastle mounted four 9-pounder guns. On their quarterdeck they carried fourteen 9-pounder guns.

== Construction and career ==
Audacious was the first ship of her name to serve in the Royal Navy. She was ordered on 22 October 1782 and was laid down by Henry Adams at his shipyard in Rotherhithe in August 1783. The ship was launched on 23 July 1785. Audacious was completed at Deptford and Woolwich Dockyards in October and immediately placed in ordinary. The ship was commissioned by Captain William Parker in December 1792.

She was assigned to Admiral Lord Richard Howe's Channel Fleet and participated in the Atlantic campaign of May 1794. After spotting the main body of the French fleet to windward on the morning of 28 May, Howe ordered his closest division of four ships of the line, commanded by Rear-Admiral Thomas Pasley, to reconnoitre the French. After the French turned away that afternoon Howe ordered a general chase and to engage the enemy when in range. Pasley's ships fought the 110-gun first-rate Révolutionnaire until Howe ordered them to disengage that evening after Pasley's flagship Bellerophon's rigging had been badly damaged. The ships had knocked the French ship's mizzenmast down and otherwise damaged her withdrawing before. Audacious had joined the battle a half-hour before Howe ordered the disengagement and continued to exchange broadsides with Révolutionnaire for several more hours. The French ship was able to disengage despite the heavy damage to her masts and rigging. She had suffered nearly 400 casualties in the battle while Audacious had only lost 3 men killed and 19 wounded, 3 mortally, the French gunners having wrecked her masts, yards and rigging.

The following day she was spotted by the French 36-gun frigate Bellone in company with two corvettes. The frigate harassed Audacious for a time while the corvettes stood off before they all turned away. The third rate had limited manoeuverability due to her jury-rigged masts and sails, but was able to arrive in Plymouth Sound on 3 June. Captain Alexander Hood assumed command in July. The ship was assigned to the Mediterranean Fleet in mid-1795 and departed on 23 May, arriving on 14 June. Hood was relieved by Captain William Shield sometime in June. Audacious was present during the Battle of the Hyères Islands on 13 July, but did not engage any French ships.

Commodore Joseph de Richery's squadron sortied from Toulon on 14 September on a mission to attack shipping near Newfoundland. Admiral William Hotham, commander of the Mediterranean Fleet, learned of the French sortie on 22 September, but he did not dispatch Rear-Admiral Robert Mann in pursuit with six ships of the line, including Audacious, until 5 October.

The ship was refitted between January and March 1797 at HM Dockyard, Devonport. Captain Davidge Gould assumed command of the ship the following year.

She also took part in the Battle of the Nile, under, where she engaged the French ship Conquérant and helped to force her surrender.
