= Naval campaigns, operations and battles of the French Revolutionary Wars =

Naval campaigns, operations and battles of the French Revolutionary Wars lists all major naval battles from the French Revolutionary Wars.

== List of naval battles of the French Revolutionary Wars ==
Today's location of the battle, its name and date	French leader	Coalition leader
Italy: French expedition to Sardinia; 1792-12-21; 1793-05-25	Defeat: French Republic: Truguet	Victory: KD Sardinia: Domenico Millelire KD Spain: Lángara
France: Siege of Toulon; 1793-08-29; 1793-12-19	Victory: French Republic: Carteaux; Dugommier; Napoleon; Poype; Charlot	Defeat: French Royalists: d'Imbert French Federalists KD Great Britain: Hood; O'Hara; Smith; Mulgrave KD Spain: Lángara; Gravina KD Naples KD Sicily KD Sardinia
Guernsey: Action of 23 April 1794; 1794-04-23	Defeat: French Republic: Desgareaux	Victory: KD Great Britain: Warren; Strachan
France: Atlantic campaign of May 1794; 1794-05-02; 1794-06-01	Inconclusive: French Republic: Joyeuse; Nielly	Inconclusive: KD Great Britain: Howe; Montagu
France: Glorious First of June; 1794-06-01	Inconclusive: French Republic: Joyeuse	Inconclusive: KD Great Britain: Howe
France: Croisière du Grand Hiver; 1794-12-24; 1795-02-03	Defeat: French Republic: Joyeuse; Bouvet	Victory: KD Great Britain: Smith
Spain: Battle of the Gulf of Roses; 1795-02-14	Defeat: French Republic: Guet	Victory: KD Spain: Lángara
Italy: Battle of Genoa (1795); 1795-03-13; 1795-03-14	Defeat: French Republic: Martin	Victory: KD Great Britain: Hotham KD Naples
France: Cornwallis's Retreat; 1795-06-16; 1795-06-17	Defeat: French Republic: Joyeuse	Victory: KD Great Britain: William Cornwallis
France: Battle of Groix; 1795-06-23	Defeat: French Republic: Joyeuse	Victory: KD Great Britain: Hood
France: Battle of the Hyères Islands; 1795-07-13	Defeat: French Republic: Martin	Victory: KD Great Britain: William Hotham; Horatio Nelson KD Naples
Portugal: Battle of the Levant Convoy; 1795-10-07	Victory: French Republic: Richery	Defeat: KD Great Britain: Taylor
South Africa: Capitulation of Saldanha Bay; 1796-08-17	Defeat: Batavian Republic: Lucas	Victory: KD Great Britain: Elphinstone
Canada: Newfoundland expedition 1796-08-28; 1796-09-05	Victory: French Republic: Richery Spain: Solano	Defeat: KD Great Britain: Newfoundland: Wallace
Bantry Bay: French expedition to Ireland (1796); December 1796	Defeat: French Republic: Hoche; Galles	Victory: KD Great Britain: Kingsmill; Pellew
Portugal: Battle of Cape St. Vincent (1797); 1797-02-14	Defeat: Spain: Ramos; Morales; Winthuysen; Moreno; Amblimont	Victory: KD Great Britain: Jervis; Waldegrave; Thompson; Parker; Nelson
Netherlands: Battle of Camperdown; 1797-10-11	Defeat: Batavian Republic: Winter	Victory: KD Great Britain: Duncan
France: Battle of the Îles Saint-Marcouf; 1798-05-07	Defeat: French Republic: Muskein	Victory: KD Great Britain: Price
Egypt: Battle of the Nile; 1798-08-01; 1798-08-03	Defeat: French Republic: Aigalliers	Victory: KD Great Britain: Nelson
Malta: Siege of Malta (1798–1800); 1798-09-02; 1800-09-04	Defeat: French Republic: Vaubois; Perrée; Villeneuve	Victory: Maltese irregulars: Vitale; Caruana; Borg KD Great Britain: Nelson; Ball
Ireland: Battle of Tory Island; 1798-10-12	Defeat: French Republic: Bompart	Victory: KD Great Britain: Warren
France: Raid on Dunkirk (1800); 1800-07-07	Defeat: French Republic: Castagnier	Victory: KD Great Britain: Inman
Denmark: Battle of Copenhagen (1801); 1801-04-02	Defeat: : Fischer; Bille	Victory: United Kingdom: Parker; Nelson
Spain: Algeciras campaign 1801-06-13; 1801-07-14	Inconclusive: French Republic: Linois Spain: Mondragón	Inconclusive: United Kingdom: James Saumarez
France: Raids on Boulogne; 1801-08-04; 1801-08-16	Victory: French Republic: Tréville	Defeat: United Kingdom: Nelson
