= Battle of the Levant Convoy =

1795 battle of the War of the First Coalition

- Part of the War of the First Coalition
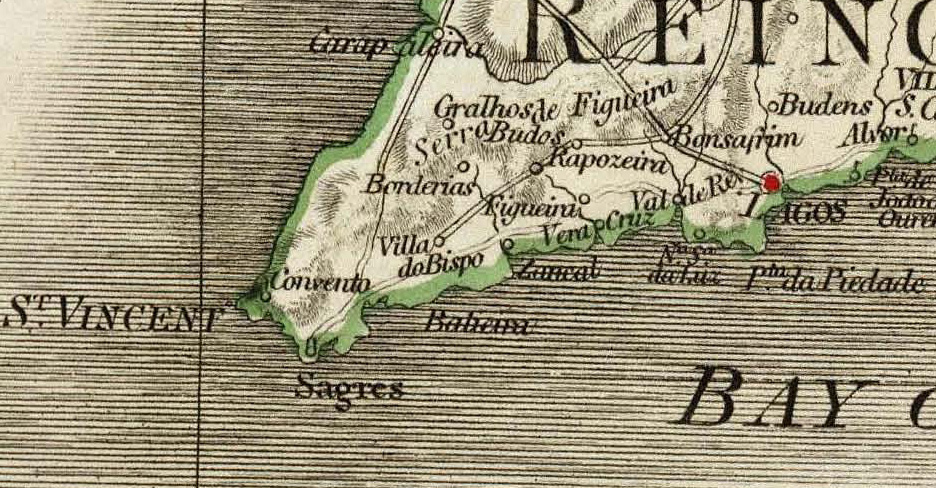
- 1797 map of Cape St. Vincent
Date	7 October 1795
Location	Off Cape St. Vincent, Atlantic Ocean
Result	French victory

Belligerents
France	Great Britain

Commanders and leaders
Joseph de Richery	Thomas Taylor

Strength
6 ships of the line 3 frigates	3 ships of the line 1 frigate 31 merchantmen

Casualties and losses
Unknown	1 ship of the line captured 30 merchantmen captured

The Battle of the Levant Convoy was a naval engagement of the War of the First Coalition fought on 7 October 1795. During the battle, a powerful French squadron surprised a valuable British convoy from the Levant off Cape St. Vincent on the coast of Portugal. The convoy was weakly defended, and although the small escort squadron tried to drive the French back, they were outmatched. In the ensuing action one of the British ships of the line and almost the entire convoy was overrun and captured. The French commander, Commodore Joseph de Richery, then retired to the neutral Spanish port of Cádiz, where he came under blockade.

The annual British Levant convoy was a mercantile operation in which valuable merchant shipping from ports across the Eastern Mediterranean gathered together for security under escort to Britain by Royal Navy warships. In 1795, this escort comprised three ships of the line, one in a poor state of repair, and several frigates under the command of Commodore Thomas Taylor. Taylor split the convoy, sailing in two separate divisions. On 7 October a French squadron under Richery, sent from Toulon to attack the Newfoundland fisheries, encountered Taylor's division of the convoy.

Taylor attempted to hold off Richery for long enough for the merchant ships to scatter and escape, but one of his ships, HMS Censeur, lost a top-mast as he formed a line of battle and was rapidly overwhelmed by the French. With his line broken and frigates seizing the merchant ships unopposed, Taylor turned away from the battle and withdrew, leaving the convoy to its fate. Only one ship survived. Richery took his prizes to Cádiz in Southern Spain, where he was subject to a blockade by a British squadron under Rear-Admiral Robert Mann. Nearly a year later he escaped with the help of the Spanish to inflict severe damage on the fishing fleets off Maritime Canada.

== Background ==
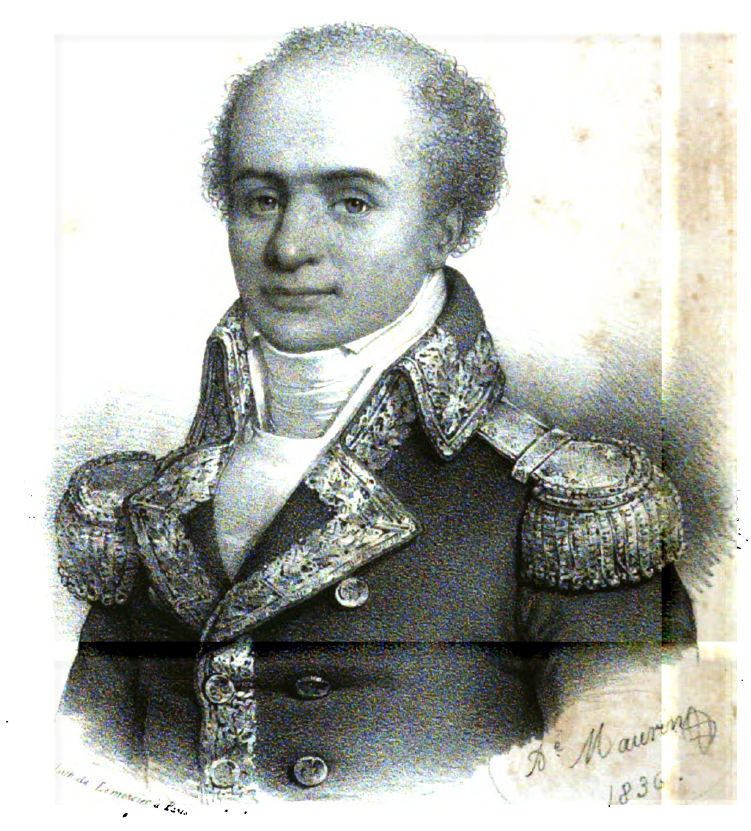
1835 portrait of Richery

The French Navy in the Atlantic had suffered severe losses in a series of defeats during the early years of the French Revolutionary Wars, particularly at the Glorious First of June in 1794 and during the Croisière du Grand Hiver the following winter. In June 1795 three more ships were lost in the defeat at the Battle of Groix. Requests for reinforcements were sent to the Mediterranean Fleet, which had suffered its own severe losses at the Siege of Toulon in 1793, and later at the Battle of Genoa and the Battle of the Hyères Islands in the spring and summer of 1795. The commander of the Mediterranean Fleet, Vice-amiral Pierre Martin acceded to the request, preparing a squadron of six ships of the line and three frigates under Contre-amiral Joseph de Richery to reinforce the Brest fleet.

This force was under orders to sail across the Atlantic, unite with French naval units in the Caribbean to land an army in Saint-Domingue and attack shipping at Jamaica. It was then to sail north to attack the important cod fisheries off Newfoundland and Maritime Canada, before returning to France via the Azores to unite with the fleet at Brest. Martin was wary of the British Mediterranean Fleet, which had so recently inflicted defeats on his own force, but Vice-Admiral of the Red William Hotham, then serving as Commander-in-Chief, Mediterranean Fleet and based at his anchorage at San Fiorenzo, had kept the blockade of Toulon loose. As a result, Richery was able to escape into the Ligurian Sea without being detected on 14 September. Martin also knew that the annual British merchant convoy from the Levant was due to pass westwards on its way to the Straits of Gibraltar, and several weeks later sent out a second squadron, under Commodore Honoré Ganteaume, in search of it.

Martin was unaware that the convoy had sailed earlier than anticipated, reaching Gibraltar ahead of Richery and long before Ganteaume even sailed. At Gibraltar the 63-ship convoy met with its escort provided from Hotham's fleet. This force was led by Commodore Thomas Taylor in 74-gun HMS Fortitude, accompanied by HMS Bedford and HMS Censeur as well as the frigates HMS Argo, HMS Juno, HMS Lutine and the fireship HMS Tisiphone. Censeur, under the command of Captain John Gore, was not fit for service; the ship had been a French warship captured off Genoa in March and was still in a poor state of repair, armed en flute and carrying only jury masts.

== Richery's encounter ==
Taylor's convoy sailed from Gibraltar on 25 September, progressing slowly westwards into the Atlantic. The following day Taylor split his force, sending 32 merchant ships with Argo and Juno, while he took 31 merchant ships along the Spanish and Portuguese coasts with his main force. By the morning of 7 October the convoy was passing slowly around Cape St. Vincent, 144 nautical miles (267 km) offshore with land to the southeast. At 09:30 sails were sighted to the northeast and Thomas rapidly realised that they were an enemy force. Issuing hasty orders to his squadron to establish a short line of battle, he formed up with Fortitude in the lead, followed by Bedford and Censeur, supported by Lutine and Tisiphone. The convoy was ordered to scatter.

Richery bore down on Taylor's small squadron, sending his frigates Embuscade, Félicité and Friponne to attack the fleeing merchant ships. Taylor hoped to hold the French off for long enough to allow the convoy to escape, but the frigates simply evaded the line. In addition, the damaged Censeur was unable to hold station and at 13:00 the jury top-foremast collapsed over the side forcing Gore to fall back, away from Taylor's other ships. Taylor discussed the situation with his officers and Captain Augustus Montgomery on Bedford, reaching agreement to withdraw. Fortitude and Bedford then pulled away from the French in formation, leaving Censeur behind.

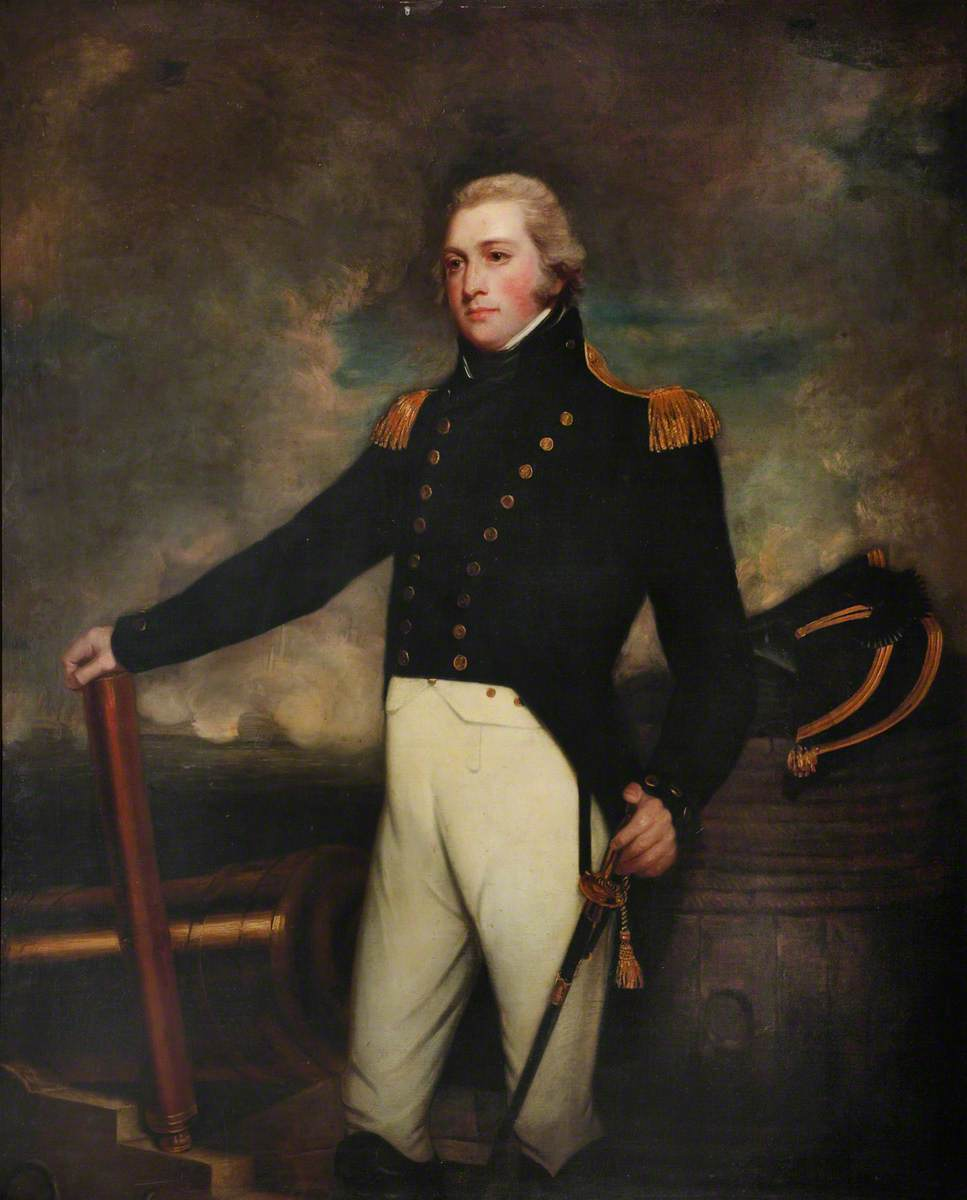
1796 portrait of Gore

At 13:50 the leading French ships opened fire on Censeur, Gore returning fire, distantly assisted by the stern-chaser guns on Fortitude and Bedford, Taylor and Montgomery having their gunners smash holes in their ships' sterns to fit the cannon. Richery's squadron bore down on the retreating British line, firing at the masts on Censeur and bringing down both remaining topmasts in quick succession. Gore had not been expected to engage in action in his damaged ship and so there was little gunpowder on board. By 14:30 it had all been consumed and, abandoned by Taylor, Gore struck his colours and surrendered to three of the French ships. Richery's leading ships now engaged Lutine, Captain William Haggitt briefly returning fire as he pulled away. With Censeur secured and his frigates amid the merchant ships, Richery called off pursuit and allowed Taylor to retreat.

== Aftermath ==
Unprotected, the Levant convoy was destroyed. Richery's frigates captured all but one of the British merchant vessels, 30 ships. Gathering his prizes, the French admiral turned back towards the Spanish coast, eventually anchoring in the neutral but friendly Spanish fleet base of Cádiz. Due to treaties in place at the time, only three of Richery's ships could dock at Cádiz itself, the rest anchoring in the less sheltered port of Rota. There he was trapped; Hotham had learned on 22 September that Richery was at sea, and on 5 October had dispatched a squadron of six ships of the line and two frigates in pursuit under Rear-Admiral Robert Mann. As Richery had a three-week start, Mann arrived off Cádiz far too late to intercede in the action, but did find Richery only recently anchored in the harbour. Following his orders to pursue the French, Mann established a blockade of Cádiz awaiting Richery's return to sea. The Argo convoy, under Captain Richard Burgess proceeded unchallenged and reached Britain intact. Historian William Laird Clowes laid blame for the destruction of the convoy on Hotham, stating that his behaviour "offers additional proof of that officer's unfitness for the very important command with which he had been entrusted." This was not the first time the Levant convoy had been targeted by the French Navy; 102 years earlier during the Nine Years' War a much larger Levant convoy had been overrun and destroyed by the French in the same waters, at the Battle of Lagos.

The blockade was to last ten months, during which Richery was unable to find an opportunity to escape Mann's watch on the approaches to the Spanish port. His ships were battered by winter storms, and on 17 December Victoire, Duquesne and Révolution were all blown on shore and badly damaged. They required extensive repairs in the Cádiz dockyards before they were ready for sea once more. The French were eventually released by diplomatic means; in the spring of 1796 the French Republic and the Kingdom of Spain had begun negotiations on an alliance against Britain, which was eventually signed at the Treaty of San Ildefonso on 19 August. As a gesture of good will, the Spanish fleet at Cádiz under Admiral Juan de Lángara agreed to escort Richery out of the harbour with sufficient force to dissuade an attack by Mann. Lángara took 20 ships of the line and 14 other vessels to sea on 4 August, accompanied by Richery's ten warships. They found the approaches to Cádiz empty; Mann had retired from the blockade on 29 July under orders from Vice-Admiral Sir John Jervis.

Lángara sent Richery 300 nautical miles (560 km) westwards with a large escort under Rear-Admiral José Solano y Bote, the French admiral then separating and fulfilling his original mission to attack British fisheries in Maritime Canada. During September he burned fishing fleets and coastal communities across Newfoundland and Labrador before returning to France unimpeded, having captured or destroyed more than a hundred British merchant ships during his operation.

== Order of battle ==
Richery's squadron
Ship	Guns	Commander	Notes
Victoire	80	Captain Lemancq	
Jupiter	74	Captain Joseph de Richery	
Barra	74	Captain André Maureau	
Berwick	74	Captain Pierre Dumanoir le Pelley	
Révolution	74	Captain Antoine-Jean-Baptiste Faye	
Duquesne	74	Captain Zacharie Allemand	
Embuscade	32		
Félicité	32	Captain Lecourt	
Friponne	32		

Taylor's squadron
Ship	Guns	Commander	Notes
HMS Fortitude	74	Commodore Thomas Taylor	
HMS Bedford	74	Captain Augustus Montgomery	
HMS Censeur	74	Captain John Gore	Armed en flute. Cut off and captured. Returned to French Navy under the same name.
HMS Lutine	32	Commander William Haggitt	
HMS Tisiphone	14	Commander Joseph Turner	
