= Bay Bulls =

Bay Bulls may refer to:

- Bay Bulls, Newfoundland and Labrador, the town in Canada
- Bay Bulls (Newfoundland and Labrador), the body of water in Canada
