= Allons, Alpes-de-Haute-Provence =

Allons Alonh
- Commune
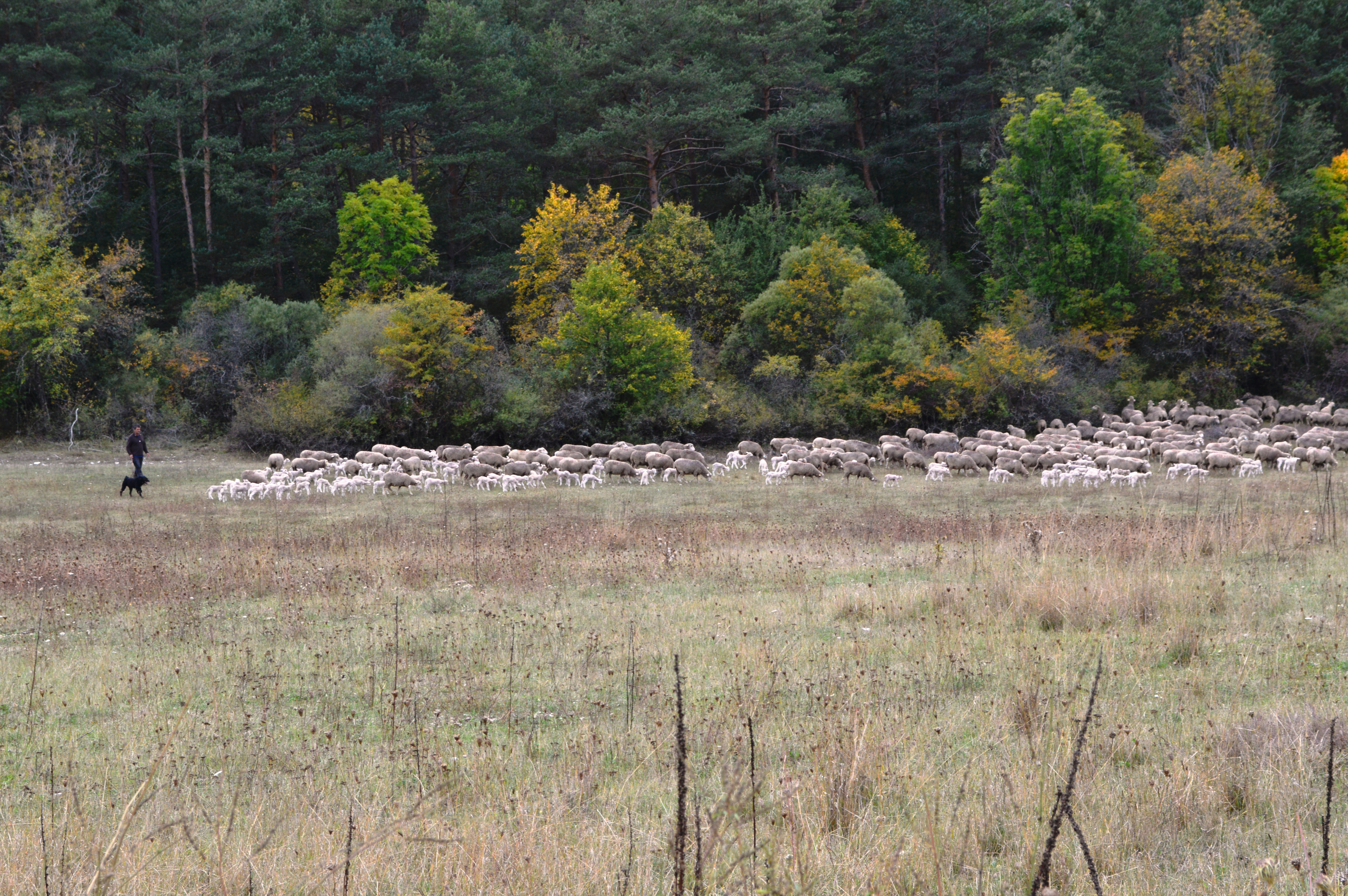
- Herding sheep in Allons

- Coat of arms
- Location of Allons
- Location within France Location within Provence-Alpes-Côte d'Azur
- Coordinates: 43°58′42″N 6°35′45″E
- Country: France
- Region: Provence-Alpes-Côte d'Azur
- Department: Alpes-de-Haute-Provence
- Arrondissement: Castellane
- Canton: Castellane
- Intercommunality: Alpes Provence Verdon - Sources de Lumière

Government
  - Mayor (2026–32): Christophe Iacobbi
- Area^{1}: 41.71 km^{2} (16.10 sq mi)
- Elevation: 1,073 m (3,520 ft)
- Highest elevation: 1,992 m (6,535 ft)
- Lowest elevation: 951 m (3,120 ft)
- Population (2023): 126
  - Density: 3.02/km^{2} (7.82/sq mi)
- Time zone: UTC+01:00 (CET)
  - Summer (DST): UTC+02:00 (CEST)
- INSEE/Postal code: 04005 /04170
- ^{1} French Land Register data, which excludes lakes, ponds, glaciers > 1 km^{2} (0.386 sq mi or 247 acres) and river estuaries.

Allons is a commune in the Alpes-de-Haute-Provence department in the Provence-Alpes-Côte d'Azur region of southeastern France.

== Geography ==
Allons occupies an area mainly located in the small valley of the Ivoire, a tributary of the Verdon, away from the main road of the valley of the Verdon some 60 km north-west of Nice and 40 km south-east of Digne. There are two natural closures of the site, one at Vauclause which corresponds to the edge of the commune at the valley of the Verdon, the other immediately at the exit of the village where the remains of a fortification can be seen.

The village is situated at 1,073 m altitude.

The only access to the commune is via road D52 which runs south-east to the village from Road D955 some 6 km north-east of Saint-Andre-les-Alpes.

=== Relief ===
The commune is mountainous with high points including:

- Puy de Rent (1,996 m)
- Le Puy (1,820 m)
- Basse d'Allons (1,493 m)
- Le Roncheret (1,617 m)
- Le Puel (1,532 m)
- Col de l'Iscle (1,394 m)
- Montagnone (1,775 m)
- Chamatte
- Basse d'Angles
- Serres (1,778 m at Serre Gros)

=== Hydrography ===
The commune is traversed by the Ivoire stream into which many streams flow from the mountains. The Ivoire flows into the Verdon (a tributary of the Durance), which forms the north-western border of the commune.

=== Flora ===
The commune is a Drainage basin oriented east-west resulting in a large shady side and a large south-facing slope. On the shady side, there are Pine forests. There is a forest of beech trees growing near the village. A Riparian forest with abundant willow trees grows along the Ivoire stream.

=== Transport ===
There is a railway station at the intersection of the roads called Allons-Argens Halt which is an optional stop on the metre-gauge Nice to Digne line of the Chemins de Fer de Provence.

=== Hamlets ===
- La Moutiere
- La Forêt

=== Natural and technological hazards ===
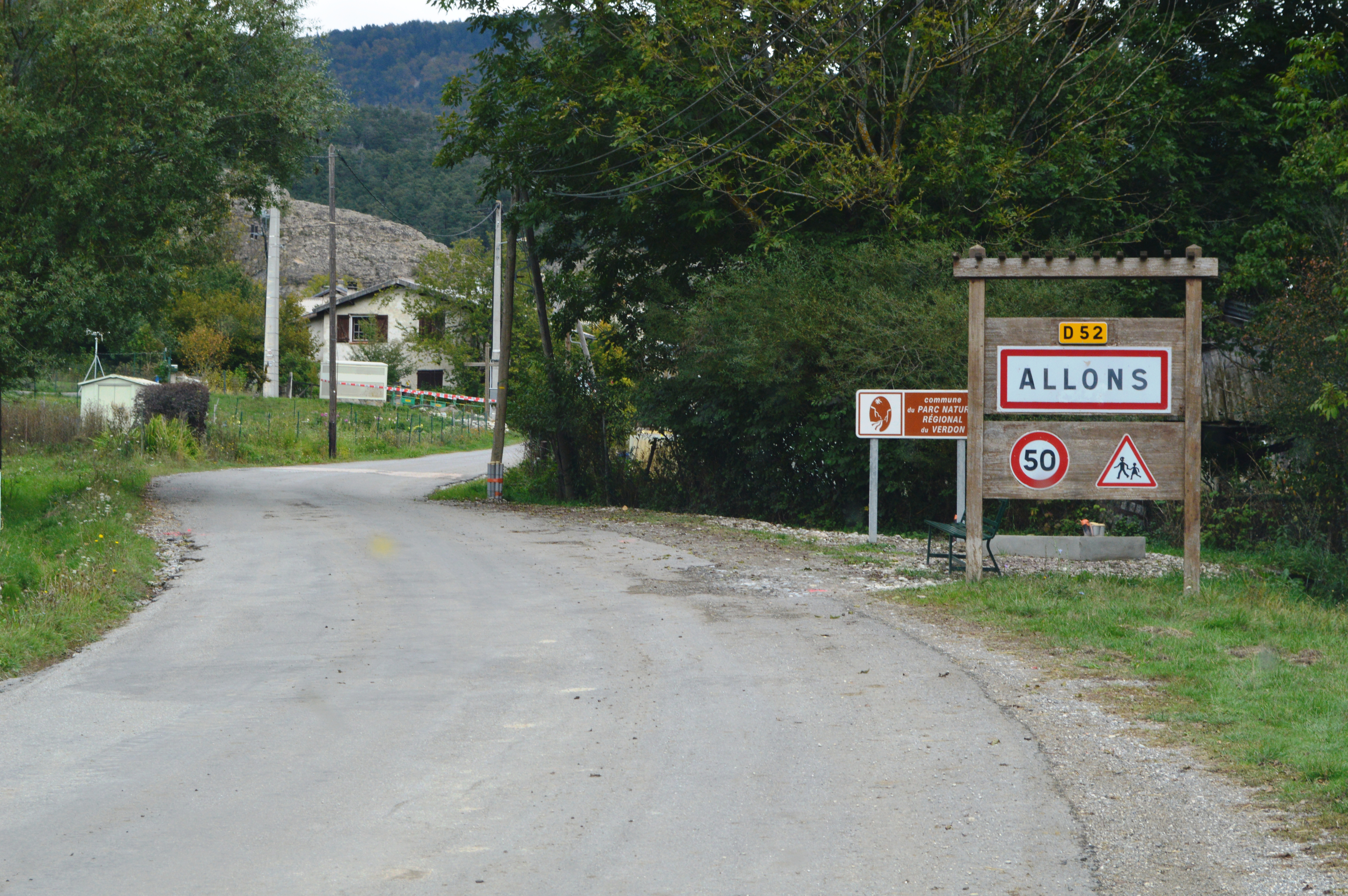
The entry to Allons

The area to which Allons belongs is in zone 1b (low risk) according to the deterministic classification of 1991, based on historical earthquakes (medium risk), and in zone 4 according to the classification probability EC8 of 2011. The common Will also faces three other natural hazards:

- forest fire,
- flood, marginally in the valley of the Verdon)
- landslide: the community is affected by a medium hazard high on the slope located above Vauclause in the valley of the Verdon
- avalanche

The commune is not exposed to any risk of technological origin identified by the prefecture and no prevention plan for foreseeable natural risks (PPR) exists for the commune, the DICRIM has existed since 2011.

The commune was the subject of one natural disaster in 1994 for flooding and mudslides.

=== Toponymy ===
The village is mentioned for the first time in the charters of 1113 (in the form Alonz). This place name is formed from the Germanic proper name Alonius according to Ernest Nègre. Charles Rostaing and Fénié argue that the name was formed from the orographic root (in relation to the mountains) Al- (as in the word alpe). This root is probably older than the Gallic.

== History ==
An oppidum occupied the site of Castellas in the Iron Age. Augustus conquered the valley of the Verdon at the same time as the Alps, which he completed in 14 BC. It is difficult to know the name of the Gallic tribe that inhabited the valley nor the name of the civitas on which Allons depended in the High Empire: Eturamina (Thorame), Civitas Saliniensum (Castellane), or Sanitensium (Senez). At the end of the Roman Empire, the connection to Sanitensium and its diocese seem to be proven.

A bronze statue from Antiquity was once found in the commune (now lost).

=== Middle Ages ===
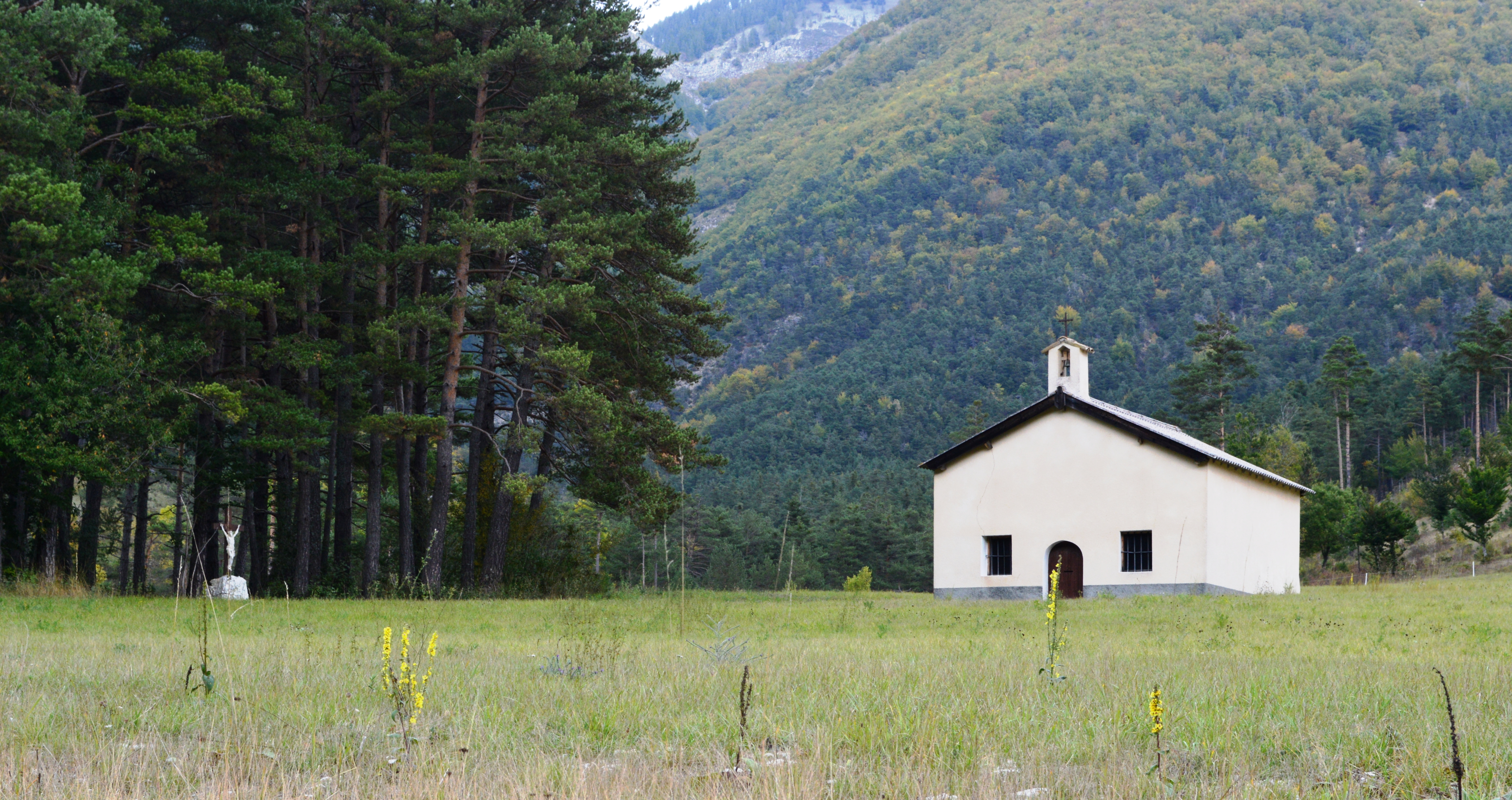
The Chapel of Saint Domnin

It is possible that the Chapel Saint-Domnin at La Moutiere was built on the site occupied by the Allons community in the High Middle Ages in connection with a first monastery. On the opposite side of the valley there are several names of Villas that reinforce this hypothesis. The site of the upper Town, in the valley is possibly contemporary.

In 1072, Pons Sylvain (Pontius Silvanus) owned an important part of the area, if not the entire valley. He donated land to the abbey of Saint-Victor de Marseille which established the priory of Saint Martin there at the end of the 11th to the beginning of the 12th centuries. The village of Allons was created shortly after around a new church which was also called Saint Martin and the priory was abandoned in the 13th century.

The fief belonged to the bishops of Senez and then to the Abbey of St. Victor, Marseille.

The Allons community was under the viguerie of Castellane. Three recognisable structures were found in the village that housed various noble families, among which were that of Requiston and Richery (joint lords), Villeneuve, and Autane - the last two being lords of the fief from 1757 to the French Revolution. These buildings are similar to castles, the largest of them is that of Autane located on the square of the same name, it surprises by its large size and the 17th century style unusual in the region. Since the Revolution the castle has been divided between several owners, and several changes have been made - especially on the roof. The most important lords were the Requiston family.

In 1390, Raymond de Turenne laid siege to the Vauclause castle.

The story of Allons is also linked to that of Vauclause - a rocky outcrop overlooking the entrance to the valley of the Ivoire. In the Middle Ages a community was located there near a castle of which only a few walls remain. This community had twelve fires in 1315 and had no church. It was drastically depopulated by the crises of the 14th century (the Black Death and the Hundred Years War) and was annexed by Allons. The fief of Vauclause was distinct from that of Allons, and remained until the Revolution. Today there is a large farm that is the subject of restoration.

=== From the late Middle Ages to the French Revolution ===
In 1745 the people rebelled against a demand by the Bishop of Senez who removed the bust of Saint Domnin, patron of the parish church but the worship of whom was considered outdated or too close to pagan rituals. The resistance of the villagers caused a transfer of the bishop, Monseigneur Vocance, who was jostled and his clothes torn. Faced with the threat of military intervention the people were minded to concede but in fact hid the bust and continued their devotions.

=== Since the French Revolution ===
There used to be two mills in the commune, on the Verdon and on the Ivoire outside the village.

The tunnel under the pass was completed in 1903, and the entire railway line between Saint Andrew and Nice was inaugurated from 5 to 7 August 1911 in the presence of Victor Augagneur, Minister of Public Works.

In the 20th century the mixed agricultural economy moved towards specialization in lavender, which was processed locally in three distilleries. The mill of Verdon was converted into a Sawmill. These activities have now been abandoned.

=== Heraldry ===
Arms of Allons	Blazon: Gules, a castle of Or turreted with 3 towers the same masoned sable windows and doors the same.

== Administration ==
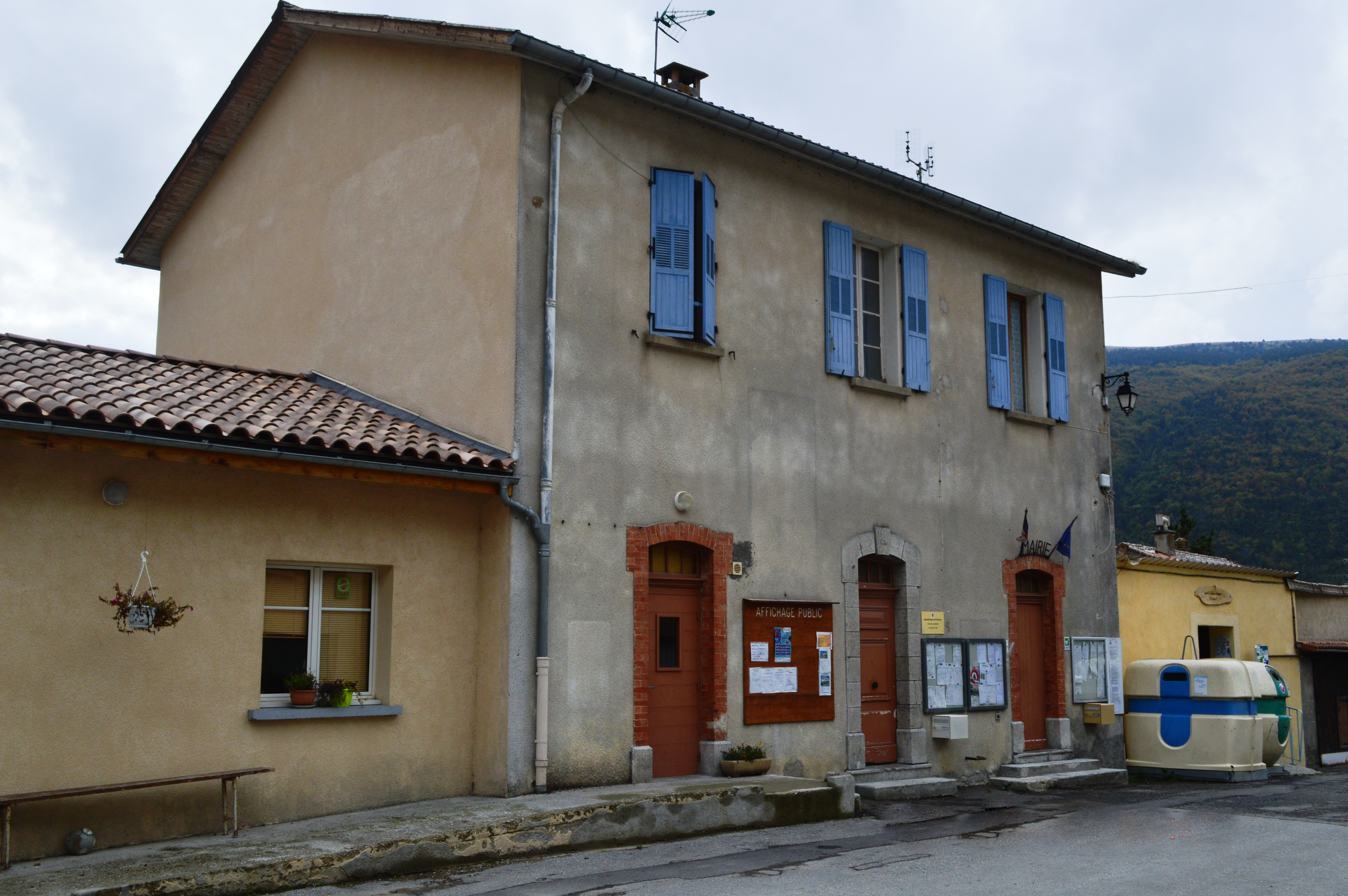
The Town Hall

List of Successive Mayors of Allons

From	To	Name	Party
1983	2014	Élie Galfard	PS
2014	Current	Christophe Iacobbi	DVG

=== Intercommunality ===
Allons is a member of the Community of Alpes Provence Verdon - Sources de Lumière.

=== Budget and Taxation ===
Taxation of Households and Businesses in Allons in 2009
Tax	Communal part	Intercommunal part	Departmental part	Regional part
Housing Tax (TH)	10.00%	0.88%	5.53%	0.00%
Buildings Tax (TFPB)	15.50%	2.53%	14.49%	2.36%
Land Tax (TFPNB)	40.05%	3.33%	47.16%	8.85%
Business Tax (TP)	16.47%*	2.11%	10.80%	3.84%

The regional share of the property tax is not applicable. The business tax was replaced in 2010 by the enterprise land premium (CFE) on the rental value of properties and the contribution of the added value of enterprises (CAVE) (both forming the territorial economic contribution).

== Population ==
The inhabitants of the commune are known as Allonsais or Allonsaises in French.

Historical population
Year	Pop.	±% p.a.
1968	64	—
1975	65	+0.22%
1982	62	−0.67%
1990	73	+2.06%
1999	81	+1.16%
2007	126	+5.68%
2012	142	+2.42%
2017	143	+0.14%
2023	126	−2.09%
Source: INSEE

Prior to 1793 the following censuses had been taken:

- 1315: 89 fires
- 1471: 19 fires
- 1765: 359 people

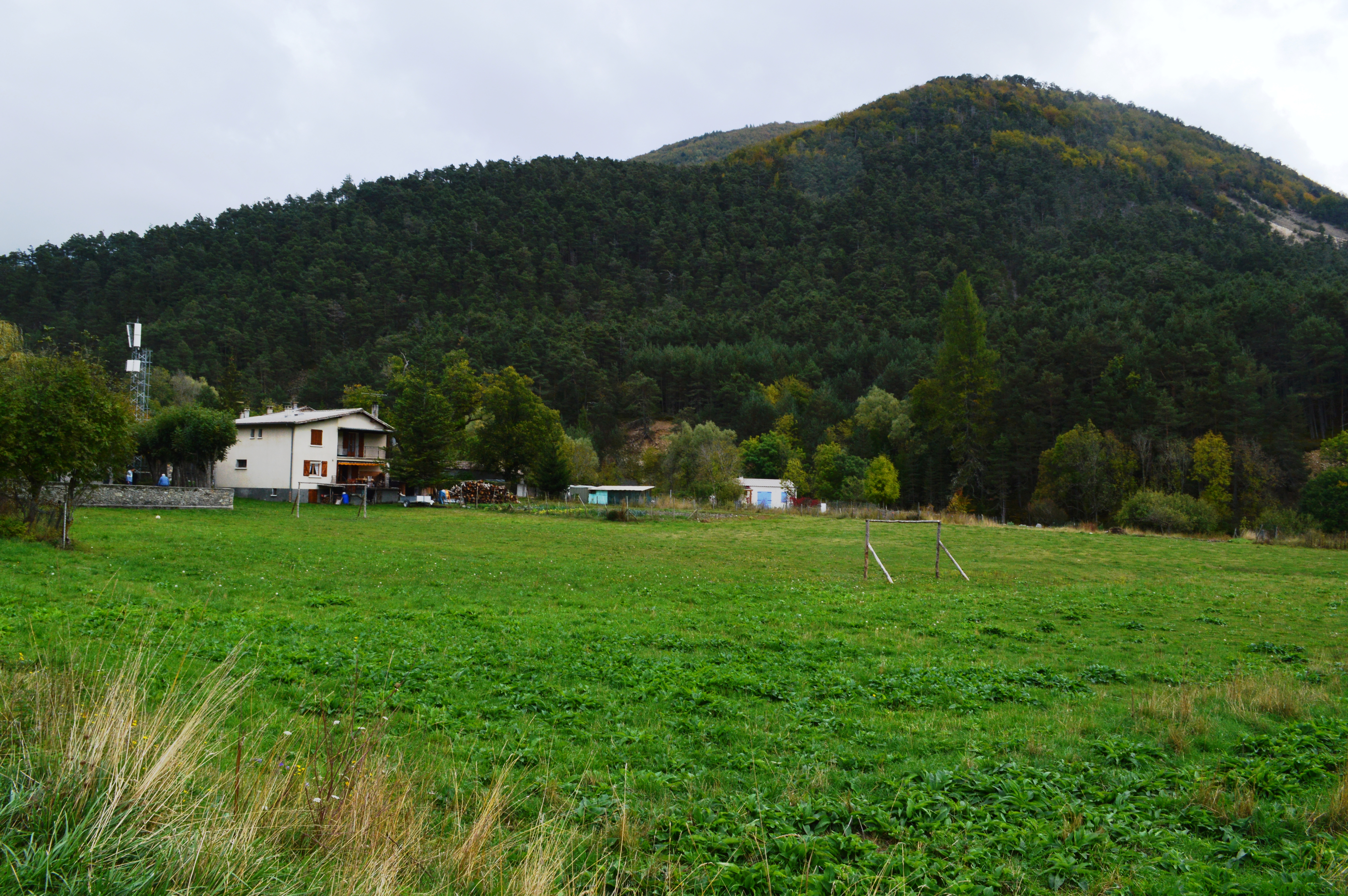
Allons Landscape

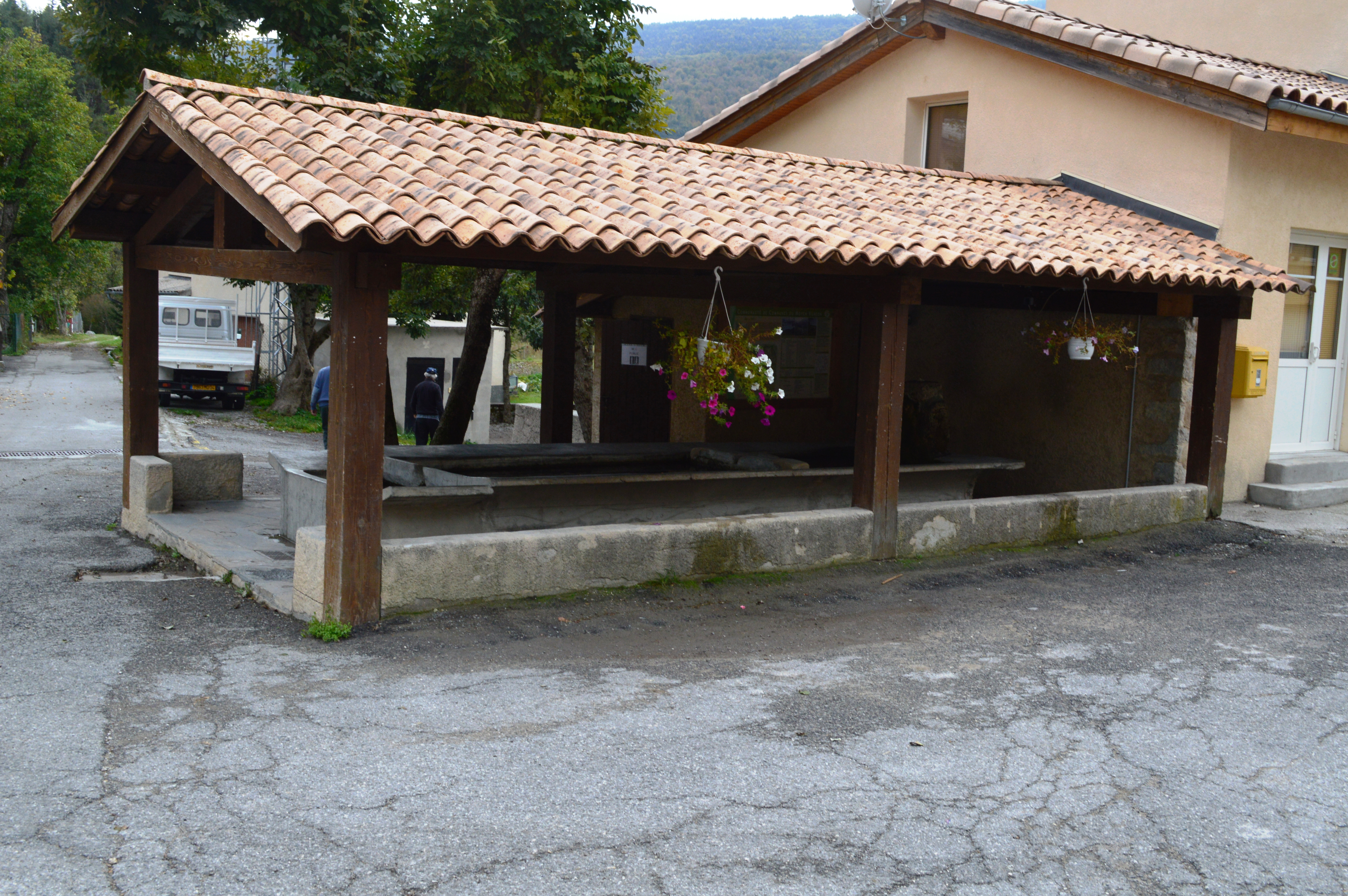
Allons Lavoir (Public Laundry)

== Economy ==
The only jobs in the commune are at three farms and two masonry companies plus a campsite near the Verdon and a bar open during the summer. Much of the population works in Saint-André-les-Alpes.

The Mérimée database says that in 2006 there was only one farm: a sheep farm with a golf course, hay meadows, and cereal crops. Lavender is grown on some plots.

== Culture and heritage ==
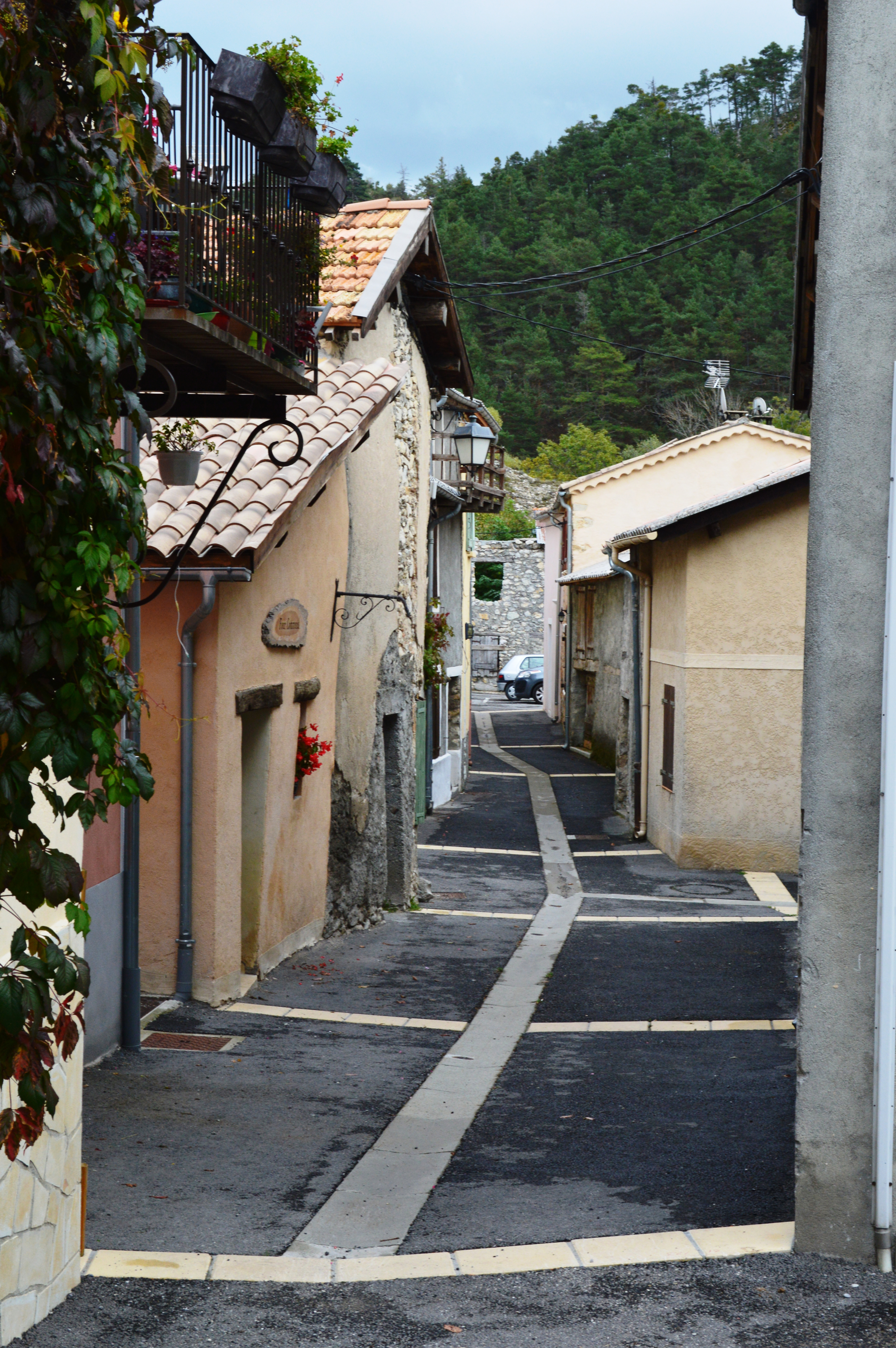
A street in Allons

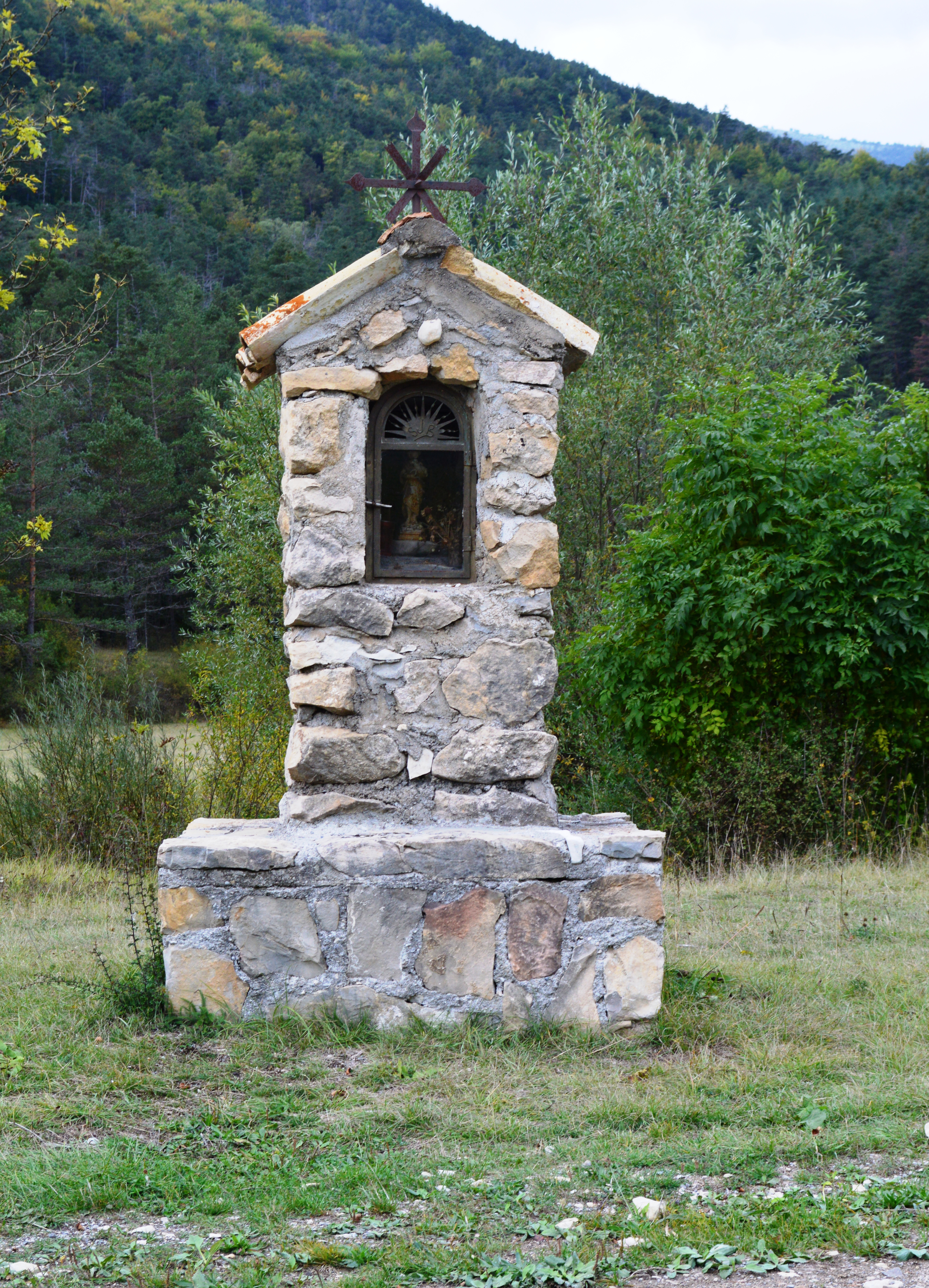
An Oratory in Allons

=== Civil heritage ===
The commune has a very large number of buildings and structures that are registered as historical monuments.

At Vauclause, the remains of the castle are called the Saracen Tower.

There are several lordly manor houses, sometimes called castles:

- three in the village
- one at Vauclause in ruins
- one at La Moutière.

The old communal Oven was inaugurated in 2009 after having restoration done inside

=== Religious heritage ===
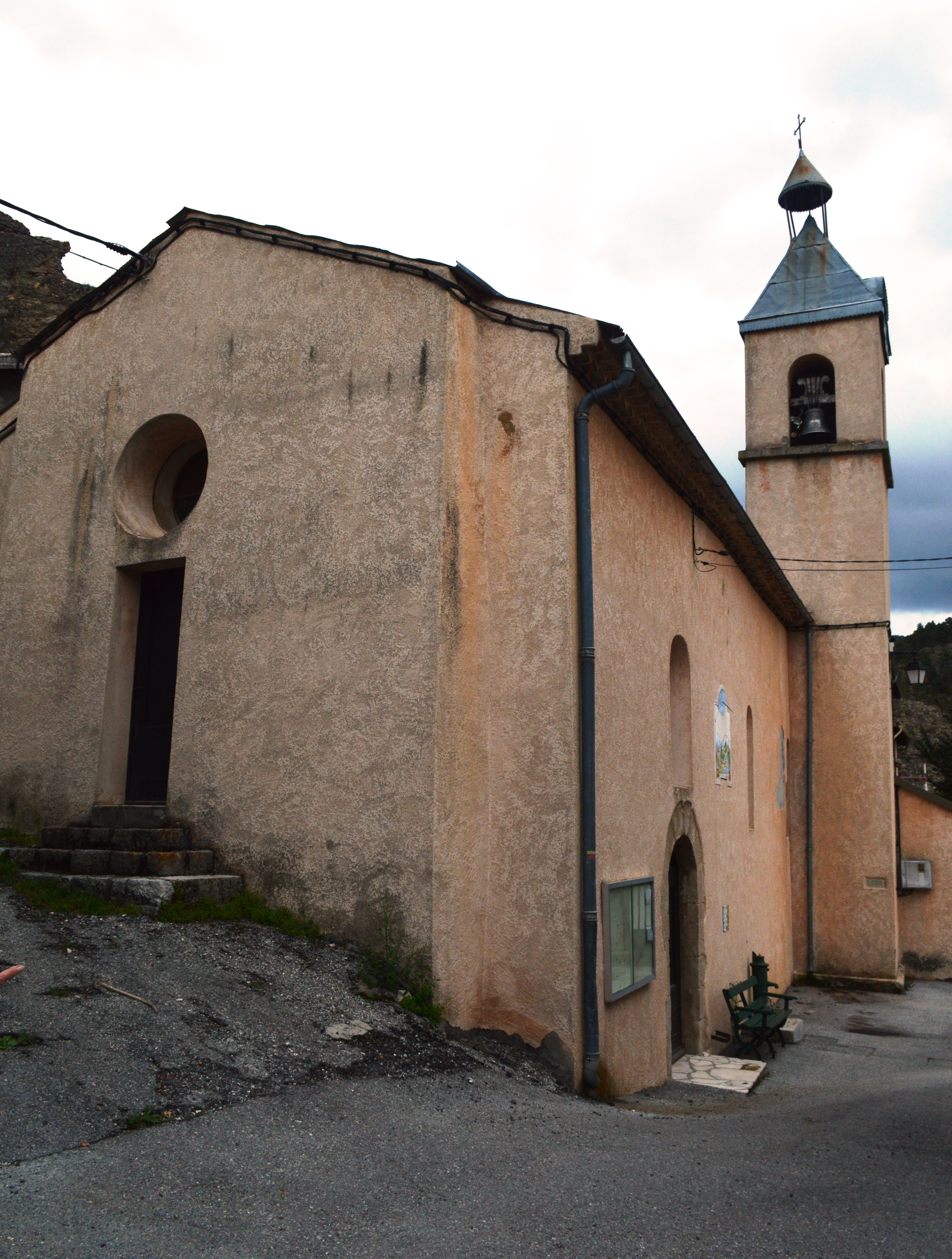
The Church of Saint Martin

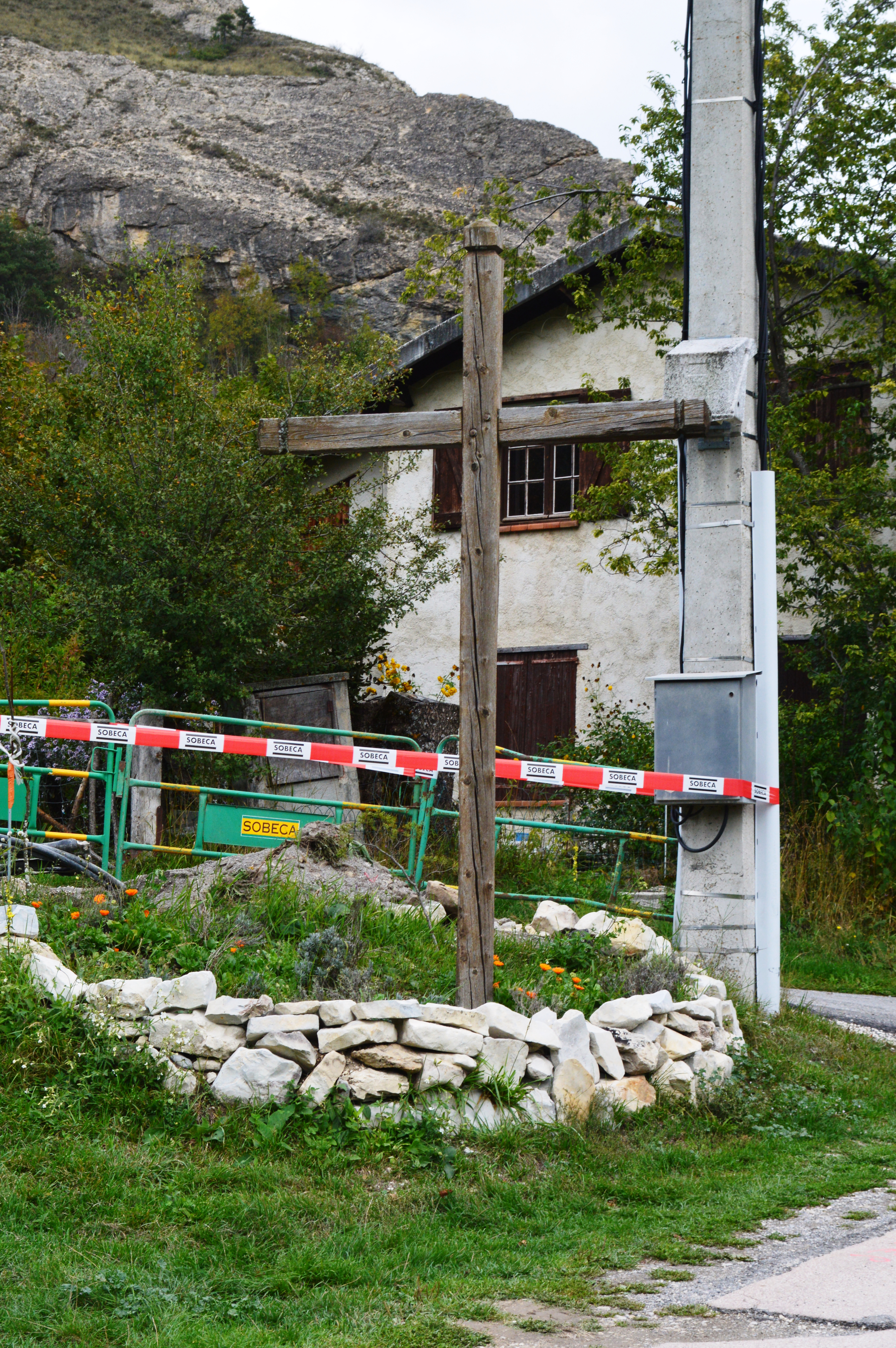
A Wayside Cross in Allons

The commune has many religious buildings and structures that are registered as historical monuments:

- The Chapel of Saint Martin (in ruins) (20th century).
- The Chapel of Saint Domnin. The Chapel contains several items that are registered as historical objects:
  - A Statuette of the Child Jesus (19th century)
  - The Furniture in the Chapel of Saint Domnin (18th century)
- The Parish Church of Saint Martin (1862) The church contains a very large number of items that are registered as historical objects. Some of the more interesting items are:
  - a bust-reliquary of Saint Domnin, the first Bishop of Digne, carved and gilded, placed on procession stretchers and saved from destruction in 1745
  - a Monstrance in the shape of the sun (19th century), embossed and carved in silver
  - a golden chalice (19th century)
  - an ornate silver chalice signed Dejean (19th century)
  - several paintings by Fidèle Patritti:
    - The Resurrection (1851)
    - The Annunciation, (before 1858)
    - The donation of the Rosary (1851)
  - A scene of Saints Domnin and Martin admiring the Sacred Heart, created before 1858
  - a small statue of St. Joseph (1856)
  - a small statue of the Virgin and Child (1881)
- Oratories and Wayside Crosses (19th century)
- The Church of Saint-Clair de Gouts (13th century)

== Notable People linked to the commune ==
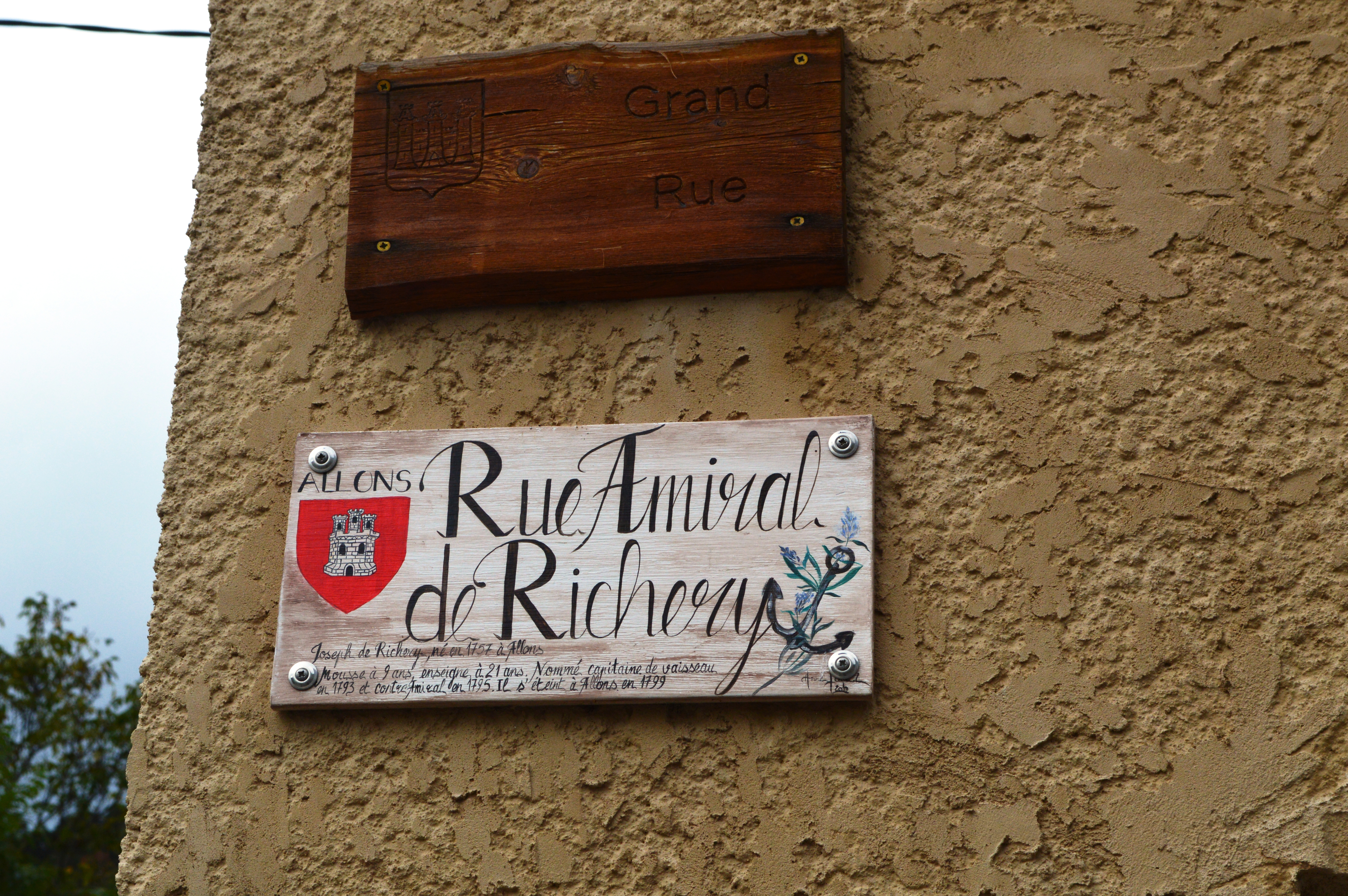
Plaque commemorating Joseph de Richery

- Jean-Jacques Béraud, born in Allons in 1753 and died in Cartagena in 1794, a priest and hydraulic engineer
- Joseph de Richery (1757-1798), Rear-Admiral, born and died in Allons
- Charles Alexander Richery born in Allons, Bishop of Fréjus (1823-1829), and Archbishop of Aix-en-Provence

== See also ==
- Communes of the Alpes-de-Haute-Provence department

=== Bibliography ===
- Raymond Collier, Haute-Provence monumental and artistic, Digne, Jean Louis Printing, 1986, 559 p. (in French)
- Under direction of Édouard Baratier, Georges Duby, and Ernest Hildesheimer, Historical Atlas. Provence, Comtat Venaissin, principality of Orange, County of Nice, Principality of Monaco, Librairie Armand Colin, Paris, 1969 (in French)
