= Raids on Boulogne =

Part of the War of the Second Coalition (1801)

Raid on Boulogne
- Part of the naval operations during the War of the Second Coalition
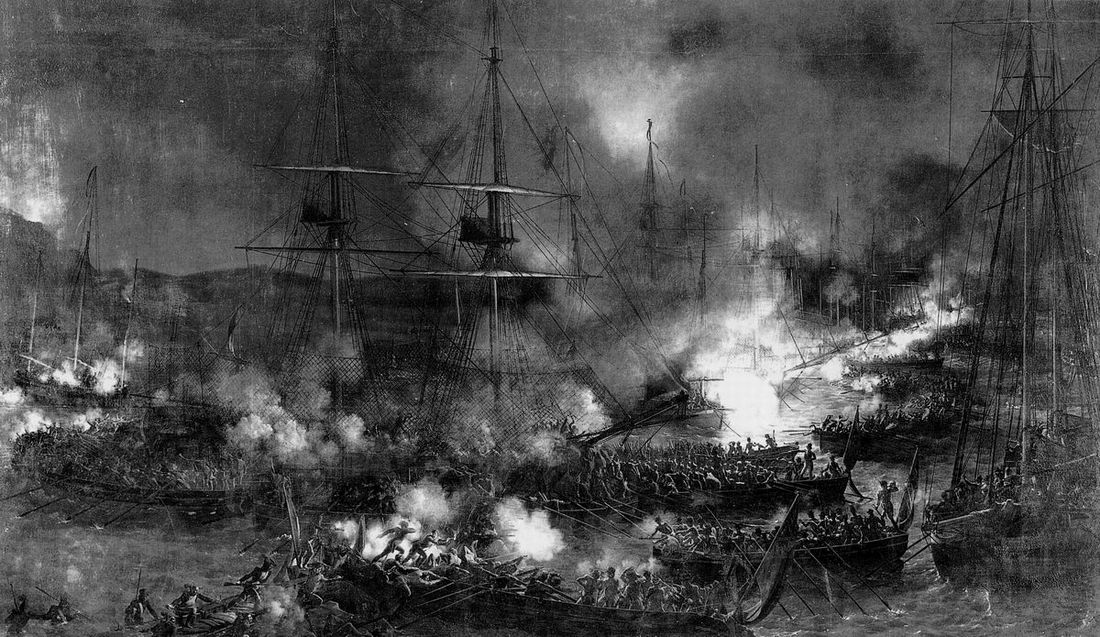
- Nelson fails against the flotilla near Boulogne - 15th of August 1801, by Louis-Philippe Crépin (1772 Paris – 1851)
Date	4 and 15–16 August 1801
Location	Boulogne 50.7264°N 1.6147°E
Result	French victory

Belligerents
United Kingdom	France

Commanders and leaders
Horatio Nelson	(France) Latouche Tréville

Strength
6 ships of the line 7 frigates 11 sloops-of-war 7 bomb vessels 32 brigs large number of gunboats	24 brigs and lugger-rigged flats 1 schooner

Casualties and losses
44 killed 126 wounded 6 gunboats sunk 20 men captured 4 deserted	10 killed 30 wounded 2–4 luggers sunk

The raid on Boulogne in 1801 was a failed attempt by elements of the Royal Navy led by Vice Admiral Lord Horatio Nelson to destroy a flotilla of French vessels anchored in the port of Boulogne, a fleet which was thought to be used for the invasion of England, during the French Revolutionary Wars. At dawn on 4 August, Nelson ordered five bomb vessels to move forward and open fire against the French line. Despite the inferior gunpowder of French artillery and the high number of shots fired by the bomb vessels, the British sustained more casualties and withdrew. The night of 16 August Nelson returned and tried to bring off the flotilla, attacking with seventy boats and nearly two thousand men organized into four divisions, but the attack was successfully repelled by the defenders, led by Admiral Latouche Tréville.

== Background ==
In February 1801 the continental war against the French Republic ceased by a treaty of peace concluded at Lunéville on 9 February between that country and the Austrian Empire, who accepted the French control up to the Rhine and the French client republics in Italy and the Netherlands. In March the British government made the first peace proposal to the French, but the collapse of the League of the North due to the death of the tsar Paul I and the French reversals in Portugal and Egypt caused an improvement of the British strategic situation, and the peace negotiations dragged on through the spring.

Because of this, the unemployed French armies gathered at the Channel ports, and the preparation for an invasion began. On 12 July Bonaparte issued an order for the assemblage at Boulogne of nine divisions of gun-vessels and of the same number of battalions of troops, besides several detachments of artillery to serve the guns on board the flotilla. Rear-Admiral Latouche Tréville was appointed the commander in chief and was given directions to exercise the troops in ship-working, in firing the guns, in boarding and in getting in and out of the vessels. Concentrations of troops and flat-bottomed boats were also reported at the ports of Le Havre and Dunkirk. These preparations were exaggerated by the French journals, including the official French government newspaper, Le Moniteur, which published the first consul's threat of invasion on 21 June. In fact, Bonaparte's only objective was to intimidate the British government into accepting disadvantageous peace terms.

Although the British intelligence doubted that the French invasion would take place, the counter-invasion orders of 1797 were reintroduced. The number of sloops and gun brigs in the Channel Islands were increased. In the southern counties cattle were driven inland, and main roads were blocked. Nelson, who recently returned from the Baltic, received detailed instructions of the admiralty to be employed in the defence of the mouths of the Thames and Medway, and all parts of the coast of Sussex, Essex and Kent. He was also required to block up or destroy, if practicable, the French vessels and craft in the ports wherein they may be assembled. All the intelligence pointed to Boulogne as the main port in which the French invasion craft were gathering, so Lord Nelson set course to there.

== First attack ==
Nelson, with the 18-pounder 32-gun frigate HMS Medusa under Captain John Gore as flagship, arrived at the port of Boulogne the evening of 3 August. He placed his 28 gunboats and five bomb vessels at a distance of 3 km from the port, out of range of the French army land batteries above and beside Boulogne. At 5 am the next day the division of bomb vessels was placed ahead of the rest of the squadron and the attack began, although Nelson was aware that a long-distance naval bombardment was unlikely to be decisive.

The five bomb vessels bombarded the French defensive line moored in front of Boulogne for 16 hours, firing between 750 and 848 shots. The French forces were unable to respond to the British fire because of the poor state of their gunpowder. As a result of this, Latouche Tréville considered moving towards the British ships to board them, but finally refused this plan because of the poor construction of his gunboats.

Finally, Nelson, seeing that the bombardment caused only minor damage, returned to England. He reported three flats and a brig sunk and the driving of several others on shore; however, Latouche Tréville only admitted two gunboats sunk, one of which was later recovered. The British lost 4 or 5 men and two gunboats, one of which exploded when its mortar burst.

After this first attack Nelson was conscious that the French flotilla did not pose any serious risk.

== Second attack ==
For his second attack, Nelson was unable to do a bombardment because the first attack and the preparations for the second along the Kent coast had alerted the French. Admiral Latouche-Tréville had reinforced his vessels with three battalions of soldiers from the brigades 47th, 56th and 108th, as well as nets, to prevent boarding. Nelson decided to launch a surprise night attack, as he had previously in the Battle of Santa Cruz de Tenerife (1797). For this purpose he organized four divisions of boats under the respective commands of Captains Philip Somerville, Edward Thornborough Parker, Isaac Cotgrave, and Robert Jones, and a division of mortar-boats, under Captain John Conn, to attempt to bring off the French flotilla.

At about 11 h. 30 m. pm the four divisions, who had crossed the Channel tied together, put off from the Medusa in good order, but they lost touch with each other because of the darkness of the moonless night. The tidal current and the half-tide separated them further, causing Robert Jones's division to be swept past the French vessels and saw no action. The other three divisions attacked different parts of the French line separately and at different times.

The first division, under Captain Somerville, approaching the shore, was swept away by the current to the eastward of Boulogne bay. Somerville, finding impossible an attack on the French vessels in the order prescribed, ordered the boats to cast each other off to move more easily. Shortly before the dawn of the following day, some of his leading boats attacked a French brig near Boulogne pier and tried to carry it away, but she was moored with chains that could not be cut. The French heavy fire of musketry and grapeshot from the shore defenses, three luggers, and a second brig located very close to the first, forced Somerville's forces to withdraw leaving behind his prize.
