= Action of 25 February 1781 =

Naval engagement

- Part of the American Revolutionary War
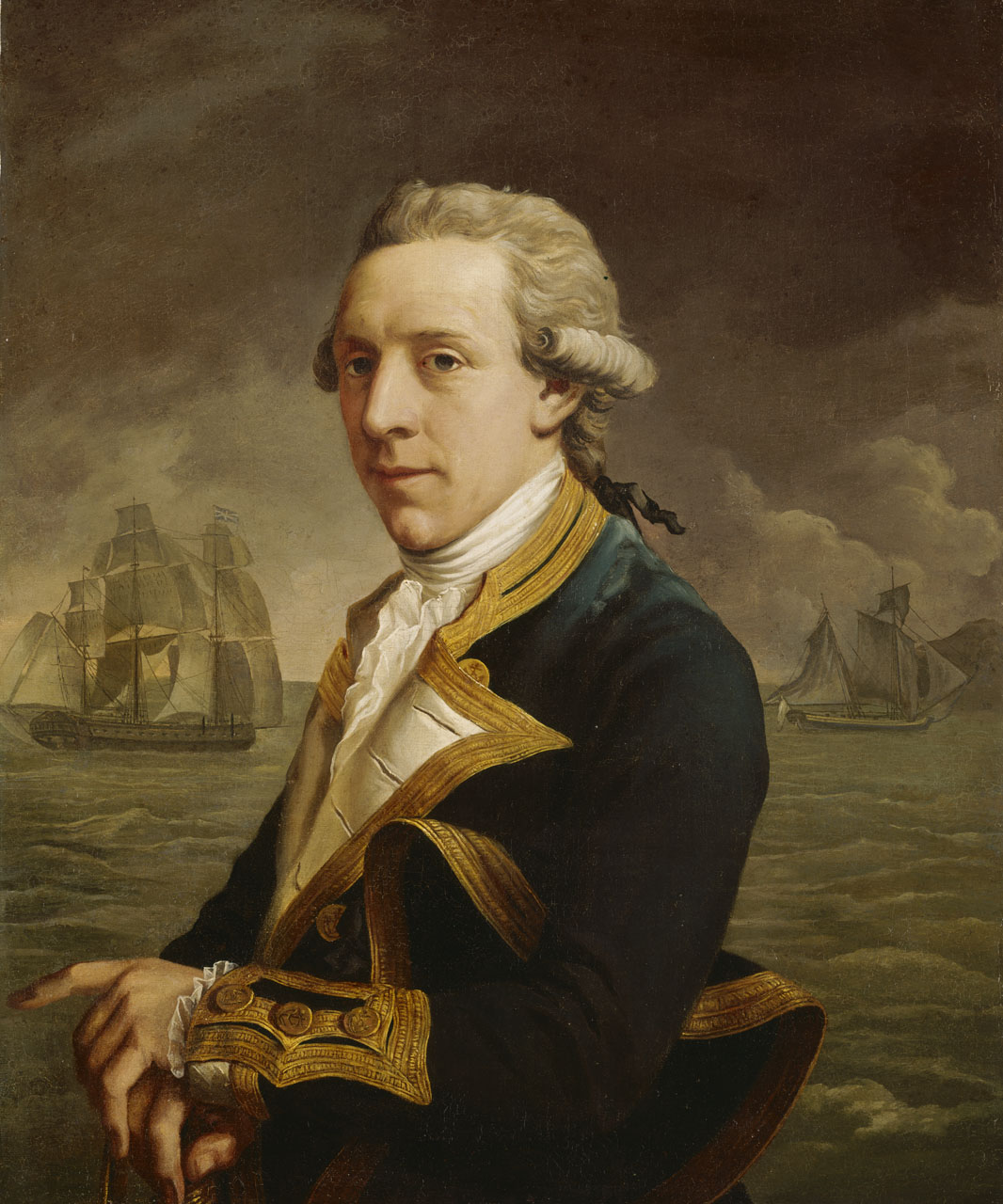
- Captain Robert Mann
Date	25 February 1781
Location	off Cape Finisterre, Spain
Result	British victory

Belligerents
Great Britain	Spain

Commanders and leaders
Robert Mann	Nicolás de Medina

Strength
1 frigate	1 frigate

Casualties and losses
2 wounded	6 killed 17 wounded 135 captured 1 frigate captured

The Action of 25 February 1781 was a naval engagement fought off Cape Finisterre between the Spanish naval frigate sixth rate Graña of 30 guns and the Royal Navy fifth-rate frigate HMS Cerberus of 32 guns. Graña surrendered after a hard fight.

On 25 February 1781, whilst cruising 20 leagues off Cape Finisterre, HMS Cerberus, under Captain Robert Mann, sighted Graña.

Graña, under Don Nicolás de Medina, was a month out of Ferrol but had captured little. Cerberus closed on Graña and within fifteen minutes the British had won. The Spanish officers fought as long as they could, but as Cerberus's broadsides took effect the Spanish sailors refused to fight. Further resistance seemed pointless, so De Medina struck Graña's colours.

In the action with Cerberus, Graña lost her first lieutenant and six men killed, and seventeen men wounded, out of her crew of 166 men; the British suffered only two men wounded. The Royal Navy took Graña into service as HMS Grana. Following his victory, Captain Mann received command of the 64-gun HMS Scipio.

== Citations and references ==
Citations

References

- Allen, Joseph (1852). Battles of the British Navy, Volume 1. Bohn's illustrated library. ASIN B009ZMMQ56.
- Clowes, William Laird (2003). The Royal Navy: v. 4: A History - From the Earliest Times to 1900. Chatham Publishing. ISBN 978-1861760128.
