= Newfoundland expedition =

1796 expedition of the War of the First Coalition

Coordinates: 52°37′28″N 59°41′06″W

- Part of the War of the First Coalition
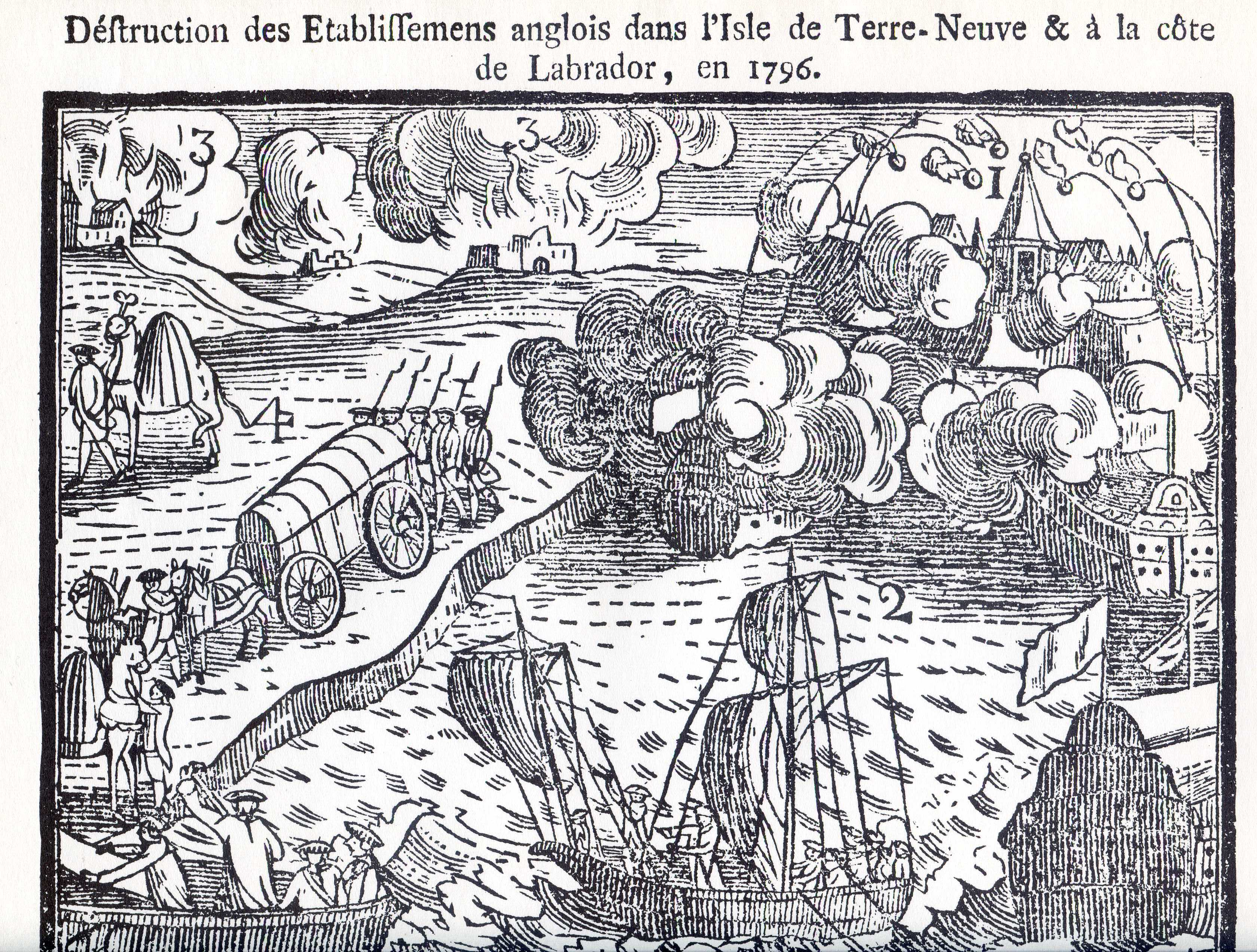
- French illustration of the expedition
Date	28 August–5 September 1796
Location	Newfoundland, Labrador and Saint Pierre and Miquelon
Result	Franco-Spanish victory

Belligerents
France; Spain	Great Britain: Newfoundland

Commanders and leaders
Joseph de Richery; José Solano y Bote	Sir James Wallace

Strength
17 ship of the line 3 frigates 1,500 regulars ~7,000 sailors	1 ship of the line 2 frigates 2 sloops-of-war

Casualties and losses
Unknown	~600 captured 127 merchantmen captured, sunk or destroyed

The Newfoundland expedition (French: Expédition à Terre-Neuve, Spanish: Expedición a Terranova) was a series of fleet manoeuvres and amphibious landings in the coasts of Newfoundland, Labrador and Saint Pierre and Miquelon carried out by the combined French and Spanish fleets during the French Revolutionary Wars. This expedition, composed of seven ships of the line and three frigates under the orders of Rear-Admiral Richery sailed from Cádiz in August 1796 accompanied by a much stronger Spanish squadron, commanded by General Solano, which had the aim of escorting it to the coast of Newfoundland.

On 28 August 1796 this combined Franco-Spanish squadron of 20 vessels, carrying 1,500 regular troops, appeared off the coast of Newfoundland. Considerable alarm was occasioned in England by the first accounts of these events in Newfoundland, the news being to the effect that the French had actually landed 1,500 men at Bay Bulls and 2,000 at Portugal Cove in Conception Bay, from which they were marching against St. John's. The harbour of St. John's was defended by a number of fortifications and gun emplacements such as Fort Amherst, Chain Rock Battery, Fort Frederick, and the large star-fort known as Fort Townshend. At St. John's the local garrison of the Royal Newfoundland Regiment, the Royal Artillery, the Royal Newfoundland Volunteers, aided by most able-bodied men, established a camp atop Signal Hill at the beginning of September. A boom was constructed across the harbour and three fire ships prepared. French Admiral Joseph de Richery, decided not to land after he saw this force, and after hovering in the area for several days, he chose instead to land at Bay Bulls, 18 miles south of St. John's, on 4 September.

On 4 September the expedition entered the town of Bay Bulls, and there being no sufficient force to protect Newfoundland, it was ravaged with fire and destruction, and a great deal of mischief was done to the fisheries. After taking dozens of British prisoners, the combined fleet sailed toward Saint Pierre and Miquelon, which were held by the British at that time, and remained near the islands for two weeks, taking on water and preparing for the voyage back to France and Spain. The combined expedition destroyed over 100 fishing vessels from the Newfoundland fleet and burned fishing stations along the Newfoundland coast, including the base of the British garrison at Placentia Bay.

== Background ==
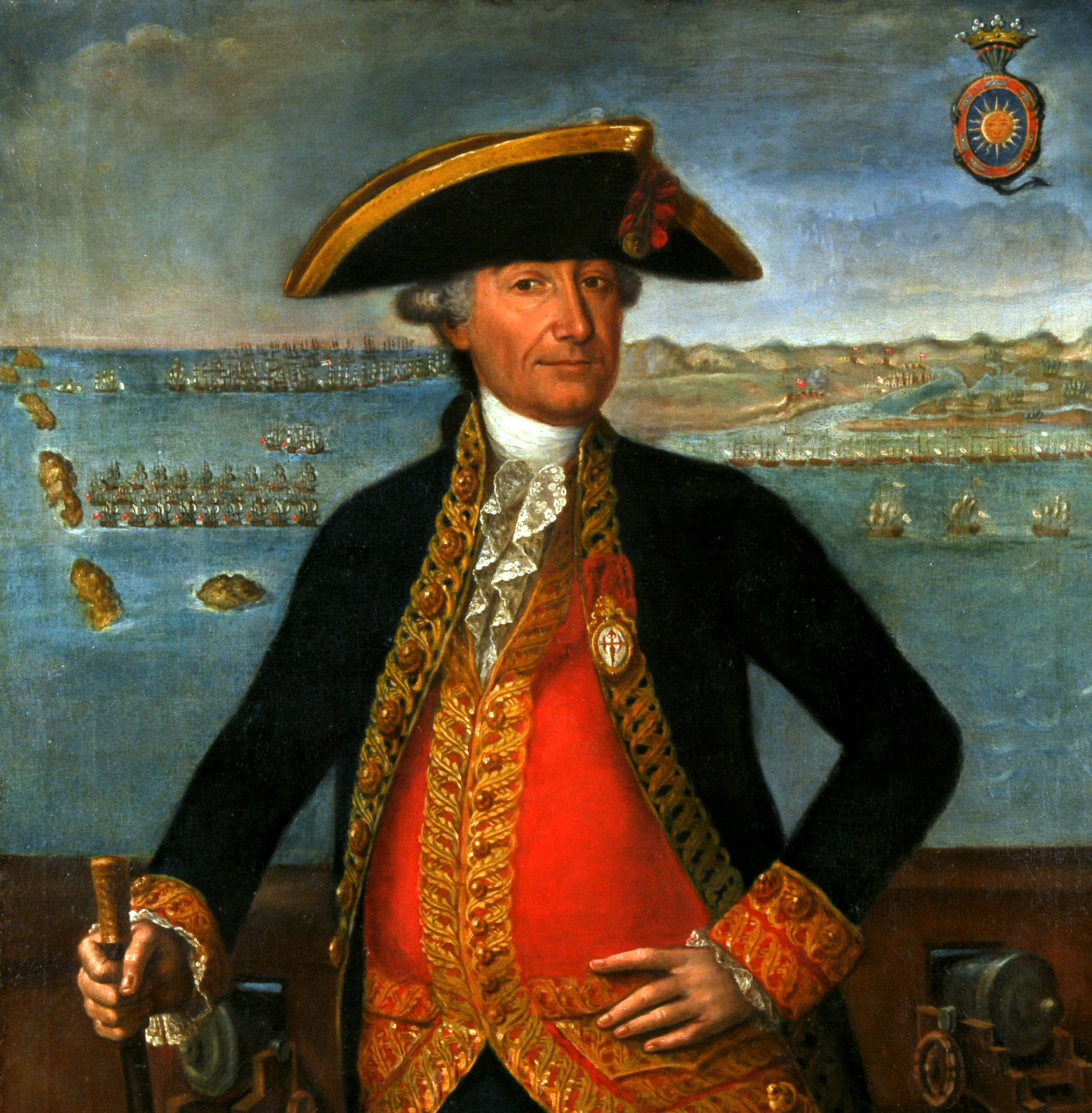
Portrait of José Solano y Bote

On 19 August a treaty of alliance, offensive and defensive, between France and Spain was signed at San Ildefonso, by which the latter power was to have a fleet in readiness to assist the French. The treaty was ratified in Paris on 12 September, and on 5 October a declaration of war by Spain against Great Britain was issued from Madrid. The fleet, under the command of Don Juan de Langara, put to sea from Cádiz. Ten sail of the line under the flag of Rear-Admiral José Solano y Bote were dispatched to join with a French force consisting of seven sail of the line and three frigates, under Rear-Admiral Richery, in an expedition against the British settlement of Newfoundland.

In August 1796, both Canada and Nova Scotia were stirred by the news that Admiral Richery had escaped the vigilance of Admiral Robert Mann out of Cádiz, and was proceeding to Newfoundland with seven sail of the line and several frigates. Against this force Vice-Admiral Wallace at St. John's could only oppose the old Romney of 50 guns, two 32's and two 16's. Captain Taylor, in Andromeda, of thirty-two guns, had parted for the banks with orders to cruise there for the protection of the sea trade. On 3 September he spoke with a schooner, the master of which informed him that he had seen on the coast an enemy's fleet, consisting of several ships of the line and frigates. Subsequent reports increased alarm on the mainland by telling of French landings in Conception Bay.

== Expedition ==
=== Failure on St. John's ===
Richery made for St. John's, estimating that with his superior firepower, he could pound Fort Amherst into submission. With the battery silenced, he could then force his way into the harbour to destroy the town. Outnumbered at sea, the British retired behind the forts and batteries of St. John's and prepared to put up stiff resistance. It was the morning of 2 September 1796 when the French fleet was sighted off the coast. Wallace did not have a large garrison in St. John's at the time, so he tried to give the impression that he had. This was intended to make the French believe that St. John's would be too costly to try to take. He had his men erect tents on both sides of the entrance to the Narrows and then marched them to and fro at Fort Amherst and below Signal Hill. Richery was handicapped by having no intelligence of the defenses of St. John's and no pilots for Newfoundland waters. He had to depend for information on John Morridge, master of a fishing ship belonging to Governor Wallace, who was one of the prisoners taken at Bay Bulls. Richery's huge fleet hove to off Cape Spear for a day observing the daunting sight. The next morning, Richery formed a battle line and drove for the harbour entrance. As they came within the range of the twenty-four pounders at Fort Amherst, his resolve weakened. Tacking the great ships, he headed back out to sea. The ruse had worked and the town saved. Admiral Richery's threat to St. John's finally came to nothing in face of the vigour of the new Governor, Admiral Sir Richard Wallace, who raised volunteers, strengthened the forts, and prepared new batteries.

In France, the public were informed that Richery had forced the surrender of St. John's and captured large quantities of shipping and sent more than a thousand sailors as prisoners to Santo Domingo. Not until October did authentic information reach England, when it was learned that the French admiral had given up the larger plan of an assault on St. John's and had left the coast on 29 September.

=== Bay Bulls ===
On 4 September the French squadron entered Bay Bulls. The town surrendered on their approach. Admiral Richery plundered and destroyed the entire settlement and shipping, including the fishing-stages, driving the inhabitants into the woods. 57 buildings and 47 fishing ships were captured along with more than 400 prisoners.

Burnt their stores and houses, Took their fish and oil, The hard-earned produce, Of their yearly toil.

=== Chateau Bay ===
On 5 September, Richery detached Adm. Zacharie Jacques Théodore Comte Allemand, to raid the Bay of Castles (Labrador) with Duquesne, Censeur, and Friponne while Richery himself proceeded to Saint Pierre and Miquelon with Victoire, Barras, Jupiter, Berwick, and Révolution 74s, and frigates Émbuscade and Félicité to visit a like treatment upon its shore establishments.

Delayed by head winds and fogs, M. Allemand did not enter the bay of Castles until 22 September, by which time most of the fishing vessels had departed for Europe. The French commodore sent an officer with a flag of truce demanding the surrender of the town. This was refused, but the approach of the squadron compelled the British commanding officer to destroy the fishing-stages.

=== Saint Pierre and Miquelon ===
Richery destroyed all the buildings, vessels, and fishing-stages he found at Saint Pierre and Miquelon, claiming the islands for France but leaving them unpopulated. Approximately 225 houses, 17 large scaffolds, 8 large buildings, 80 fishing boats and 80,000 quintals of cod were burnt to the ground. Admiral Richery hoisted the French flag on the island of St. Pierre, which had surrendered to a force from Halifax years before, but had been left without a garrison, though a number of British fishermen had taken possession and built a town. Richery's squadron then divided, and a portion sailed for the coast of Labrador to intercept the homeward-bound fishing fleet from Quebec while Admiral Richery remained near Cape Breton with four sail of the line and a frigate.

On 27 September, Admiral Murray arrived at Halifax from Bermuda. Although the information presented to him was still confused, the apparent lack of transports and troops indicated that the expedition was a raid rather than a serious attempt to take Newfoundland. Two days later, Allemand stood away from the coast, and, as Richery had already done, steered homeward. On 5 November, Richery, with his division, entered the port of Rochefort, and on the 15th Allemand with his reached Lorient.

== Aftermath ==
The combined fleets of France and Spain had destroyed upwards of 100 merchant vessels, and taken a great number of prisoners. Some were sent in a cartel to Halifax, and the remainder, about 300 in number, were carried into France and Spain. The British bank fisheries in Newfoundland recovered following the signing of the Treaty of Amiens in March 1802, and in that year, 71 Newfoundland and 58 British "banker" vessels prosecuted the fisheries on the Grand Banks. They declined again with the outbreak of war in 1803 and recovered somewhat after the Battle of Trafalgar in October 1805, but declined again during the Anglo-American war of 1812–14.

== Popular literature ==
The Spanish novelist Arturo Pérez-Reverte cites this expedition in one of his works, Cabo Trafalgar: un relato naval.

== See also ==
- Governors of Newfoundland
