= Robert Mann (Royal Navy officer) =

Royal Navy officer (1748–1813)

Admiral Robert Mann
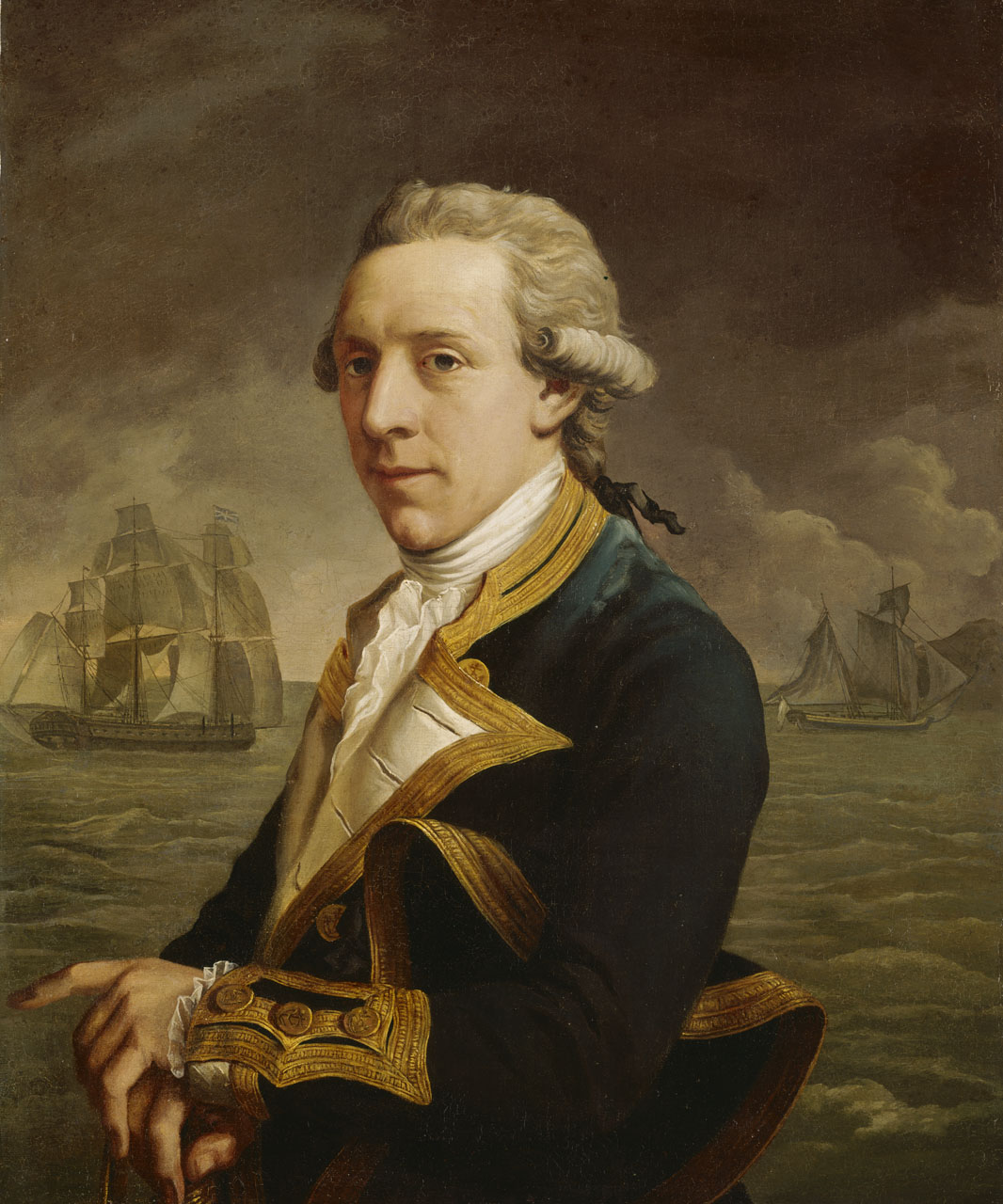
- Portrait by John Francis Rigaud, 1779
- Born: c. 1748; London, England
- Died: 20 September 1813 (aged 64–65)
- Military career
- Allegiance: Great Britain; United Kingdom
- Branch: Royal Navy
- Service years: –1813
- Rank: Admiral of the Red
- Commands: HMS Zephyr; HMS Alarm; HMS Cerberus; HMS Scipio; HMS Bedford
- Conflicts: American War of Independence; French Revolutionary Wars; Battle of Hyères Islands; Napoleonic Wars

Admiral of the Red Robert Mann (c. 1748 – 20 September 1813) was a Royal Navy officer who served in the American War of Independence and French Revolutionary and Napoleonic Wars.

== Early career ==
Mann was born into a naval family. His father, the elder Robert Mann, was a captain in the navy. He was mortally wounded while commanding HMS Milford during the capture of the French privateer Gloire on 7 March 1762, during the Seven Years' War. His son, the younger Robert Mann, was born in 1745, being baptised at Wandsworth on 18 July 1745. (This date is confirmed by his grave at All Saints Milford-on-Sea which shows his age as 68 when he died in 1813.) He embarked on a naval career and was commissioned as lieutenant on 26 May 1768, having been wounded in the neck by a musket ball in the action when his father was killed. The grave shows his name as Man rather than Mann, and that all his correspondence, as well as that of his father, used the same spelling.

== American War of Independence ==
On 24 June 1776, during the American War of Independence, Mann received a promotion to commander and given his first command, the 10-gun HMS Zephyr. Mann was promoted to post-captain on 30 May 1777 and appointed to command the 32-gun HMS Alarm in October that year, where he remained until April 1779.

Mann next assumed command of the 32-gun HMS Cerberus in July 1779. In 1780 Mann fell in with a Spanish fleet consisting of twelve sail of the line and several frigates under Don Joseph Solano. He followed the Spanish for several days, proceeding to give the earliest intelligence dispatches to Admiral Sir George Rodney, whom he found at anchor at Barbados. On 25 February 1781, whilst cruising twenty leagues off Cape Finisterre, he captured the Spanish 28-gun frigate Graña, under Don Nicolás de Medina. Graña was a month out of Ferrol but had not captured anything. In the action with Cerberus she lost her first lieutenant and six men killed, and seventeen wounded, out of her crew of 166 men. The Spanish officers fought as long as they could, but their men deserted them. Captain Mann in contrast was highly pleased with the behaviour of the officers and men of the Cerberus, only two of whom were wounded. From October 1782 until the end of the war, he commanded the 64-gun HMS Scipio.

== Years of peace ==
From June 1787 to April 1791 Mann commanded the 74-gun HMS Bedford.

== French Revolutionary Wars ==
Mann returned to take command of Bedford in January 1793, remaining there until late 1794 and participating in the Raid on Genoa. He was promoted to rear-admiral of the blue on 4 July 1794 and raised his flag aboard the 74-gun HMS Defence. He soon transferred his flag to the 74-gun HMS Cumberland and sailed from Portsmouth in March 1795, through the strait of Gibraltar to reinforce the Mediterranean Fleet under Admiral Sir William Hotham off the east coast of Menorca. Mann was promoted to rear-admiral of the white on 1 June 1795. After cruising for a short time, the British anchored in St. Fiorenzo Bay on 29 June and refitted their ships. Mann transferred his flag to the 100-gun HMS Victory on 7 July and took part in the Battle of Hyères Islands on 13 July 1795. Victory suffered considerable damage, having had her stays shot away, as well as much of the rigging. He transferred his flag to the 98-gun HMS Windsor Castle in December 1795. He was given command of a detached squadron in 1796 and sailed to Gibraltar with seven ships to watch the French fleet at anchor at Cádiz under Admiral Joseph de Richery.

He remained there for a month, before sailing to Toulon with supplies for Admiral Sir John Jervis's blockading fleet. With the Spanish entry to the war, a large Spanish fleet of twenty ships of the line as an escort for the French who planned to attack Newfoundland had already sailed. While returning to Gibraltar on 1 October Mann's squadron, accompanied by three transports and a brig, squadron sighted the Spanish fleet under Don Juan de Lángara in the south-east quarter. At 11 pm, helped by an easterly breeze, the Spanish bore up and captured the merchant brig and one of the transports, but Mann and his seven ships of the line managed to escape into Rosia Bay, near the mole of Gibraltar. Mann then held a conference with his captains, and decided not to return to the Mediterranean, but instead to sail north with a convoy, and then cruise off Cape Finisterre for a time. With his ships in poor condition after a long period at sea, Mann then returned to England to refit. Mann had no authority to make this decision, and it infuriated Jervis, who accused him of jeopardising the British strategy and forcing a temporarily withdrawal from the Mediterranean.

Mann was ordered to strike his flag and never again received an active command. He continued to be promoted according to his seniority, reaching vice-admiral of the white on 14 February 1799, vice-admiral of the red simultaneously with admiral of the blue on 23 April 1804, admiral of the white on 28 April 1808, and finally admiral of the red on 12 August 1812. He was appointed one of the Lords Commissioners of the Admiralty in 1798. He died on 20 September 1813.

The traditional view of Mann has now been superseded. The reality of Mann's situation off Cádiz is that misfortune led to misfortune: his quarry – a French squadron under Richery – came out but accompanied by a large, and no longer neutral, Spanish fleet. Starved of supplies, and unable to re-join Jervis and the Mediterranean Fleet, and with promises of support from home unfulfilled, he returned to England. His actions were misunderstood by Nelson (who otherwise regarded him highly), and seized upon by Jervis (forced to leave the Mediterranean because of a lack of a suitable base) eager for a scapegoat. Calmer minds prevailed at the Admiralty where he was appointed as a Lord Commissioner, scarcely a role for someone whose career had ended in ignominy. Indeed, his career only ended, along with many others, when Jervis was appointed First Lord of the Admiralty on the fall of Pitt in 1801. On his death at Pennington House in 1813, by then Admiral of the Red, he was buried in modest fashion – as per his will – at Milford.
