= HMS Bedford (1775) =

British ship of the line (1775–1817)

- Plan of Bedford

History

Great Britain
- Name: HMS Bedford
- Ordered: 12 October 1768
- Builder: Woolwich Dockyard
- Laid down: October 1769
- Launched: 27 October 1775
- Fate: Broken up, 1817
- Notes: Participated in: Battle of Saint Kitts; Battle of the Saintes; Battle of Cape St Vincent; Raid on Genoa; Battle of Genoa

General characteristics
- Class & type: Royal Oak-class ship of the line
- Tons burthen: 1606 (bm)
- Length: 168 ft 6 in (51.4 m) (gundeck)
- Beam: 46 ft 9 in (14.2 m)
- Depth of hold: 20 ft (6.1 m)
- Propulsion: Sails
- Sail plan: Full-rigged ship
- Armament: Gundeck: 28 × 32-pounder guns; Upper gundeck: 28 × 18-pounder guns; QD: 14 × 9-pounder guns; Fc: 4 × 9-pounder guns

HMS Bedford was a Royal Navy 74-gun third rate. This ship of the line was launched on 27 October 1775 at Woolwich.

== Early service ==
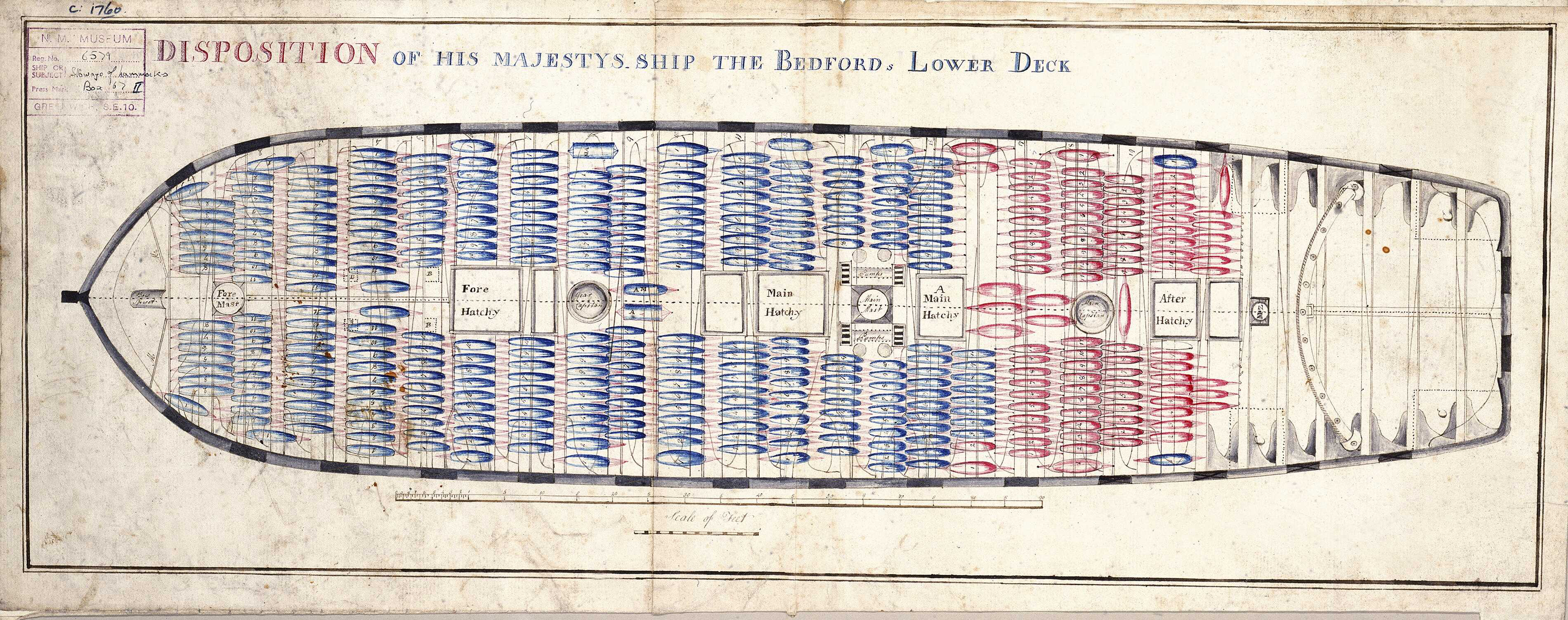
Hammock layout on Bedford's lower deck, it's thought that blue represents the sailors; and red, the marines.

At an unknown date on a cruise she captured American merchant ship Hanna; the prize arrived safely in England in early January 1778. In May 1778 Bedford was under the command of Capt. Edmund Affleck. In 1780, Bedford fought at the Battle of Cape St Vincent. Later, she was part of the squadron under Vice-Admiral Mariot Arbuthnot.

== American Revolutionary War ==
During the American Revolutionary War, Bedford, under the command of Captain Sir Edmund Affleck, fought in two engagements against the Comte de Grasse; at the Battle of St. Kitts (25–26 January 1782) under Admiral Samuel Hood, and the Battle of the Saintes (9–12 April 1782) under Admiral Rodney. Her crew was paid off and disbanded in the summer of 1783, and the vessel herself was put into ordinary.

Between 1787 and 1791, her captain was Robert Mann. Mann returned to take command of Bedford in January 1793, remaining with her until late 1794 and participating in the Raid on Genoa.

== French Revolutionary and Napoleonic Wars ==
In 1795 she was in the Mediterranean under Captain Davidge Gould. She was with Vice-Admiral Hotham's squadron off Genoa on 14 March when it captured Ça Ira and Censeur. During the engagement Bedford suffered such damage to her masts and rigging that she had to be towed out of the action. Bedford's casualties numbered seven men killed and 18 wounded, including her first lieutenant.

Bedford was also present on 13 July when the British fleet engaged the Toulon fleet in an indecisive action. Only a few British vessels exchanged fire with the French before they withdrew. If Bedford participated at all, she did not suffer any casualties. The British did capture one vessel, Alcide, but she caught fire and blew up.

In September 1795, Bedford was part of the force escorting 63 merchants of the Levant convoy from Gibraltar. The other escorts were the 74-gun ship HMS Fortitude, the frigates HMS Argo, the 32-gun frigates Juno and HMS Lutine, and the fireship Tisiphone, and the recently captured Censeur. The convoy called at Gibraltar on 25 September, at which point thirty-two of the merchants left that night in company with Argo and Juno. The rest of the fleet sailed together, reaching Cape St Vincent by the early morning of 7 October. At this point a sizable French squadron was sighted bearing up, consisting of six ships of the line and three frigates under Rear-Admiral Joseph de Richery. Eventually Censeur struck, and the remaining British warships and one surviving merchant vessel of the convoy made their escape. On 17 October Argo and Juno brought in to British waters their convoy of 32 vessels.

In 1797 Bedford saw action at the Battle of Camperdown under the command of Captain Sir Thomas Byard.

By 1799 she was out of commission at Plymouth. The next year she was fitted out there as a prison ship. Between September 1805 and October 1807 Bedford underwent extensive repairs and then was prepared for foreign service. In October she was commissioned by Captain James Walker. To man Bedford the Navy transferred over Bellerophon's petty officers and crew.

Bedford then joined Rear-Admiral Sir Sidney Smith who was assisting the Portuguese royal family in its flight from Lisbon to Rio de Janeiro. The flotilla that left Lisbon consisted of Marlborough, London, Monarch and Bedford, eight Portuguese ships of the line, four frigates, three brigs and a schooner, as well as many merchant vessels. Smith estimated the total number of Portuguese vessels as 37. The flotilla left on 11 November 1807 and reached Rio de Janeiro on 7 March 1808. While she was in Brazil Bedford was for a short time in 1808-9 under the command of Captain Adam Mackenzie (or M'Kenzie) of President.

== War of 1812 ==
In September 1814 Captain Walker took command of a squadron that carried the advance guard of Major General Keane's army, which was moving to attack New Orleans. Also present in the squadron were the troopships HMS Alceste, HMS Belle Poule, HMS Dover, and HMS Fox, and the warship HMS Norge. Bedford arrived off Chandeleur Island on 8 December 1814 and the troops started to disembark eight days later. Sir Alexander Cochrane and Rear-Admirals Pulteney Malcolm and Edward Codrington went ashore with the army. Between 12 and 14 December Bedford's boats, under the command of Lieutenant John Franklin, participated in the Battle of Lake Borgne, in which she lost one man killed and four or five men wounded, including Franklin and two other officers. In 1847 the Admiralty issued a clasp (or bar) marked "14 Dec. Boat Service 1814" to survivors of the boat service who claimed the clasp to the Naval General Service Medal. (Note: The 'Names of Ships for which Claims have been proved' are as follows: warships Tonnant, Norge, Royal Oak, Ramillies, Bedford, Armide, Cydnus, Trave, Seahorse, Sophie, and Meteor; troopships Gorgon, Diomede, Alceste, and Belle Poule.)

Bedford then contributed most of her officers and 150 men to land operations. During these operations Franklin helped dig a canal to facilitate the movement of troops. By default Walker became senior officer of the ships of the line, which were anchored 100 miles from the battle area as the waters were too shallow to permit these largest vessels to approach more closely.

== Post-war and fate ==
After news of the Treaty of Ghent, which had ended the war, arrived, Bedford and Iphigenia sailed to Jamaica. There they collected a home-bound convoy, arriving at Portsmouth on 30 May 1815.

In 1816 Bedford was out of commission at Portsmouth. She was broken up in 1817.
