= French ship Thésée (1790) =

Ship of the line of the French Navy

- Scale model of Achille, sister ship of French ship Thésée (1790), on display at the Musée national de la Marine in Paris.

History

France
- Name: Thésée
- Namesake: Theseus
- Ordered: 19 October 1787
- Builder: Rochefort
- Laid down: March 1788
- Launched: 14 April 1790
- In service: August 1790
- Out of service: 7 December 1804
- Renamed: Révolution on 7 January 1793; Finistère on 5 February 1803
- Fate: Broken up in 1816

General characteristics
- Class & type: Téméraire-class ship of the line
- Displacement: 3,069 tonneaux
- Tons burthen: 1,537 port tonneaux
- Length: 55.87 m (183 ft 4 in)
- Beam: 14.46 m (47 ft 5 in)
- Draught: 7.15 m (23.5 ft)
- Depth of hold: 7.15 m (23 ft 5 in)
- Sail plan: Full-rigged ship
- Crew: 705
- Armament: 74 guns: Lower gun deck: 28 × 36 pdr guns; Upper gun deck: 30 × 18 pdr guns; Forecastle and Quarterdeck: 16 × 8 pdr guns

Thésée was a 74-gun Téméraire-class ship of the line built for the French Navy during the 1780s. Completed in 1790, she played a minor role in the French Revolutionary Wars.

== Description ==
The Téméraire-class ships had a length of 55.87 metres (183 ft 4 in), a beam of 14.46 metres (47 ft 5 in) and a depth of hold of 7.15 metres (23 ft 5 in). The ships displaced 3,069 tonneaux and had a mean draught of 7.15 metres (23 ft 5 in). They had a tonnage of 1,537 port tonneaux. Their crew numbered 705 officers and ratings during wartime. They were fitted with three masts and ship rigged.

The muzzle-loading, smoothbore armament of the Téméraire class consisted of twenty-eight 36-pounder long guns on the lower gun deck, thirty 18-pounder long guns and thirty 18-pounder long guns on the upper gun deck. On the quarterdeck and forecastle were a total of sixteen 8-pounder long guns. Beginning with the ships completed after 1787, the armament of the Téméraires began to change with the addition of four 36-pounder obusiers on the poop deck (dunette). Some ships had instead twenty 8-pounders.

== Construction and career ==
Thésée was laid down at the Arsenal de Rochefort in March 1788. The ship was launched 14 April 1790 and completed the following August. The ship was renamed Révolution on 7 January 1793 and her crew mutinied in September. She took part in the French expedition to Ireland in 1796 under Pierre Dumanoir le Pelley. The ship was renamed Finistere on 5 February 1802. She was condemned on 6 December 1804 and was hulked on 7 January 1805.

== Bibliography ==
- Roche, Jean-Michel (2005). Dictionnaire des bâtiments de la flotte de guerre française de Colbert à nos jours [Dictionary of French Warships from Colbert to Today]. Vol. 1: 1671-1870. Roche. ISBN 978-2-9525917-0-6. OCLC 165892922.
- Winfield, Rif and Roberts, Stephen S. (2015) French Warships in the Age of Sail 1786-1861: Design, Construction, Careers and Fates. Seaforth Publishing. ISBN 978-1-84832-204-2
