= Bay Bulls (Newfoundland and Labrador) =

Body of water in Canada

Coordinates: 47.299°N 52.781°W

Bay Bulls is a natural bay off the island of Newfoundland in the province of Newfoundland and Labrador, Canada.
