= Joseph de Richery =

French Navy officer (1757–1798)

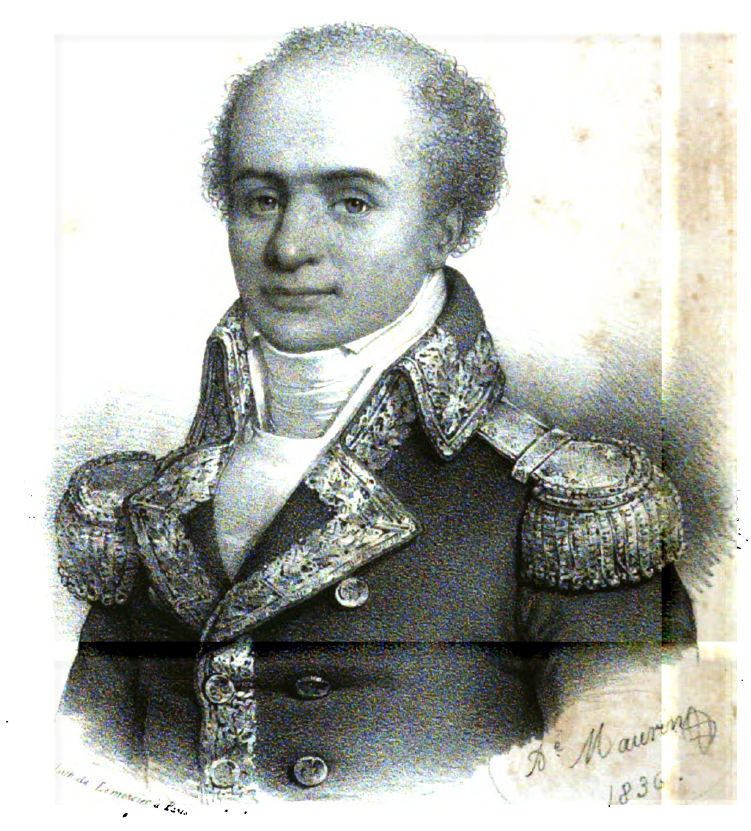
- Portrait by Antoine Maurin, 1835
- Born: 13 September 1757; France
- Died: 23 December 1798 (aged 41) Allons, France
- Allegiance: Kingdom of France; French First Republic
- Branch: French Navy
- Service years: –1798
- Rank: Counter admiral
- Conflicts: American Revolutionary War; French Revolutionary Wars; War of the First Coalition; Richery's expedition; Newfoundland expedition

Counter-Admiral Joseph de Richery (13 September 1757 – 23 December 1798) was a French Navy officer who served in the American Revolutionary War and French Revolutionary Wars.

== Life ==
Joseph de Richery was born on 13 September 1757 in France. He joined the French Navy and served with distinction in the American Revolutionary War, serving in the Indian Ocean from 1781 until 1785 under Vice-admiral Pierre André de Suffren. In 1793, de Richery was promoted to ship-of-the-line captain and given command of the 110-gun ship of the line Bretagne, but was relieved of his rank after the Quibéron mutinies in September. He was reinstated in 1794 at the rank of counter admiral.

In 1795, de Richery led a squadron of six ships of the line and three frigates which set out to raid British targets. The French navy utilised small squadrons to attack British commerce while avoiding confrontations with the larger Royal Navy. In one of its engagements, his squadron captured a convoy of 30 British merchantmen and one ship of the line, which they took to Cádiz; after arriving there, the French were blockaded by the British navy. In the same year, he captured another British convoy off Saint-Domingue.

De Richery launched the Newfoundland expedition in concert with the Spanish Navy in 1796, targeting the British Newfoundland Colony. His squadron landed at Bay Bulls in September 1796, capturing and burning numerous British colonial settlements and merchant vessels. De Richery's squadron also burned the abandoned British colony on Saint Pierre and Miquelon. The expedition captured, sunk or destroyed 127 British merchantman of all sizes. De Richery died in Allons on 23 December 1798.

== Notes and references ==
Bibliography

- Forrer, Claude (June 1996). "La Bretagne, vaisseau de 100 canons, 1762-1796". Neptunia (202): 13–21.
