= French ship Bretagne (1766) =

Ship of the line of the French Navy

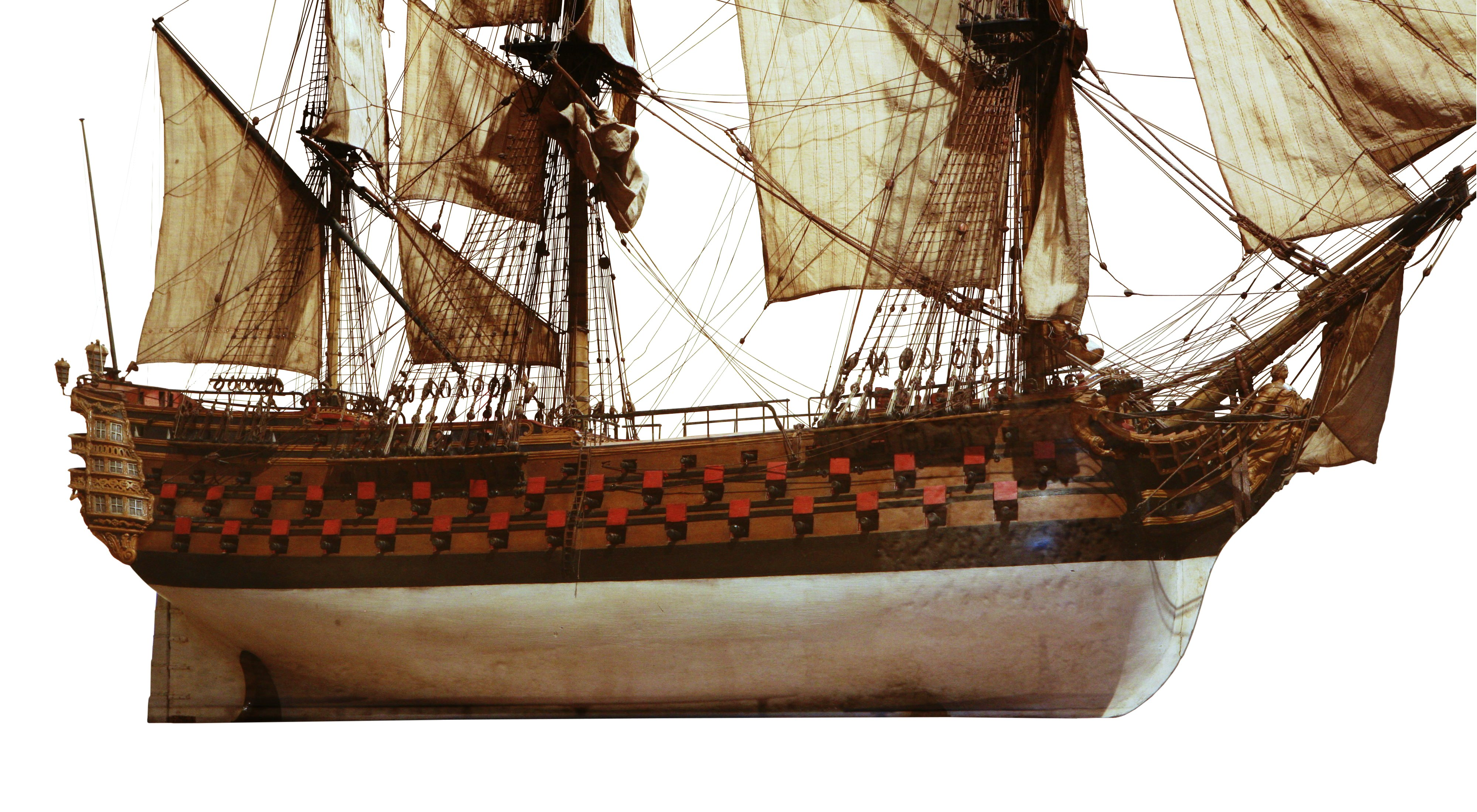
- Scale model of the Bretagne (MnM 13 MG 4), on display at Brest naval museum

History

France
- Name: États de Bretagne; Bretagne; Révolutionnaire
- Ordered: 1762
- Builder: Brest shipyard; Antoine Groignard
- Launched: 24 May 1766
- Commissioned: 1767
- Renamed: Renamed to Révolutionnaire in October 1793
- Fate: Broken up in 1796

General characteristics
- Displacement: 4666 tonneaux
- Tons burthen: 2600 port tonneaux
- Length: 56 m (184 ft); keel: 50 m
- Beam: 15 m (49 ft)
- Draught: 7.5 m (25 ft)
- Propulsion: Sails
- Sail plan: Full-rigged ship, 30.666 square feet
- Complement: 19 to 27 officers; 1070 to 1130 men
- Armament: 100 guns, increased to 110 in 1779; Lower deck: 30 36-pounders; Middle deck: 32 24-pounders; Upper deck: 32 12-pounders; Quarterdeck and forecastle: 16 6-pounders (6 originally, upgraded to 16 in 1779); 6 obusiers de vaisseau added in 1793
- Notes: 4 month autonomy.

Bretagne was a large 110-gun three-decker French ship of the line, built at Brest, which became famous as the flagship of the Brest Fleet during the American War of Independence. She was funded by a don des vaisseaux grant by the Estates of Brittany. She was active in the European theatres of the Anglo-French War and of the French Revolutionary Wars, notably taking an important role in the Glorious First of June. Later, she took part in the Croisière du Grand Hiver and was broken up.

== Context ==
The Seven Years' War had left the French Navy severely depleted, and the Crown did not have funds to replace the ships lost during the conflict. In late 1761 Étienne François, duc de Choiseul took the direction of the Navy and proposed that the great institutions of France make voluntary donations, a scheme named don des vaisseaux. On 1 September 1762, the Estates of Brittany gathered at the Couvent des Cordeliers in Rennes and decided to raise one million Livres tournois in order to offer a 100-gun Three-decker. Lieutenant Jean-Claude Louis de Quelen rode to Choisy-le-Roi to inform Louis XV, arriving on 5 and returning on 9 with acceptance letters from the King and from the Duke de Choiseul. Administrative dispositions for the loan started on 2 November, and were completed by 17. Budget would eventually reach 1,010,000 Livres tournois.

The donation had political connotations, both in terms of rivalry between the various donating institutions, and for the status of Bretagne within France. Therefore, the Estates of Brittany attached their gift to a number of requests: that the ship be named Bretagne rather than États de Bretagne, that the crew be composed of Bretons exclusively, and that the ship be a three-decker. Furthermore, rather than donate funds that the Crown would invest in construction, the Estates demanded to supervise construction themselves at the shipyards of the French East India Company in Lorient.

== Construction ==
On 2 November 1761, the Commission of the Estates of Brittany in charge of construction mandated Antoine Groignard as chief engineer, with Gaubry as deputy and Damel as an advisor. Groignard worked both for the French Royal Navy and for the French East India Company; he had recently directed the construction of the 80-gun Orient, the 74-gun Robuste, the 64-gun Vengeur and Solitaire, and was supervising ongoing construction of the 74-gun Diligent and Six Corps, the 56-gun Bordelois in Lorient, that of the 56-gun Utile, Ferme and Flamand in Bordeaux, and four frigates in Nantes.

On 17 November 1761, Groignard sent of proposal for a budget between 919,000 and 1,115,000 pounds. The shipyards in Lorient received their first orders in early December. Choiseul wrote the Groignard to congratulate him for his appointment, and to argue in favour of building an 80-gun two-decker, with 36-pounders on the lower battery and 24-pounders on the upper, although he conceded that political considerations mandated a three-decker. He also reminded of the shortcomings of Royal Louis, an unsuccessful 100-gun of the time.

Groignard hoped to complete construction by 1763, but delay in complete the 1-million load and difficulties in stocking construction wood soon set the schedule back. On 28 March 1763, Groignard sent completed plans to the construction commission, which failed to forward them to Choiseul. On 6 May, Choiseul wrote directly to Groignard to enquire, and setting further requirements that the artillery be set on the three batteries (limiting armament of the castles), and that autonomy be sufficient to feed 1,000 men for six months, with water for two. By July, construction was expected to be completed in 1765, and there were several exchanges of letters and budget estimations between various administrations and rival naval engineers, second-guessing Groignard and arguing about the furniture and spare parts needed for the ship.

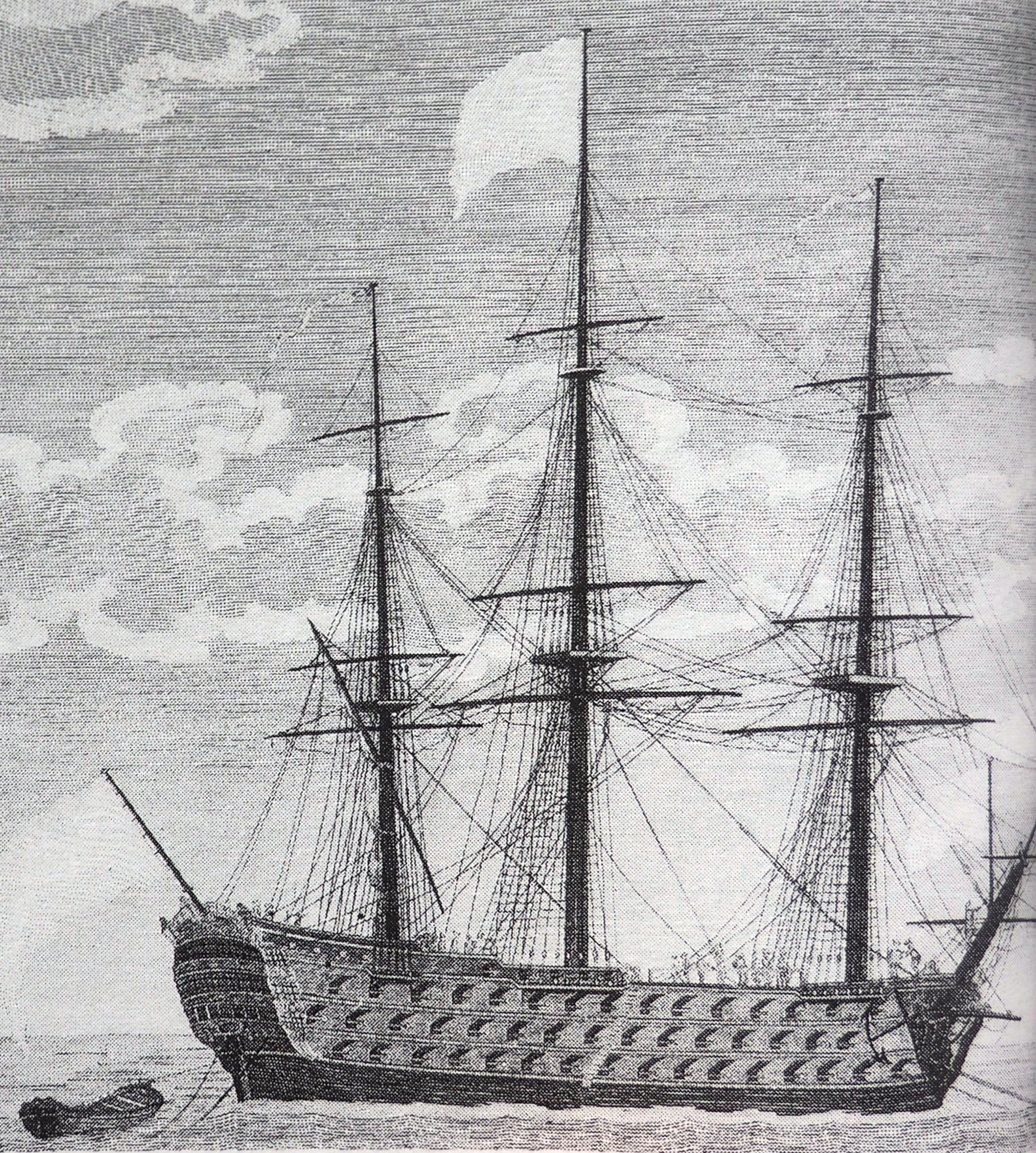
Depiction on Bretagne flying the white ensign of the Ancien Régime.

By 3 January 1764, the commission was requesting revised versions of the plans as to reduce the dimensions of Bretagne. On 23, Groignard submitted his new plans, along with a memorandum underlining that this version would not allow the ship to hold six month worth of food and was compromising her stability, speed and maneuverability; furthermore, he warned that the lower headspace of the gundecks in the smaller project would hinder evacuation of smoke from the guns in combat conditions. On 19 February, Choiseul declined to approve the revised plans and requested a third version; Groignard quickly completed the new plans and went directly to Paris himself to submit them, short-circuiting the construction Commission of the Estates of Brittany and talking Choiseul out of the notion that the lower battery could be armed with 24-pounders instead of 36-pounders to reduce the cost. On 7 May, Choiseul informed the Commission that his plans had met with approval and that the construction could begin.

The Commission then started procuring the raw materials needed for the construction, notably wood, fabric for the sails, iron and cables. Lacking experience in the matter, it requested advice from Roth, director of the East India Company in Lorient, who replied on 1 April with a long memorandum. Besides explaining how to assess the quality of the materials, how to transport it on land and how to store it, the memorandum observed that a number of parts would need to be obtained from outside of Bretagne, and sometimes even abroard, notably from the Netherlands. Providers would span from Newcastle to Saint Petersburg and Riga.

In August 1764, Groignard started laying down parts in Lorient shipyard, hoping to take advantage of the summer weather and of a moment of low activity by the East India Company. However, the fluyts needed to transport construction wood were damaged and a lack of wood and nails soon slowed down the work. In December, the Estates and the Company signed an understanding that Groignard would have access to the parts and materials stocked in the Company stores, and that the Estates would replenish them within three months. On 12 December, the keel was laid down, the bow had been assembled, and the frames were made and ready to be installed.

However, on 12 January 1765, the Commission ordered that the construction be halted, and summoned Groignard to Nantes. Realising its lack of competence, the commission had decided to cease procuring material directly and to delegate that task to the harbour mandated for the construction, which would be either Lorient or Brest. By March, Brest had won the contract;the ship was dismantled and her parts were brought to Brest in May 1765. Groignard remained in charge of the work, while the commission was little involved from then on.

On 5 July 1765, the keel was laid down in Brest in the upper dry dock of Pontaniou. By mid-July, the framing was completed. By mid-September, the hull was caulked. In late February 1766, carpenters had completed the orlop deck and were preparing construction of the first battery. In April, the sides were completed up to the lower battery, and the decks of the lower and middle batteries were installed. On 24 May 1766, Bretagne was launched.

Completion of the ship remained slow: although Bretagne was declared completed on 30 September 1767 and officially commissioned in 1768, work remained to be done to make her sea worthy in June 1770, and she spent the whole year of 1770 fitting out. On 30 November 1771, she was declared in need of an extensive refit.

== Career ==
In 1773, Bretagne was listed as serving in the Brest Brigade of the Ponant Division of the Navy. However, her state was deteriorating, and harbour director Count de Breugnon sent her to a dry dock, where she entered on 9 August. In 1775, Orvilliers took command of the Brest squadron and, finding her timbers rotten, petitioned Sartine for an extensive refit; reconstruction started on 1 September 1776, taking 480,000 pounds, and Bretagne was launched on 7 April 1777. She took two more months for fitting out.

=== Anglo-French War (1778–1783) ===
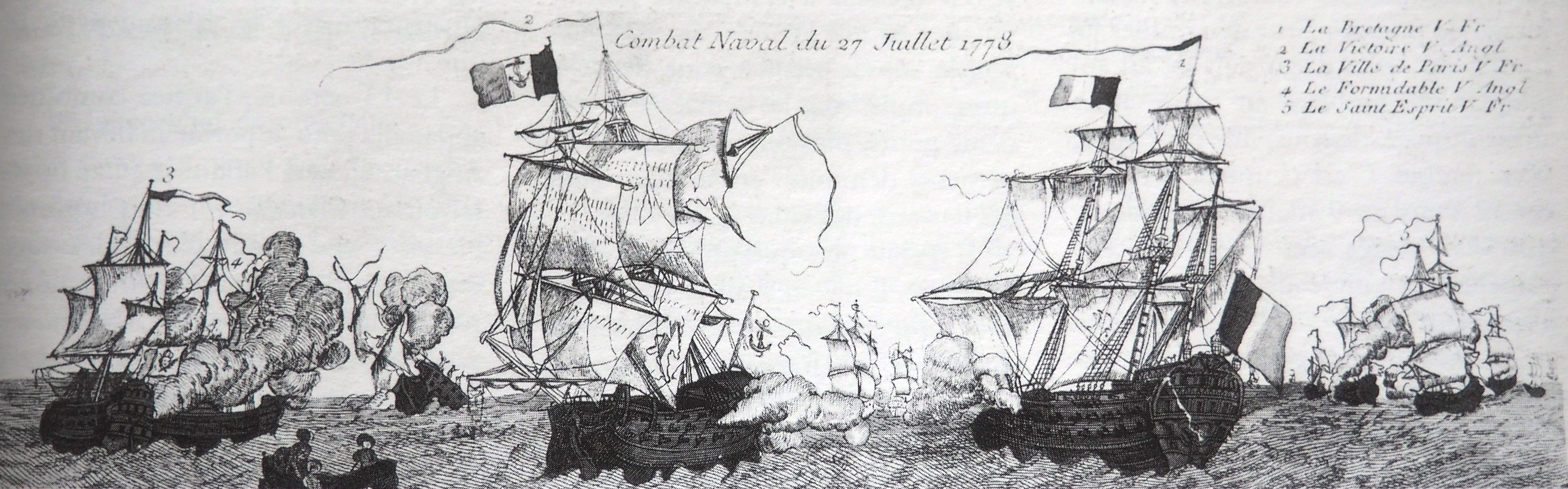
An incorrect representation of the Battle of Ushant depicting Bretagne fighting HMS Victory.

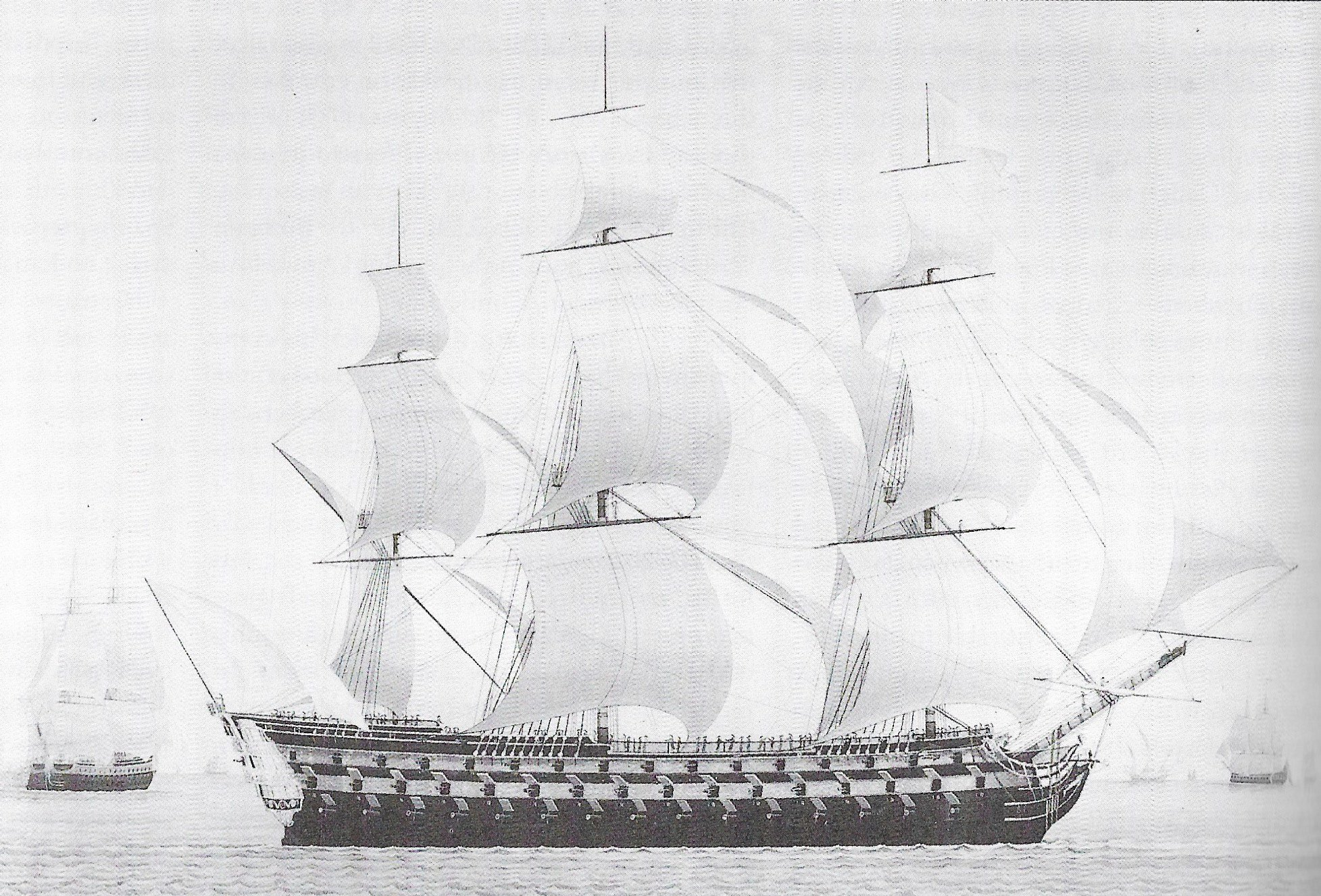
Representation of Bretagne circa 1782, Peabody Essex Museum, Salem, Massachusetts.

She took part in most of the engagements of the European theatre of the Anglo-French War, notably the Battle of Ushant in 1778, where she served as Orvilliers' flagship, with Parscau du Plessix as flag captain. She took part in the Armada of 1779, but an epidemic aboard forced her to return to Brest in September. In 1779, her armament was reinforced by adding 10 further 6-pounders to her quarterdeck, turning her into a 110-gun. On 2 September 1780, Bretagne left Brest for Cadiz, where she took part in the Great Siege of Gibraltar.

Although she had good nautical qualities, Bretagne had a tendency to leak and hog, and from February to April 1781, she underwent a refit in Brest and notably received a copper sheathing. Bretagne then undertook an expedition under Captain Soulange in Guichen's squadron in the Mediterranean and the Atlantic from 22 June to early September.

After spending three months in Brest, she sailed again on 12 December 1781. She sustained damage in foul weather, notably in a hurricane on 25 and 26 December. At her return to Brest, Bretagne was in need of serious repairs, and Guichen, to his chagrin, had to transfer his flag to Terrible. In 1782, her keel had hogged by 1'7" pied du roi. Bretagne was refitted in Brest from 2 March to July 1782, undergoing extensive repairs of her hull but losing her copper sheathing in the process.

On 8 July 1782, Bretagne departed Brest under Captain Charles Picot de Dampierre to join the Franco-Spanish combined fleet still besieging Gibraltar, arriving on 11 along with Invincible, Robuste, Protecteur, Actif, Zodiaque, Bien Aimé and Guerrier. Her cutter rescued men from the crew of the Spanish floating battery Talla Piedra on 13 September. Bretagne, under Dampierre, blockaded Gibraltar until 10 October, when a gale damaged her rigging, killing a helmsman and ripping anchors from the ship. On 13 October 1782, the fleet moved to intercept a British squadron, resulting in the Battle of Cape Spartel on 20 where Bretagne sustained 5 men wounded. Bretagne then returned to Cadiz harbour in preparation for an expedition to America under Admiral d'Estaing, but by then the Peace of Paris had been concluded and Bretagne returned to Brest.

Bretagne was refitted in Brest in 1788 until the end of the year. The poop deck was removed to improve stability.

=== French Revolutionary Wars ===
Bretagne was refitted in Brest from 1792 to June 1793, 6 obusiers de vaisseau being added that year. Under Captain Joseph de Richery, she became the flagship of Admiral Jean-Amable Lelarge. In September 1793, her crew was involved in the Quibéron mutinies; in reaction Jeanbon Saint-André had Lelarge destitued and Richery arrested, and Bretagne renamed to Révolutionnaire.

Captain Daniel Vandongen took command of Révolutionnaire and put her in good order. By 19 June 1794, she was coppered and fully armed.

On 16 May 1794, the fleet departed Brest. On 28, the British and French squadrons met, leading to the skirmishes that would culminate into the so-called Glorious First of June. The French line of battle was set in reverse order, and Révolutionnaire found herself at the rear, last ship in the line. She came in action against five or six 74-gun ships, notably HMS Russell, Bellerophon, Audacious and Leviathan, sustaining heavy damage and casualties. At 0930, a shot killed Captain Vandongen; as the first lieutenant was severely wounded and the second lieutenant has already been killed, third Lieutenant Renaudeau assumed command, but he too was incapacitated almost immediately, and Fourth Lieutenant Dorré had to take over. Révolutionnaire was isolated and defenceless, and avoided capture mostly thanks to Admiral Howe's order to his ships to regroup. (Note: A rumour states that Révolutionnaire struck her colours at some point, which her officers disputed.) In the night, Révolutionnaire lost her mizen and her mainmast. The next day, she met Audacieux and Unité, of Nielly's squadron; Audacieux took Révolutionnaire in tow and brought her to Île-d'Aix, where she arrived on 8 June with 160 crewmembers killed or wounded.

Révolutionnaire was fully repaired and rigged anew at Île-d'Aix, which entailed the construction of a workshop specially for that purpose, as well as bringing all parts from Rochefort. She was ready again on 7 August 1794, and rejoined Brest on 27 of the same month.

On 29 December 1794, under Captain Louis-Marie Le Gouardun, (Note: Sometimes written Leguardun.) Révolutionnaire departed from Brest for the Croisière du Grand Hiver, where she sustained severe structural damage from the foul weather. She limped back to Brest on 2 February 1795, her hull leaking heavily. Too damaged in the Croisière du Grand Hiver to be repaired, she was struck on 28 January 1796 and broken up between January and May 1796.

== Legacy ==
A scale model of the Bretagne is on display at Brest naval museum (MnM 13 MG 4). Admiral François-Edmond Pâris states that it was built by of under supervision from Forfait around 1780. The model depicts Bretagne in her 1777 state (no coppering yet, but already 16 guns on the castles, 10 on the quarterdeck and 6 on the forecastle). The ornaments are not quite realistic: the aft is overly decorated compared to the drawings to master sculptor Lubet, and the figurehead is a woman carrying the arms of Bretagne, reflecting a project that was never realised in reality. The actual figurehead featured a lion carrying the arms of Bretagne.

Bretagne is depicted on the painting Vue du port de Brest en 1793 by Jean-François Hue.

Representations of Bretagne in Vue du port de Brest
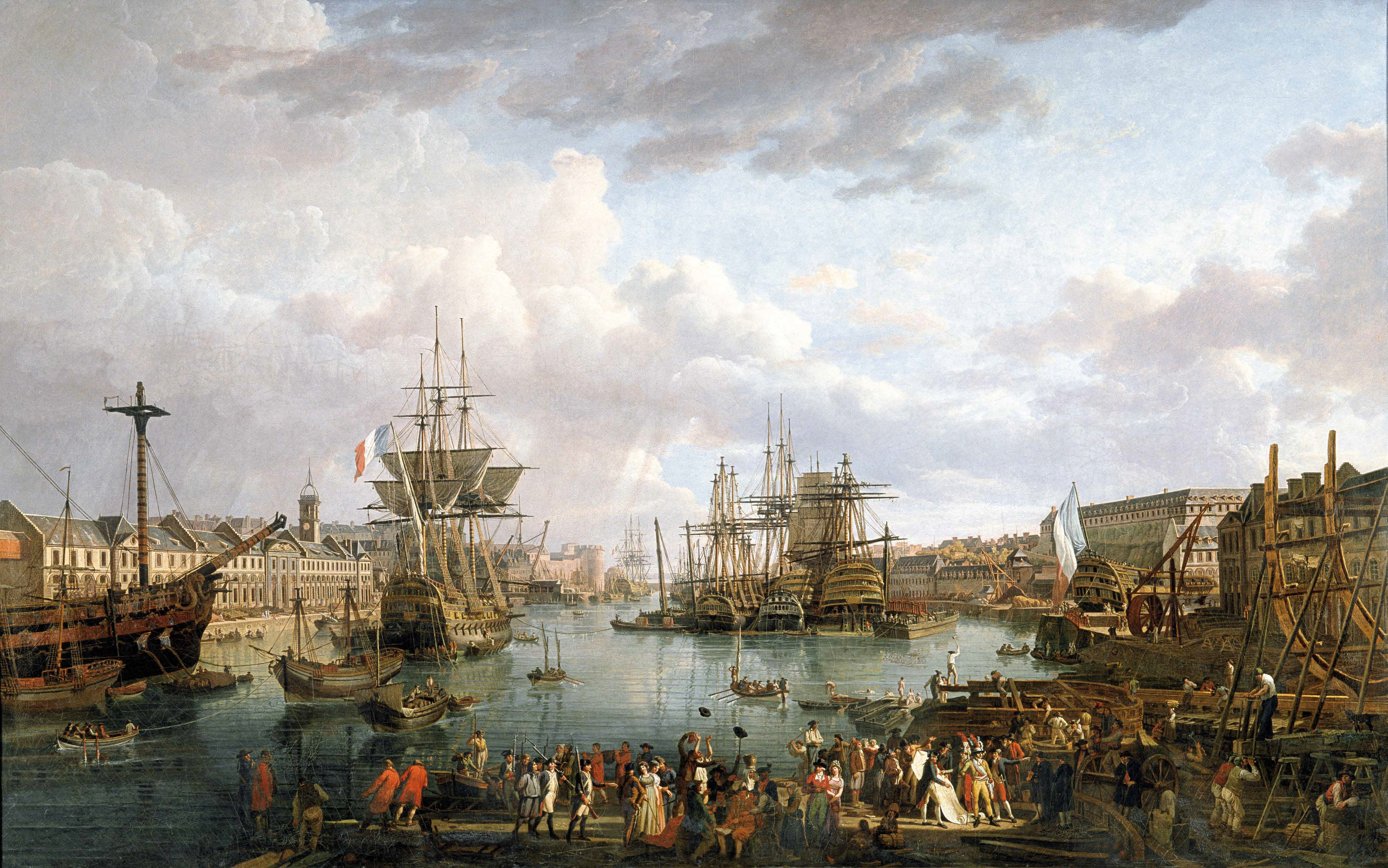
View of the Port of Brest by Jean-François Hue

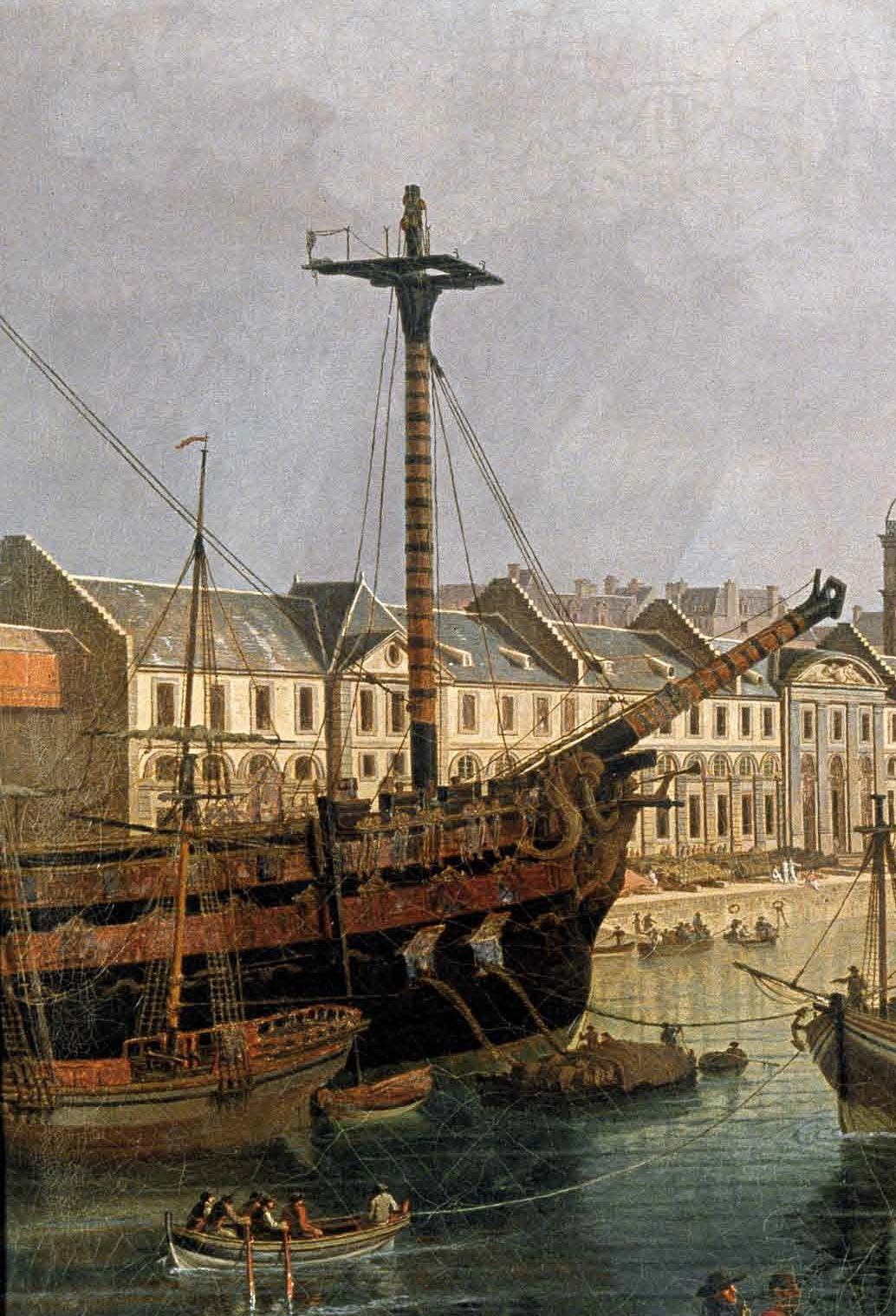
Bretagne, detail of Vue du port de Brest by Jean-François Hue

Claude Forrer published a plan of Bretagne by master sculptor Lubet in Neptunia 202 in June 1996.

Lubet's representation of Bretagne
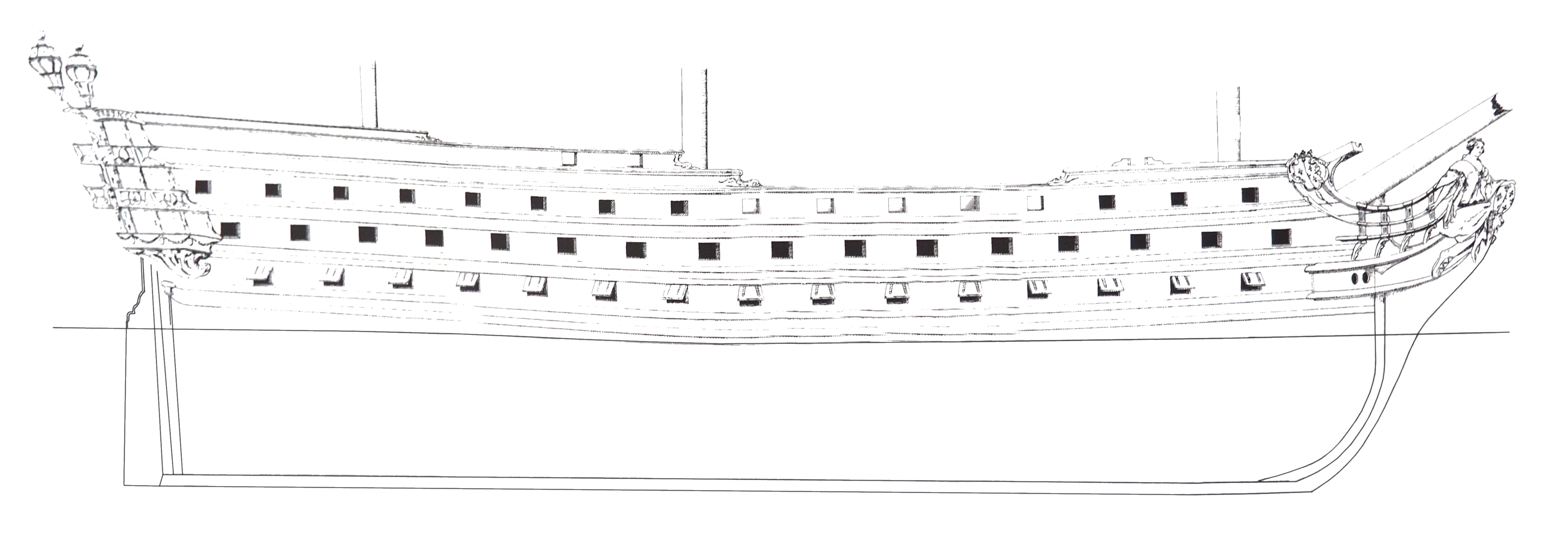
