= List of ship launches in 1763 =

The list of ship launches in 1763 includes a chronological list of some ships launched in 1763.

Date	Ship	Class	Builder	Location	Country	Notes
12 January	Vulture	Swift-class sloop	Humprhey Davis	Northam	Great Britain	For Royal Navy.
14 February	Talbot	East Indiaman	John Perry	Blackwall	Great Britain	For British East India Company.
15 February	British King	East Indiaman	John Wells	Deptford	Great Britain	For British East India Company.
1 March	Swift	Swift-class sloop	John Greave	Limehouse	Great Britain	For Royal Navy.
31 March	Defence	Bellona-class ship of the line		Plymouth Dockyard	Great Britain	For Royal Navy.
15 April	Ramillies	Ramillies-class ship of the line	Edward Allin	Chatham Dockyard	Great Britain	For Royal Navy.
16 April	Prindsesse Sophia-Magdalena	Fourth rate		Copenhagen	Denmark-Norway	For Dano-Norwegian Navy.
26 April	Bordelois	Bordelois-class ship of the line	Léon Guignance	Bordeaux	Kingdom of France	For French Navy.
29 April	Provence	Ship of the line		Toulon	Kingdom of France	For French Navy.
16 May	Albion	Albion-class ship of the line	Adam Heyes	Deptford Dockyard	Great Britain	For Royal Navy.
13 June	Jason	Richmond-class frigate	Robert Batson	Rotherhithe	Great Britain	For Royal Navy.
1 July	Zélé	César-class ship of the line	Joseph-Marie-Blaise Coulomb	Toulon	Kingdom of France	For French Navy.
26 July	Exeter	Exeter-class ship of the line	Henniker	Chatham Dockyard	Great Britain	For Royal Navy.
10 August	Terpsichore	Frigate	Indret	Nantes	Kingdom of France	For French Navy.
26 August	Hussar	Mermaid-class frigate	Thomas Inwood	Rotherhithe	Great Britain	For Royal Navy.
9 September	Solebay	Mermaid-class frigate	Thomas Airey & Co.	Newcastle upon Tyne	Great Britain	For Royal Navy.
8 October	Dawes	Jamaicaman	William Dodman and William Barnard	Ipswich	Great Britain	For private owner.
8 October	Ferret	Ferret-class cutter	Edward Allin	Chatham Dockyard	Great Britain	For Royal Navy.
8 October	Lurcher	Ferret-class cutter	Adam Hayes	Deptford Dockyard	Great Britain	For Royal Navy.
10 October	Ferme	Bordelois-class ship of the line	Léon Guignance	Bordeaux	Kingdom of France	For French Navy.
22 October	Danae	Fifth rate	Indret	Nantes	Kingdom of France	For French Navy.
24 October	Augusta	St Albans-class ship of the line	Wells & Stanton	Rotherhithe	Great Britain	For Royal Navy.
24 October	Glory	Fifth rate	Benjamin Blaydes	Hull	Great Britain	For Royal Navy.
November	Union	Third rate	Jean Geoffroy	Brest	Kingdom of France	For French Navy.
3 December	Sherborne	Cutter	Joseph Harris	Woolwich Dockyard	Great Britain	For Royal Navy.
5 December	Guadeloupe	Coventry-class frigate	John Williams	Neyland	Great Britain	For Royal Navy.
Unknown date	Atrevido	Fifth Rate	Juan Real	Palma de Mallorca	Spain	For Spanish Navy.
Unknown date	Bellona	Frigate		Rotterdam	Dutch Republic	For Dutch Navy.
Unknown date	Devonshire	East Indiaman	John Perry	Blackwall Yard	Great Britain	For British East India Company.
Unknown date	Dutton	East Indiaman	John Wells	Deptford	Great Britain	For British East India Company.
Unknown date	Duke of Gloucester	East Indiaman	Robert Batson	Limehouse	Great Britain	For British East India Company.
Unknown date	Earl of Lincoln	East Indiaman	John Wells	Deptford	Great Britain	For British East India Company.
Unknown date	Le Jean Baptiste	Merchantman		Saint-Malo	Kingdom of France	For private owner.
Unknown date	Vigilant	Corvette		Nantes	Kingdom of France	For French Navy.
Unknown date	Mars	Third rate	L van Zwijndrecht	Rotterdam	Dutch Republic	For Dutch Navy.
Unknown date	Sherbourne	Cutter			Great Britain	For the Revenue Service.
Unknown date	Swift	Schooner		Bombay	India	For Bombay Pilot Service.
