= List of ship launches in 1762 =

The list of ship launches in 1762 includes a chronological list of some ships launched in 1762.

Date	Ship	Class	Builder	Location	Country	Notes
26 January	Admiral Pocock	East Indiaman	John Wells	Deptford	Great Britain	For British East India Company.
January	Gracieuse	Coquette-class gunboat	Chevallier Antoine Groignard	Lorient	Kingdom of France	For French Navy.
23 March	Kent	Bellona-class ship of the line	Adam Hayes	Deptford Dockyard	Great Britain	For Royal Navy.
27 March	Pearl	Niger-class frigate	Edward Allin	Chatham Dockyard	Great Britain	For Royal Navy.
March	Albion	East Indiaman	Thomas West	Rotherhithe	Great Britain	For British East India Company.
8 May	Sviatoi Fyodor	Fifth rate	I. V. James	Arkhangelsk	Russia	For Imperial Russian Navy.
10 May	Lark	Richmond-class frigate	Elias Bird	Rotherhithe	Great Britain	For Royal Navy.
11 May	Boston	Richmond-class frigate	Robert Inwood	Rotherhithe	Great Britain	For Royal Navy.
24 May	Nautilus	Favourite-class sloop	Thomas Hodgson	Hull	Great Britain	For Royal Navy.
8 June	Emerald	Niger-class frigate	Benjamin Blaydes	Hull	Great Britain	For Royal Navy.
3 July	Singe	Renard-class xebec		Toulon	Kingdom of France	For French Navy.
8 July	Romney	Fourth rate	Joseph Harris	Woolwich Dockyard	Great Britain	For Royal Navy.
4 September	Terrible	Ramillies-class ship of the line	John Barnard	Harwich Dockyard	Great Britain	For Royal Navy.
19 October	Britannia	First rate	Thomas Bucknall	Portsmouth Dockyard	Great Britain	For Royal Navy.
November	Diligent	Third rate	Chevallier Antoine Groignard	Lorient	Kingdom of France	For French Navy.
29 December	Six Corps	Third rate	Chevallier Antoine Groignard	Lorient	Kingdom of France	For French Navy.
30 December	Bute	East Indiaman	John Perry	Blackwall	Great Britain	For British East India Company.
Unknown date	Clive	East Indiaman	John Perry	Blackwall Yard	Great Britain	For British East India Company.
Unknown date	Deptford	East Indiaman	John Wells	Deptford	Great Britain	For British East India Company.
Unknown date	Duke of Albany	East Indiaman	John Wells	Deptford	Great Britain	For British East India Company.
Unknown date	Elizabeth	East Indiaman	John Randall	Rotherhithe	Great Britain	For British East India Company.
Unknown date	Glatton	East Indiaman	John Wells	Deptford	Great Britain	For British East India Company.
Unknown date	Heart of Oak	Merchantman		South Carolina	Thirteen Colonies	For private owner.
Unknown date	Le Beaumont	Beaumont-class East Indiaman		Lorient	Kingdom of France	For Compagnie des Indes.
Unknown date	Caméléon	Renard-class xebec		Toulon	Kingdom of France	For French Navy.
Unknown date	Renard	Renard-class xebec		Toulon	Kingdom of France	For French Navy.
Unknown date	Séduisant	Renard-class xebec		Toulon	Kingdom of France	For French Navy.
Unknown date	Le Villevault	Beaumont-class East Indiaman		Lorient	Kingdom of France	For Compagnie des Indes.
Unknown date	Michigan	Sloop of war		Navy Island Royal Naval Shipyard	New France	For Royal Navy.
Unknown date	Plassey	Schooner		Bombay	India	For Bombay Pilot Service.
Unknown date	Salomon	Flûte		Nantes	Kingdom of France	For French Navy.
Unknown date	Name unknown				Kingdom of France	For private owner.
