= Ferme =

Ferme may refer to:

- French ship Ferme (1699), a 72-gun ship of the line of the French Navy
- French ship Ferme (1763), a 56-gun Bordelois-class ship of the line of the French Navy
- French ship Ferme (1785), a 74-gun Téméraire-class ship of the line of the French Navy

== People with the surname ==
- Tadej Ferme (born 1991), Slovenian basketball player

== See also ==
- Saint-Ferme, a commune in Nouvelle-Aquitaine, France
- Ferm
