= French ship Ferme =

At least two ships of the French Navy have been named Ferme:

- French ship Ferme (1763) a Bordelois-class ship of the line launched in 1763 and sold to the Ottomans in 1774
- French ship Ferme (1785) a Téméraire-class ship of the line launched in 1785, renamed Phocion in 1792 and acquired by Spain in 1793
