= French ship Bordelois =

Ship of the line of the French Navy

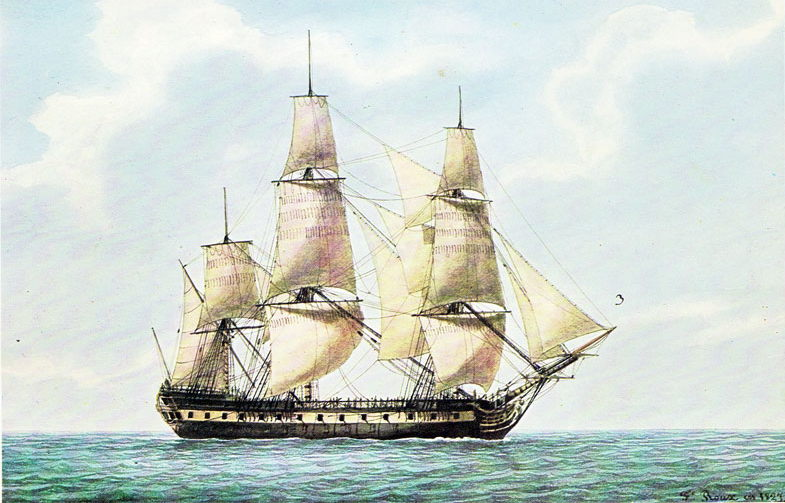
- Watercolour portrait of sister-ship Flamand, by François Roux, commissioned by Willaumez

History

France
- Name: Bordelois (Note: "Bordelois" is an ancient graphy of "Bordelais")
- Namesake: City of Bordeaux
- Builder: Bordeaux
- Laid down: January 1762
- Launched: 26 April 1763
- In service: July 1763
- Out of service: 19 June 1779
- Renamed: États d'Artois in 1779
- Captured: by HMS Romney on 1 July 1780
- Notes: Participated in: Battle of Dogger Bank

Great Britain
- Name: HMS Artois
- Acquired: captured by HMS Romney on 1 July 1780
- Fate: Sold February 1786

General characteristics
- Displacement: 2005 tonneaux
- Tons burthen: 1100 port tonneaux
- Length: 50.7 m (166 ft 4 in)
- Beam: 13.8 m (45 ft 3 in)
- Draught: 6.3 m (20 ft 8 in)
- Propulsion: Sail, full-rigged ship
- Armament: 56 guns: 24 36-pounder long guns; 26 18-pounder long guns; 6 8-pounder long guns

Bordelois was a 56-gun ship of the line of the French Navy, lead ship of her class. She was funded by a don des vaisseaux donation from the city of Bordeaux, and built by engineer Léon Guignace on a design by Antoine Groignard. Complete too late to serve in the Seven Years' War, she was razéed into a frigate and used as an East Indiaman. She was rebuilt into a frigate to serve in the War of American Independence. Captured by HMS Romney, she was brought into British service as HMS Artois.

== Career ==
Bordelois was commissioned in July 1763 under Captain Charles de Cornick-Duchène, arriving in Rochefort on 6 September after the end of the Seven Years' War. In 1768, she was razéed to a large frigate, while her spare timber was used to rebuild Ferme.

From 1776 to 1778, Bordelois was used as an East Indiaman, after which she became a hulk in Lorient.

In 1779, on the background of the Franco-American alliance, Bordelois was sold and razéed into a 40-gun frigate; her refitting having been financed by the States of Artois, she was renamed to États d'Artois . She entered drydock in June 1779, to be launched in January 1780 and commissioned in May 1780.

On 1 July 1780 Artois was captured by HMS Romney, and brought into British service as HMS Artois.

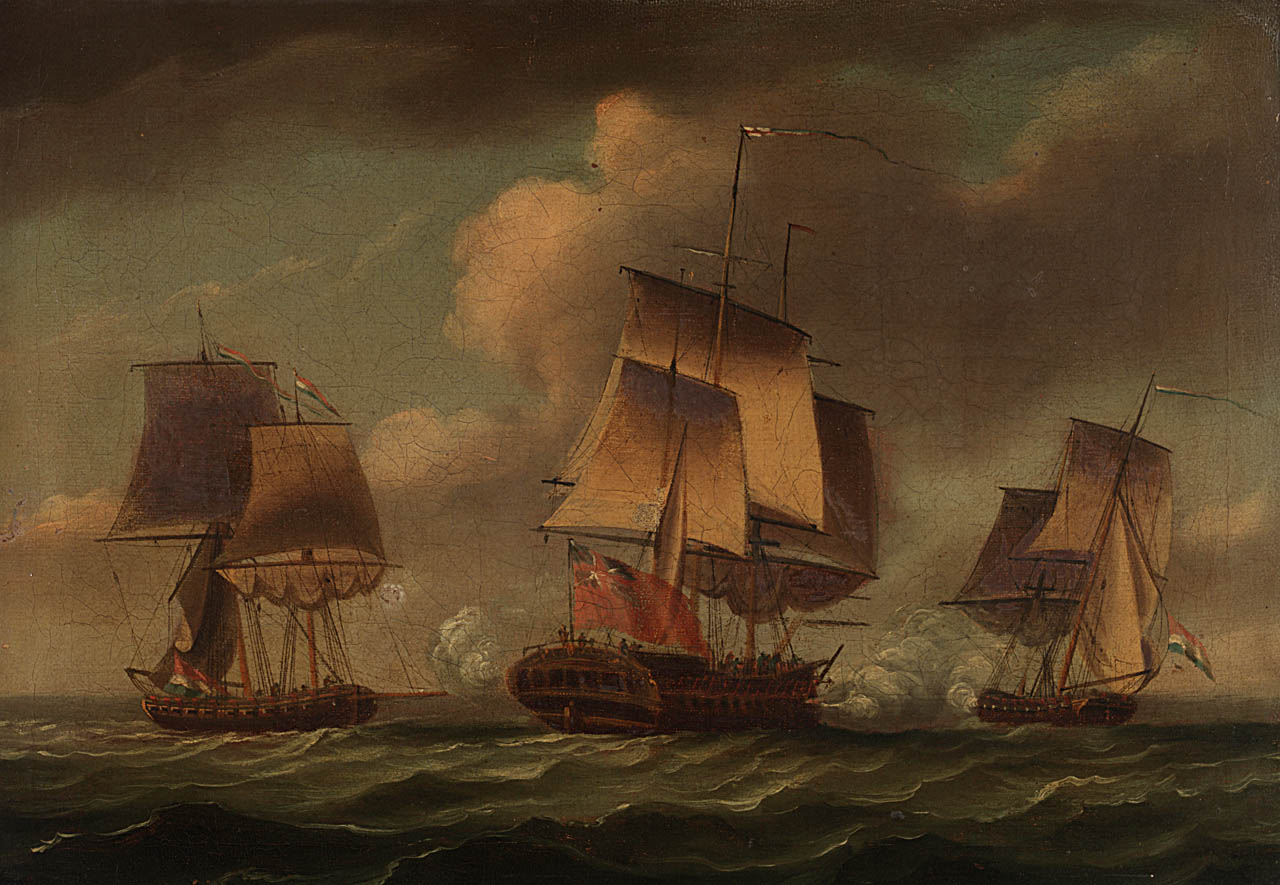
Captain MacBride in Artois taking two Dutch privateers, Hercules and Mars, in 1781

She participated in the Battle of Dogger Bank. "Artois was the finest frigate then known; had 28 18-pounders on her main deck with in addition to her complement of guns, heavy carronades on the quarterdeck and forecastle; Manned by 300 men".
