= French ship Utile (1764) =

Ship of the line of the French Navy

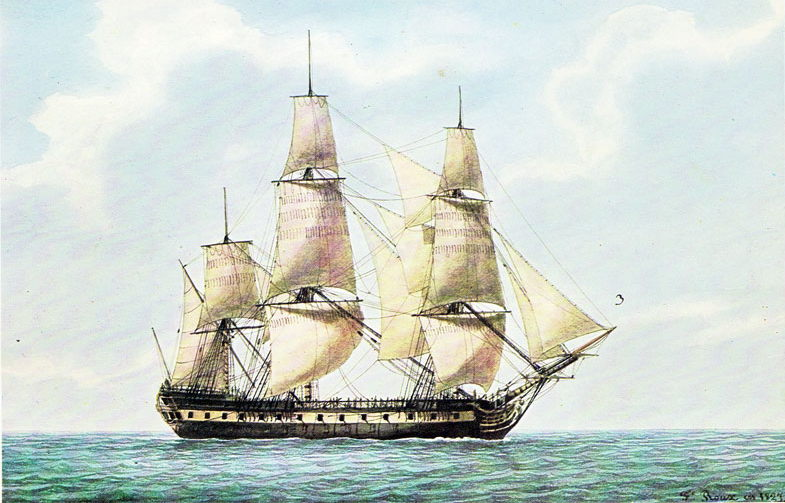
- Watercolour portrait of sister-ship Flamand, by François Roux, commissioned by Willaumez

History

France
- Name: Utile
- Namesake: "Useful"
- Builder: Bordeaux
- Laid down: May 1763
- Launched: 11 August 1764
- In service: 18 October 1764
- Out of service: 1771
- Fate: Broken up 1793

General characteristics
- Displacement: 2005 tonneaux
- Tons burthen: 1100 port tonneaux
- Length: 50.7 m (166 ft 4 in)
- Beam: 13.8 m (45 ft 3 in)
- Draught: 6.3 m (20 ft 8 in)
- Propulsion: Sail, full-rigged ship
- Complement: 560 men
- Armament: 56 guns: 24 × 36-pounder long guns; 26 × 18-pounder long guns; 6 × 8-pounder long guns

Utile was a 56-gun Bordelois-class ship of the line of the French Navy. She was funded by a don des vaisseaux donation from the States of Flander, and built by engineer Léon Guignace on a design by Antoine Groignard. Completed too late to serve in the Seven Years' War, she served in the Mediterranean before becoming a junk in Rochefort.

== Career ==
From April to October 1765, Utile campaigned under Captain Duchaffault against privateers off Morocco. She took part in the 1765 Bombardment of Salé and in the Bombardment of Larache.

From 1772, she was reduced to a hulk in Rochfort and used as a masting machine. She was eventually broken up around 1793.
