= Bordelois-class ship of the line =

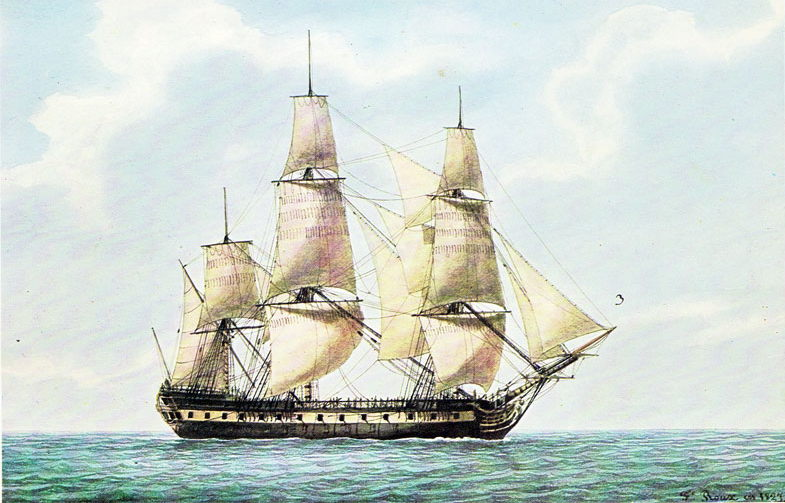
- Watercolour portrait of Flamand, by François Roux, commissioned by Willaumez

Class overview
- Name: Bordelois
- Builders: Bordeaux
- Operators: French Navy; Royal Navy; Ottoman Navy
- Planned: 4
- Completed: 4

General characteristics
- Displacement: 2005 tonneaux
- Tons burthen: 1100 port tonneaux
- Length: 50.7 metres
- Beam: 13.75 metres
- Draught: 6.3 metres
- Propulsion: Sail, full-rigged ship
- Complement: 560 men in war, 500 in peace
- Armament: 56 guns: Main deck: 24 × 36-pounder long guns; Upper deck: 26 × 18-pounder long guns; Forecastle and sterncastle: 6 × 8-pounder long guns
- Armour: Timber

The Bordelois class was a class of 56-gun ships of the line, designed by Antoine Groignard. This was a unique type, designed to provide a battlefleet armament (with 36-pounder guns in the principal battery) on a hull able to operate in the shallow waters around Dunkirk. The ships were funded by don des vaisseaux donations and rushed into production for the Seven Years' War, but were completed too late to take part in the conflict. The Flamand would later have a distinguished career during the War of American Independence.

== Ships in class ==
- Bordelois

Builder: Bordeaux shipyard
Ordered: 3 November 1761
Laid down: August 1762
Laid down: July 1762
Launched: 26 April 1763
Completed: July 1763
Fate: Cut down into a frigate in 1779 and renamed Artois; captured by the Royal Navy on 1 July 1780, recommissioned as HMS Artois, then sold February 1786 to break up.

- Ferme

Builder: Bordeaux shipyard
Ordered: 3 November 1761
Laid down: August 1762
Launched: 10 October 1763
Completed: December 1763
Fate: Sold to the Ottoman Navy in August 1774

- Utile

Builder: Bordeaux shipyard
Ordered: 3 November 1761
Laid down: August 1762
Laid down: May 1763
Launched: 14 August 1764
Completed: December 1764
Fate: Condemned in December 1771 at Rochefort and hulked there by 1773.

- Flamand

Builder: Bordeaux shipyard
Ordered: 3 November 1761
Laid down: August 1762
Laid down: October 1763
Launched: 11 May 1765
Completed: July 1765
Fate: Condemned 1785-86 at Rochefort and struck.
