= French ship Union =

French ship Union may refer to the following ships of the French Navy:

- French ship Union (1763), a 64-gun ship of the line
- French ship Union (1799), a 74-gun Téméraire-class ship of the line
