= List of shipwrecks in 1765 =

The list of shipwrecks in 1765 includes some ships sunk, wrecked or otherwise lost during 1765.

table of contents
1765
Jan	Feb	Mar	Apr
May	Jun	Jul	Aug
Sep	Oct	Nov	Dec
Unknown date

== January ==
=== 10 January ===
List of shipwrecks: 10 January 1765
Ship	State	Description
La Purísima Concepción	Spanish Navy	The frigate was wrecked north of Cape Horn, Viceroyalty of Peru. Most of her 139 crew survived. She was on a voyage from Cádiz to Lima, Viceroyalty of Peru.
William & Mary	Great Britain	The ship was lost in Mount's Bay with some loss of life. She was on a voyage from Antigua to London.

=== 15 January ===
List of shipwrecks: 15 January 1765
Ship	State	Description
Albion	British East India Company	The East Indiaman foundered in the North Sea off the Longsand Head. Her crew were rescued. She was on a voyage from London to Madras, India and China.

=== 21 January ===
List of shipwrecks: 21 January 1765
Ship	State	Description
Adventure	Great Britain	The ship was run down in The Downs by a catt. All on board were rescued. She was beached at Kingsdown, Kent but was a total loss.
Princess Carolind	Great Britain	The ship was wrecked on the Black Middings, in the North Sea off Newcastle upon Tyne, Northumberland.

=== 23 January ===
List of shipwrecks: 23 January 1765
Ship	State	Description
Isabella	Great Britain	The ship was lost on the Newark Rocks, Sanday, Orkney Islands. She was on a voyage from Bergen, Norway to Wick, Caithness.

=== 26 January ===
List of shipwrecks: 26 January 1765
Ship	State	Description
Plymouth Packet	Great Britain	The ship was destroyed by fire at Dublin, Ireland.

=== 31 January ===
List of shipwrecks: 31 January 1765
Ship	State	Description
Partridge	Great Britain	The ship was lost on the Trinity Sand, in the Humber. She was on a voyage from King's Lynn, Norfolk to Hull, Yorkshire.
Thomas and Rebecca	Great Britain	The ship was lost on the Trinity Sand. She was on a voyage from King's Lynn to Hull.

=== Unknown date ===
List of shipwrecks: Unknown date 1765
Ship	State	Description
Augusta	Great Britain	The ship was run down and sunk at Dublin, Ireland.
Barbara	Great Britain	The ship was driven ashore at Corton, Suffolk. Her crew were rescued. She was on a voyage from a Scottish port to Livorno, Grand Duchy of Tuscany.
Bilboa Merchant	Great Britain	The ship was lost at Bilbao, Spain. She was on a voyage from Newfoundland, British America to Bilbao.
Britannia	Great Britain	The ship was driven ashore in Ballycotton Bay and was plundered by the local inhabitants. She was on a voyage from Dublin to Liverpool, Lancashire.
Elizabeth	Great Britain	The ship was driven ashore on Gun Island. She was on a voyage from Exeter, Devon to Dublin, Ireland.
Juana Maria	Spain	The ship was run down and sunk in the River Thames at Gravesend, Kent. Great Britain by Hector ( British East India Company).
Jufro Agneta	Dutch Republic	The ship was lost in Dundrum Bay. She was on a voyage from Rotterdam to an Irish port.
Mary Elizabeth	Dutch Republic	The ship was driven ashore 2 nautical miles (3.7 km) from Rye Harbour, Sussex, Great Britain. She was on a voyage from Havre de Grâce, France to Rotterdam.
Little London	Great Britain	The ship was driven ashore 3 leagues west of Boulogne, France. She was on a voyage from "Lamatte" to Ostend, Dutch Republic.
Othello	Great Britain	The ship was lost near Londonderry, Ireland. She was on a voyage from Jamaica to Glasgow, Renfrewshire.
Peter	Ireland	The ship was driven ashore and wrecked near Boulogne. She was on a voyage from Waterford to Hamburg.
Plymouth Packet	Great Britain	The ship was lost on the Welsh coast with the lossof all hands. She was on a voyage from Liverpool to Plymouth, Devon.
Prince Henry	Great Britain	The ship foundered in the Atlantic Ocean 40 leagues (120 nautical miles (220 km) west of Cape Clear Island, County Cork, Ireland. Her crew were rescued by York (Great Britain). She was on a voyage from Jamaica to Liverpool.
Rebecca	Great Britain	The ship was lost at Bordeaux, France. She was on a voyage from New England, British America to Bordeaux.
Recovery	Great Britain	The ship was driven ashore near Wexford, Ireland with the loss of three or four of her crew. She was on a voyage from London to Dublin, Ireland.
Sally	Ireland	The ship was driven ashore 30 nautical miles (56 km) west of Cork. She was on a voyage from Lisbon, Portugal to Cork.
St. Johannes	Sweden	The ship was driven ashore and wrecked on the Isle of Man. Her crew were rescued. She was on a voyage from Stockholm to Colerain, County Antrim, Ireland.
Samuel	Great Britain	The ship foundered in the Irish Sea off the Isle of Man. She was on a voyage from the "Annon River" to Lancaster, Lancashire.
True Love	Great Britain	The ship was lost in German's Bay, Cornwall with the loss of all hands. She was on a voyage from London to Dublin.
Vulture	Great Britain	The ship was driven ashore near "La Novilla". She was on a voyage from Barcelona, Spain to Cette, France.

== February ==
=== 8 February ===
List of shipwrecks: 8 February 1765
Ship	State	Description
Friendly Brothers	Great Britain	The ship foundered in the Atlantic Ocean. Her crew were rescued by Trident (France). She was on a voyage from Grenada to London.

=== 9 February ===
List of shipwrecks: 9 February 1765
Ship	State	Description
Providence	Great Britain	The ship was driven ashore and wrecked at Plymouth, Devon.

=== 14 February ===
List of shipwrecks: 14 February 1765
Ship	State	Description
Britannia	Great Britain	The ship sank at Margate, Kent. She was on a voyage from London to Dunkirk, France.

=== 19 February ===
List of shipwrecks: 19 February 1765
Ship	State	Description
Don Carlo	Great Britain	The ship sprang a leak in the Atlantic Ocean. All 23 people on board abandoned her two days later and were rescued on 23 February by the snow Jane (Great Britain). Don Carlo was on a voyage from Havana, Captaincy General of Cuba to Norfolk, Virginia, British America.

=== 24 February ===
List of shipwrecks: 24 February 1765
Ship	State	Description
Halifax	Great Britain	The ship was lost at a port in Senegal with the loss of two of her crew. She was on a voyage from London to Senegal.

=== 26 February ===
List of shipwrecks: 26 February 1765
Ship	State	Description
Neptune	flag unknown	The ship was wrecked on the Dutch coast. She was on a voyage from Bordeaux, France to Rotterdam, Dutch Republic.

=== 27 February ===
List of shipwrecks: 27 February 1765
Ship	State	Description
Grenville Packet	Great Britain	The ship was lost on the Dry Tortugas. Her crew were rescued. She was on a voyage from Falmouth, Cornwall to Pensacola, Florida, British America.

=== Unknown date ===
List of shipwrecks: Unknown date 1765
Ship	State	Description
Endeavour	Great Britain	The sloop was lost on the coast of Senegal whilst engaged in salvaging the cargo of Halifax (Great Britain).
George	Ireland	The ship was wrecked at Plymouth, Devon, Great Britain. She was on a voyage from Plymouth to Falmouth, Cornwall, Great Britain.
Dunbar	Ireland	The ship sank in the River Liffey at Poolbegg. She was on a voyage from Dublin to Barbados.
Juno	Great Britain	The ship was lost near Dunbar, Lothian. She was on a voyage from Newcastle upon Tyne, Northumberland to Ipswich, Suffolk.
Neptune	Dutch Republic	The ship was driven ashore at Penzance, Cornwall. Her crew were rescued. She was on a voyage from Málaga, Spain to Amsterdam.
Norwich Anventure	Great Britain	The ship foundered in the English Channel off Calais, France. She was on a voyage from Rotterdam, Dutch Republic to Portsmouth, Hampshire.
Polly	Great Britain	The ship foundered in the Mediterranean Sea off Málaga.
Providence	Great Britain	The ship ran aground in the Elbe. She was on a voyage from Newcastle upon Tyne to Hamburg.
Reine dos Anges	France	The ship was lost on the Portuguese coast. She was on a voyage from Havre de Grâce to Cádiz, Spain.
Sally	Great Britain	The ship was driven ashore at Hastings, Sussex. She was on a voyage from London to Cork, Ireland and the West Indies.
St. Michael	Great Britain	The ship was driven ashore on the west coast of Scotland. She was on a voyage from Saint Kitts to Galway, Ireland and Bristol, Gloucestershire.
Union	Great Britain	The ship ran aground and was wrecked near Cuxhaven. She was on a voyage from Cowes, Isle of Wight to Hamburg.

== March ==
=== 6 March ===
List of shipwrecks: 6 March 1765
Ship	State	Description
Nancy	Great Britain	The ship foundered in The Swin. She was on a voyage from Blyth, Northumberland to London.

=== 8 March ===
List of shipwrecks: 8 March 1765
Ship	State	Description
Fanny	Great Britain	The ship ran aground on Pigeon's Island, in the Milk River, Jamaica. and was wrecked. Her crew were rescued.

=== 27 March ===
List of shipwrecks: 27 March 1765
Ship	State	Description
St. Nicholas	France	The brig was driven ashore west of Rye, Sussex, Great Britain. Her crew were rescued.

=== Unknown date ===
List of shipwrecks: Unknown date 1765
Ship	State	Description
Experiment	Great Britain	The ship ran aground and was wrecked at Pool, Dorset. She was on a voyage from London to Jersey, Channel Islands.
Jane & Mary	Great Britain	The ship foundered in the North Sea off Blyth, Northumberland. Her crew were rescued. She was on a voyage from Berwick upon Tweed to Newcastle upon Tyne.
John	Great Britain	The ship was driven ashore near Walmer Castle, Kent.
Sally	Ireland	The ship was wrecked on Mallorca. She was on a voyage from Livorno, Grand Duchy of Tuscany to Dublin.

== April ==
=== 6 April ===
List of shipwrecks: 6 April 1765
Ship	State	Description
Betsey	Great Britain	The ship was driven ashore at West Tarbert, Argyllshire.

=== 9 April ===
List of shipwrecks: 9 April 1765
Ship	State	Description
Expedition	Great Britain	The ship was driven ashore at Fife Ness, Fife. Her crew were rescued. She was on a voyage from Rotterdam, Dutch Republic to Ely, Fife.

=== 25 April ===
List of shipwrecks: 25 April 1765
Ship	State	Description
Medway Planter	Great Britain	The ship was wrecked on a reef off Cat Island, Bahamas. Her crew survived. She was on a voyage from Jamaica to London.

=== Unknown date ===
List of shipwrecks: Unknown date 1765
Ship	State	Description
Bien Aime	France	The ship was driven ashore at La Rochelle. She was on a voyage from Nantes to Lisbon, Portugal.
Charlestown	(Kingdom of Great Britain) British America	The snow was driven ashore in the Isles of Scilly, Great Britain. She was on a voyage from South Carolina to London, Great Britain.
Indian Queen	Great Britain	The ship was driven ashore on the east coast of Texell, Dutch Republic. She was on a voyage from Pool, Dorset to Amsterdam, Dutch Republic.
Jane and Mary	Great Britain	The ship was lost in the Baltic Sea.
John and Elizabeth	Great Britain	The ship ran aground in the North Sea off Great Yarmouth, Norfolk. Her crew were rescued by Good Intent (Great Britain). John and Elizabeth was on a voyage from Newcastle upon Tyne, Northumberland to London.
John and Sarah	Great Britain	The ship was lost in the Baltic Sea.
Katherine	Great Britain	The ship was driven ashore near Boulogne, France. She was on a voyage from Lisbon to London.
Love and Unity	Great Britain	The ship was lost in the Baltic Sea.
Mary	Ireland	The ship was driven ashore near Dundalk, County Louth. She was on a voyage from Alicante, Spain to Newry, County Antrim.
Pensilvania Packet	Great Britain	The ship was driven ashore in the Elbe. She was on a voyage from Hamburg to London.
Principi d'España	Great Britain	The ship was driven ashore and wrecked west of Falmouth, Cornwall, Great Britain. Her crew were rescued. She was on a voyage from Exeter, Devon, Great Britain to Alicante
Swan	Great Britain	The ship was lost in the Elbe. She was on a voyage from Newcastle upon Tyne, Northumberland to Hamburg.
Thomas and Ruth	Great Britain	The ship struck the Harker-bar Rock, in the North Sea off the coast of Northumberland and foundered with the loss of all but one of her crew. She was on a voyage from Hamburg to Newcastle upon Tyne.

== May ==
=== 11 May ===
List of shipwrecks: 11 May 1765
Ship	State	Description
John & Dorothy	Great Britain	The ship struck a rock and foundered in the Baltic Sea off Hogland, Russia. Her crew were rescued by Romish King (Dutch Republic). John & Dorothy was on a voyage from London to Saint Petersburg, Russia.

=== 15 May ===
List of shipwrecks: 15 May 1765
Ship	State	Description
Success	(Kingdom of Great Britain) British America	The sloop was wrecked on a reef off the "Grand Caucases". Her crew survived.
Zeldenrost	Dutch Republic	The ship was wrecked on the Goodwin Sands, Kent, Great Britain. Her crew were rescued.

== June ==
=== Unknown date ===
List of shipwrecks: Unknown date 1765
Ship	State	Description
Active	Great Britain	The ship foundered in the North Sea off Great Yarmouth, Norfolk.
Susannah and Sarah	Great Britain	The ship foundered in the Kattegat. She was on a voyage from London to Riga, Russia.
Betsey	Great Britain	The ship foundered in the Atlantic Ocean 100 leagues (300 nautical miles (560 km) west of Cape Clear Island, County Cork, Ireland. Her crew were rescued. She was on a voyage from Maryland, British America to Bristol, Gloucestershire.
Revenge	Great Britain	The ship was wrecked 2 nautical miles (3.7 km) north of the Currituck Inlet, Virginia, British America. She was on a voyage from Curasoa to Norfolk, Virginia.
Union	Great Britain	The ship foundered between the Zinder and the Northern Channel. She was on a voyage from Cowes, Isle of Wight to Hamburg.

== July ==
=== 31 July ===
List of shipwrecks: 31 July 1765
Ship	State	Description
Friendship	(Kingdom of Great Britain) Guernsey	The ship was wrecked in a hurricane at Guadeloupe.

== August ==
=== 6 August ===
List of shipwrecks: 6 August 1765
Ship	State	Description
Loyal Pitt	Great Britain	The transport ship was lost in the Saint Lawrence River. She was on a voyage from London to Quebec.

=== 14 August ===
List of shipwrecks: 14 August 1765
Ship	State	Description
Charming Nelly	Great Britain	The ship ran aground off Ouessant, France and was wrecked. She was on a voyage from Málaga, Spain to Hull, Yorkshire.

=== 31 August ===
List of shipwrecks: 31 August 1765
Ship	State	Description
General Burton	Great Britain	The ship was driven ashore and wrecked in Plymouth Sound, Devon. She was on a voyage from Jamaica to Hull, Yorkshire.

=== Unknown date ===
List of shipwrecks: Unknown date 1765
Ship	State	Description
Jane	Great Britain	The ship was wrecked at Cape Onega, Russia. She was on a voyage from London to Onega, Russia.
Mary	Great Britain	The ship was driven ashore on the Dutch coast. She was on a voyage from Saint Petersburg, Russia to Bristol, Gloucestershire.
Nostra Señora da Luz	Spain	The ship was destroyed by fire at Cádiz.
Richmond	Great Britain	The ship ran aground on the Dragoe Reef. She was on a voyage from Riga, Russia to London.

== September ==
=== 10 September ===
List of shipwrecks: 10 September 1765
Ship	State	Description
Unidentified	Dutch Republic	The snow was wrecked on the Goodwin Sands, Kent, Great Britain.

=== 15 September ===
List of shipwrecks: 15 September 1765
Ship	State	Description
Francis	Great Britain	The ship was driven ashore near Memel, Prussia and wrecked. She was on a voyage from Portsmouth, Hampshire to Memel.

=== 17 September ===
List of shipwrecks: 17 September 1765
Ship	State	Description
Anna Jacobee	Dutch Republic	The ship was wrecked on the Goodwin Sands, Kent, Great Britain.

=== 30 September ===
List of shipwrecks: 30 September 1765
Ship	State	Description
St. Peter	Ireland	The ship was driven ashore and wrecked in Ardinary Bay, County Wicklow. She was on a voyage from Dublin to Madeira and Tenerife, Canary Islands.

=== Unknown date ===
List of shipwrecks: Unknown date 1765
Ship	State	Description
Aurora	Great Britain	The ship was lost at Whitehaven, Cumberland.

== October ==
=== 5 October ===
List of shipwrecks: 5 October 1765
Ship	State	Description
Dame Johatina	Dutch Republic	The ship was driven ashore and wrecked 4 nautical miles (7.4 km) west of Boulogne, France. She was on a voyage from Amsterdam to Smyrna, Ottoman Empire.

=== Unknown date ===
List of shipwrecks: Unknown date 1765
Ship	State	Description
Cathcart	Great Britain	The ship was driven ashore near Fairleigh, Ayrshire. She was on a voyage from Maryland, British America to Glasgow, Renfrewshire.
James and Eleanor	Great Britain	The ship was lost near St. Mary's, Newfoundland, British America. She was on a voyage from Boston, Massachusetts, to St. Mary's.
Juliana	Great Britain	The ship was driven ashore in the River Thames at Pitcher's Point. She was on a voyage from Saint Petersburg, Russia to London.
Melville	Great Britain	The ship was lost near Rye, Sussex. She was on a voyage from Granades to London.
Neptune	Ireland	The ship was driven ashore and wrecked at Dounlare, County Dublin. She was on a voyage from Saint Petersburg to Dublin.
Providence	France	The ship was driven ashore near Ostend, Dutch Republic. She was on a voyage from Nantes to Dunkirk.
Speedwell	Great Britain	The ship was lost on the Burbo Bank, in Liverpool Bay. She was on a voyage from Carmarthen to Liverpool, Lancashire.
Speedwell's Increas	Great Britain	The ship was lost in the Baltic Sea. She was on a voyage from Hull, Yorkshire to "Wyburg".
St. Johannes	Dutch Republic	The ship was driven ashore and wrecked on the Dutch coast. She was on a voyage from Glasgow to Rotterdam.

== November ==
=== 2 November ===
List of shipwrecks: 2 November 1765
Ship	State	Description
No. 1	Imperial Russian Navy	The ship was driven ashore and wrecked at Kildin Island.

=== 4 November ===
List of shipwrecks: 4 November 1765
Ship	State	Description
Peggy	Great Britain	The ship was wrecked at Eyemouth, Berwickshire with the loss of a crew member. She was on a voyage from Leith, Lothian to Livorno, Grand Duchy of Tuscany.

=== 5 November ===
List of shipwrecks: 5 November 1765
Ship	State	Description
Kleine Hendrick	Hamburg	The sloop was abandoned off Exeter, Devon, Great Britain but all hands were lost when their boat capsized. She was on a voyage from Cork, Ireland to Hamburg

=== 7 November ===
List of shipwrecks: 7 November 1765
Ship	State	Description
John and Margaret	Great Britain	The ship sank at Burlington, Yorkshire. Her crew were rescued.

=== Unknown date ===
List of shipwrecks: Unknown date 1765
Ship	State	Description
Adventure	Great Britain	The ship was lost at Dunkirk. France.
Elizabeth	Sweden	The ship foundered in the North Sea off Great Yarmouth, Norfolk, Great Britain. She was on a voyage from Gothenburg to Dublin, Ireland.
Elizabeth and Mary	Great Britain	The ship was driven ashore at Figuera da Foz, Portugal. She was on a voyage from Newfoundland, British America to Figuera da Foz.
Friendship	Great Britain	The ship was lost on the Scottish coast.
Friendship	Great Britain	The ship was driven ashore and wrecked at Highlake, Cheshire.
Freedom	Great Britain	The ship was driven ashore at Highlake.
Hannibal	Great Britain	The ship was lost in Carnarvon Bay with the loss of five of her crew. She was on a voyage from Boston to Liverpool, Lancashire.
Hawke	Great Britain	The ship was wrecked at Maltrayth, Anglesey with the loss of all hands. She was on a voyage from Dartmouth, Devon to Liverpool.
Kitty and Maria	Great Britain	The ship was driven ashore and wrecked near Boulogne, France. She was on a voyage from Maryland, British America to London.
Longbrooke	Great Britain	The ship was lost at Aveiro, Portugal.
Morgan	Great Britain	The ship was lost on the coast of Portugal She was on a voyage from Bristol, Gloucestershire to Cádiz, Spain.
Nancy	Great Britain	The ship foundered in the Atlantic Ocean off Figuera da Foz.
Neptune	Great Britain	The ship was lost on the Cockle Sand, in the North Sea off Great Yarmouth. She was on a voyage from Newcastle upon Tyne, Northumberland to London.
Rodney	Great Britain	The ship was lost on the Hindert Sand, in the North Sea off Helvoit, Dutch Republic. She was on a voyage from South Carolina, British America to Rotterdam, Dutch Republic.

== December ==
=== 9 December ===
List of shipwrecks: 9 December 1765
Ship	State	Description
Amity's Infatuation	Great Britain	The ship was wrecked on Scroby Sands, in the North Sea off the coast of Norfolk. She was on a voyage from Newcastle upon Tyne, Northumberland to London.
Endeavour	Great Britain	The ship was wrecked on Scroby Sands. She was on a voyage from Newcastle upon Tyne to Great Yarmouth, Norfolk.
Friendship	Great Britain	The brig was lost near Great Yarmouth.

=== 11 December ===
List of shipwrecks: 11 December 1765
Ship	State	Description
Little Robin	Great Britain	The schooner was run down by another vessel. Her crew were rescued. She was on a voyage from Newfoundland, British America to Teignmouth, Devon. Little Robin was later found 3 leagues (9 nautical miles (17 km) off the Île de Batz, France and was taken in to Morlaix.

=== 12 December ===
List of shipwrecks: 12 December 1765
Ship	State	Description
Rose	Great Britain	The ship was wrecked on the French coast with some loss of life. She was on a voyage from Livorno, Grand Duchy of Tuscany to London.

=== 14 December ===
List of shipwrecks: 14 December 1765
Ship	State	Description
Martha	Great Britain	The ship foundered in the Adriatic Sea 12 leagues (36 nautical miles (67 km) off Galipoly, Kingdom of Sicily.

=== 17 December ===
List of shipwrecks: 17 December 1765
Ship	State	Description
Industry	Great Britain	The ship was lost on the Haisborough Sands, in the North Sea off the coast of Norfolk with the loss of ten lives. Three crew were rescued. She was on a voyage from Sunderland, County Durham to London.

=== 31 December ===
List of shipwrecks: 31 December 1765
Ship	State	Description
Neptune	Great Britain	The ship foundered in the Atlantic Ocean. Her crew were rescued by the brig Chance (Great Britain). She was on a voyage from Nantucket, Massachusetts, British America to London.

=== Unknown date ===
List of shipwrecks: Unknown date 1765
Ship	State	Description
Betsey	Great Britain	The ship was driven ashore and wrecked on the coast of Fife. She was on a voyage from Leith, Lothian to Newcastle upon Tyne, Northumberland.
De Juffer	flag unknown	The ship foundered. She was on a voyage from Gijón, Spain to London, Great Britain.
Empress of Russia	Dutch Republic	The ship was lost on the coast of Lapland. She was on a voyage from Onega, Russia to Amsterdam.
Happy Return	Great Britain	The ship was lost in the English Channel off Guernsey, Channel Islands with the loss of all hands. She was on a voyage from Alicante, Spain to London.
Jane & Mary	Ireland	The ship was driven ashore and wrecked at Rota, Cádiz, Spain.
Newcastle	Great Britain	The ship was driven ashore at Filey, Yorkshire.
Nightingale	Great Britain	The ship foundered in the North Sea off Great Yarmouth, Norfolk.
Pitt	Great Britain	The ship was driven ashore on Heligoland. She was on a voyage from Great Yarmouth to Hamburg.
Ruby	Great Britain	The ship foundered in the North Sea off Great Yarmouth.
San Miguel	Spain	The ship was driven ashore and wrecked on the south coast of the Isle of Wight, Great Britain. She was on a voyage from Bilbao to London.
Success	Great Britain	The ship capsized at Liverpool, Lancashire and was severely damaged.
Swift	Great Britain	The ship foundered off Porto, Portugal. She was on a voyage from London to Porto.
Three Sisters	Ireland	The ship was wrecked whilst on a voyage from Dublin to Danzig and Memel, Prussia.

== Unknown date ==
List of shipwrecks: Unknown date 1765
Ship	State	Description
Britain	Great Britain	The ship was lost near Bennin, Edo.
Charming Betsey	Great Britain	The ship foundered in the Atlantic Ocean off Martha's Vineyard, Massachusetts, British America.
City of Rotterdam	Dutch Republic	The ship was lost off Arkhangelsk, Russia. She was on a voyage from Arkhangelsk to Amsterdam.
Cumberland	Great Britain	The ship was lost on the coast of "Banaco".
Dolphin	Great Britain	The ship was lost in the Windward Passage. Her crew were rescued. She was on a voyage from Jamaica to Liverpool, Lancashire.
Duke	Great Britain	The snow was lost in the Bahamas. She was on a voyage from South Carolina, British America to Porto, Portugal.
Fairfax	Great Britain	The ship was lost at Bermuda. She was on a voyage from Virginia, British America to Bristol, Gloucestershire.
Fortune	Great Britain	The ship foundered in the Atlantic Ocean. She was on a voyage from Grenada to the Piscataqua River, British America.
Friendship	Great Britain	The ship foundered in the Atlantic Ocean. She was on a voyage from Bristol to the Piscataqua River, British America.
Friendship	Great Britain	The ship was lost on the coast of the Spanish Main. She was on a voyage from Jamaica to the Spanish Main.
Friendship	Great Britain	The ship was driven ashore and wrecked in the West Indies.
Golden Grove	Ireland	The ship was driven ashore and wrecked on Block Island, Rhode Island, British America. She was on a voyage from Cork to Halifax, Nova Scotia, British America.
Golden Lyon	Great Britain	The whaler was sunk by ice off the coast of Greenland. Her crew were rescued by Annabella (Great Britain).
Goldfinch	Great Britain	The ship was lost near Bennin.
Hare	Great Britain	The ship was lost on the Colorados. Her crew were rescued by Britannia (Great Britain). Hare was on a voyage from Jamaica to Liverpool.
Harlequin	(Kingdom of Great Britain) British America	The sloop was abandoned in the Atlantic Ocean before 25 March. Her crew were rescued. She was on a voyage from Suriname to Newport, Rhode Island.
Joseph	Ireland	The ship was lost at Barbados. She was on a voyage from Barbados to Dublin.
Monkton	Great Britain	The ship was driven ashore at Philadelphia, Pennsylvania, British America. She was on a voyage from Jamaica to Philadelphia.
Old Providence	Great Britain	The whaler was lost in ice of the coast of Greenland.
Polly	Great Britain	The ship foundered a few leagues from the "Isle of Candre". She was on a voyage from Quebec to London.
Rebecca	Great Britain	The ship was lost in the "Old Streights". She was on a voyage from New York to Pensacola, Florida, British America.
Richard & Thomas	Great Britain	The ship was driven ashore and wrecked on the west coast of Cuba. Her crew were rescued.
