= Pierre-Claude Haudeneau de Breugnon =

- Born: 3 August 1717; Brest, France
- Died: 6 September 1792 (aged 75); Paris, France
- Relatives: Charles-Joseph Haudeneau de Breugnon
- Military career
- Branch: French Navy
- Rank: Vice-amiral
- Conflicts: Larache expedition Battle of Rhode Island; Battle of Grenada; Siege of Savannah

Pierre-Claude Haudeneau de Breugnon (Brest, 3 August 1717 — Paris, 6 September 1792) was a French Navy officer.

== Biography ==
Breugnon was born to the family of Marie Pauline Oriot de Coatamour and of Chef d'escadre Charles-Joseph Haudeneau de Breugnon. Breugnon joined the Navy as a Garde-Marine in 1733.

In 1746, he captained the 12-gun corvette Palme, on which he fought a British privateer off Calais. That same year, he was given command of the 22-gun frigate Dursley Galley, which he sailed between Brest and Port-Louis, Isle de France.

He was promoted to Lieutenant in 1751. In 1756, he commanded the 32-gun frigate Sirène, in the squadron under Beaussier de l'Isle, bound for Louisbourg and Quebec. In 1758, he commanded the 64-gun Bizarre at Quebec and Port-Louis.

He was promoted to Captain in 1757. In 1761, he commanded the 74-gun Diadème, making voyages between Saint-Domingue and Brest. The year after, he captained Protée. In 1765, he had command of the 32-gun frigate Licorne, and took part in the Larache expedition.

He was promoted to Chef d'escadre in 1767. That same year, he conducted a mission to Morocco with the 64-gun Union, ferrying diplomats to negotiate peace. From 1772 to 1775, he commanded the fleet at Brest. In 1774, he was involved in the inquiry into the fire that had destroyed Mars at Isle de France (Mauritius) the year before.

He was promoted to Lieutenant-général in on 1 March 1779. Between 1779 and 1784, he was commanding officer for the forces in Lorient. At the same time, Breugnon commanded a division in the fleet under Estaing, with his flag on the 80-gun Tonnant and Bruyères as his flag captain. He took part in the Battle of Rhode Island on 29 August 1778, in the Battle of Grenada on 6 July 1779, and during the Siege of Savannah. He then went to Saint-Domingue for health reasons, and was replaced with Barras.

In 1781, Breugnon commanded a division again, with his flag on the 116-gun Royal Louis, and with also the 110-gun Bretagne, the 32-gun frigate Concorde, and the 10-gun corvette Curieuse. The division departed Brest on 2 September and arrived at Cadiz on 1 October to make its junction with the fleet under Estaing.

In October 1782, Breugnon was president of a court-martial investigating Captain Sillans for the loss of the 74-gun Pégase at the Battle of Ushant on 21 April. Sillans was cashiered and expelled from the Navy. The year after, Breugnon presided the inquiry held in Lorient to investigate the events of the Battle of the Saintes. He was promoted to Vice-amiral in 1792.

Breugnon was murdered during the September Massacres in 1792.

== Sources and references ==
Notes

Bibliography

- Contenson, Ludovic (1934). La Société des Cincinnati de France et la guerre d'Amérique (1778-1783). Paris: éditions Auguste Picard. OCLC 7842336.
- Lacour-Gayet, Georges (1905). La marine militaire de la France sous le règne de Louis XVI. Paris: Honoré Champion. OCLC 763372623.
- Le Guennec, Louis (1905). "Excursion dans la commune de Ploujean". Société Archéologique du Finistère (32): 3–44.
- Taillemite, Étienne (2002). Dictionnaire des Marins français. Tallandier. ISBN 2-84734-008-4. OCLC 606770323.
- Troude, Onésime-Joachim (1867). Batailles navales de la France (in French). Vol. 2. Challamel ainé. OCLC 836362484.
