= Charles Picot de Dampierre =

French Navy officer and admiral

- Relatives: House of Dampierre
- Military career
- Branch: French Navy
- Rank: chef d'escadre
- Conflicts: War of Austrian Succession; Seven Years' War; American Revolutionary War

Charles Picot de Dampierre, also known as "chevalier de Dampierre", was a French Navy officer and admiral.

== Biography ==
=== Family ===
Charles Picot de Dampierre was born to the noble family of the House of Dampierre, originally from Champagne, ennobled in 1496. Dampierre was promoted to the status of Marquess in 1645. The family went extinct in 1871. Eight of its members served in the French Navy.

=== Career ===
Charles Picot de Dampierre joined the French Royal Navy in 1743 as a garde-marine. He was promoted to Ensign in 1748 at the end of the War of Austrian Succession and to Lieutenant in 1756, at the beginning of the Seven Years' War. By the end of the conflict, he had risen to Commander in 1764.

Dampierre rose to Captain in 1772. He took part in the American Revolutionary War. On 6 July 1779, he commanded the 74-gun Diadème in the squadron of Vice-Admiral d'Estaing, taking part in the Battle of Granada against the British forces under Admiral Byron. In 1782, he was in command of Bretagne. In 1748, he was promoted to chef d'escadre. In 1779, he joined the Knights Hospitalier.

== Notes and references ==
Bibliography

- G. Jeanton, Les commanderies du Temple Sainte-Catherine de Montbellet et de Rougepont, dans Annales de l'Académie de Mâcon : société des arts, sciences, belles-lettres, agriculture et encouragement au bien de Saône-et-Loire, 3e série, tome 20, 1916–1917, p. 157-158 (lire en ligne)
- Duckett, William (1854). Dictionnaire de la conversation et de la lecture (in French). éd. Aux comptoirs de la direction.
