= Ferm =

Ferm is a surname. Notable people with the surname include:

- Anders Ferm (1938–2019), Swedish diplomat and politician
- Björn Ferm (born 1944), Swedish modern pentathlete
- Charles Ferm (1566–1617), Scottish educator
- Hanna Ferm (born 2000), Swedish singer
- Jackie Ferm (born 1990), Swedish writer and model
- Olle Ferm (born 1947), Swedish swimmer
- Tyrone Ferm (born 1940), Swedish sprint canoeist
- Vergilius Ferm (1896–1974), American philosopher

== See also ==
- FERM domain
- Ferme (disambiguation)
