= Jacques Trublet de Villejégu =

Jacques Jérôme Antoine Trublet de Villejégu (Lorient, 17 November 1747 — Rennes, 21 June 1829) was a French Navy officer.

== Biography ==
Born to the family of Anne-Marguerite de Montigny and Michel Trublet, a captain of the French East India Company, Trublet started studying with the Jesuits to become a priest, graduating in Theology at the University of Rennes on 6 May 1765. However, he decided to change career and become a sailor.

On 22 December 1767, he departed to China with the East Indiaman Berryer. He then made a second journey on Gange. After the French East India Company disbanded, he sailed on several merchantmen. Although he had not passed the required exams, he received certificates from the Crown on 20 December 1779 authorising him to captain a ship, and took command of Marie-Anne de Sartines, a merchantman from Nantes bound for Isle de France (Mauritius).

On 21 December 1780, Trublet joined the French Royal Navy as a capitaine de brûlot, serving on the frigate Sérapis, under Captain Roche. After the accidental destruction of Sérapis, vicomte de Souillac appointed Trublet as first officer on the 56-gun Flamand, under Cuverville. He took part in the Battle of Negapatam on 6 July 1782.

At the Battle of Cuddalore, he was first officer on the 56-gun Flamand, and took command with distinction when her captain, Périer de Salvert, was killed.

After the battle, Trublet was promoted to lieutenant and made a Knight in the Order of Saint Louis upon recommendation from Suffren. Soon afterwards, her married with cousin Carré de Luzançay in Lorient.

He remained in the navy after the Peace of Paris in 1783, serving on the 74-gun Patriote from 20 September 1786 under Captain de Beaumont in the Caribbean. On 11 September 1790, he was given command of the 32-gun frigate Émeraude. He later transferred on Résolue.

On 13 October 1790, Trublet led a group of junior officers protesting the disorganisation of the navy at the outbreak of the French Revolution, publishing a memorandum on the subject with approval of the Crown. The letter was sent to the National Constituent Assembly and published.

On 28 July 1792, Trublet was promoted to captain, and on 31 July he was given command of the 74-gun Apollon.

At the Reign of Terror, he was stripped of rank and imprisoned, but survived to retire in Rennes. He never was authorised to rejoin the navy, but was still restored his rank and pension. There, he published Histoire de la Campagne de l'Inde, an account of the French campaign in the Indian Ocean during the War of American Independence, where Trublet is very critical of Périer de Salvert.

At the Bourbon Restoration, Trublet received an honorary promotion to rear-admiral. He was Deputy Mayor of Rennes, and a member of the Council of Ille-et-Vilaine.

== Sources and references ==
Notes

Bibliography

- Cunat, Charles (1852). Histoire du Bailli de Suffren. Rennes: A. Marteville et Lefas. p. 447. (biography of Trublet at pages 395 — 398)
- Lacour-Gayet, G. (1910). La marine militaire de la France sous le règne de Louis XV. Paris: Honoré Champion.
- Levot, Prosper (1866). Les gloires maritimes de la France: notices biographiques sur les plus célèbres marins (in French). Bertrand.
- Van Hille, Jean-Marc. "Éléonor Jacques Pérer de Salvert (1748-1783), Lieutenant de Vaisseau" (PDF). Archived from the original (PDF) on 22 March 2016.

Works

- Trublet de Villejégu, Jacques (1801). Histoire de la campagne de l'Inde par l'escadre française, sous les ordres de M. le bailli de Suffren, années 1781, 1782, 1783. Rennes: Veuve Bruté.
