= French ship Audacieux (1784) =

Ship of the line of the French Navy

- Scale model of Achille, sister ship of French ship Audacieux (1784), on display at the Musée national de la Marine in Paris.

History

France
- Name: Audacieux
- Namesake: "Audacious"
- Ordered: 15 February 1782
- Builder: Arsenal de Lorient
- Laid down: 8 July 1782
- Launched: 28 August 1784
- Commissioned: 1785
- Fate: Broken up in Brest in 1803

General characteristics
- Class & type: Téméraire-class ship of the line
- Displacement: 3,069 tonneaux
- Tons burthen: 1,537 port tonneaux
- Length: 55.87 m (183 ft 4 in)
- Beam: 14.46 m (47 ft 5 in)
- Draught: 7.15 m (23.5 ft)
- Depth of hold: 7.15 m (23 ft 5 in)
- Sail plan: Full-rigged ship
- Crew: 705
- Armament: 74 guns: Lower gun deck: 28 × 36-pounder long guns; Upper gun deck: 30 × 18-pounder long guns; Forecastle and Quarterdeck: 12 × 8-pounder long guns, 10 × 36-pounder carronades

Audacieux was a 74-gun Téméraire-class ship of the line built for the French Navy during the 1780s. Completed in 1785, she played a minor role in the Napoleonic Wars. The ship was condemned in 1802 and was scrapped the following year.

== Description ==
The Téméraire-class ships had a length of 55.87 metres (183 ft 4 in), a beam of 14.46 metres (47 ft 5 in) and a depth of hold of 7.15 metres (23 ft 5 in). The ships displaced 3,069 tonneaux and had a mean draught of 7.15 metres (23 ft 5 in). They had a tonnage of 1,537 port tonneaux. Their crew numbered 705 officers and ratings during wartime. They were fitted with three masts and ship rigged.

The muzzle-loading, smoothbore armament of the Téméraire class consisted of twenty-eight 36-pounder long guns on the lower gun deck and thirty 18-pounder long guns on the upper gun deck. On the quarterdeck and forecastle were a total of a dozen 8-pounder long guns and ten 36-pounder carronades.

== Construction and career ==
Audacieux was ordered in 1782 and named on 13 April. The ship was laid down at the Arsenal de Lorient on 8 July, but was not launched until 28 October 1784 and completed the following year. Between 1791 and 1793, she was decommissioned at Lorient. She was reactivated in 1793, and the next year, Audacieux rescued the Révolutionnaire, which had been dismasted after the Glorious First of June, by towing it to the Île-d'Aix by 8 June 1794. The ship was condemned on 9 November 1802, ordered to be broken up on 29 November, and scrapped on February-March 1803.
