= French ship Diligent (1762) =

Ship of the line of the French Navy

History

France
- Name: Diligent
- Builder: Lorient
- Laid down: April 1762
- Launched: November 1762
- In service: August 1763
- Out of service: June 1779
- Stricken: 21 June 1779
- Fate: Broken up on 1780

General characteristics
- Displacement: 3000 tonneaux
- Tons burthen: 1600 port tonneaux
- Length: 57.2 m (187 ft 8 in)
- Beam: 14.0 m (45 ft 11 in)
- Draught: 6.8 m (22 ft 4 in)
- Propulsion: Sail, full-rigged ship
- Armament: 74 guns

Diligent was a 74-gun ship of the line of the French Navy. She was funded by a don des vaisseaux donation from the headmasters of the Posts, and built on a design by Antoine Groignard.

From 1773, she was part of the Saint Malo squadron. She was ordered demolished after only six years, and broken up in Brest in 1780.
