= Don des vaisseaux =

1761 scheme to rebuild the French naval power

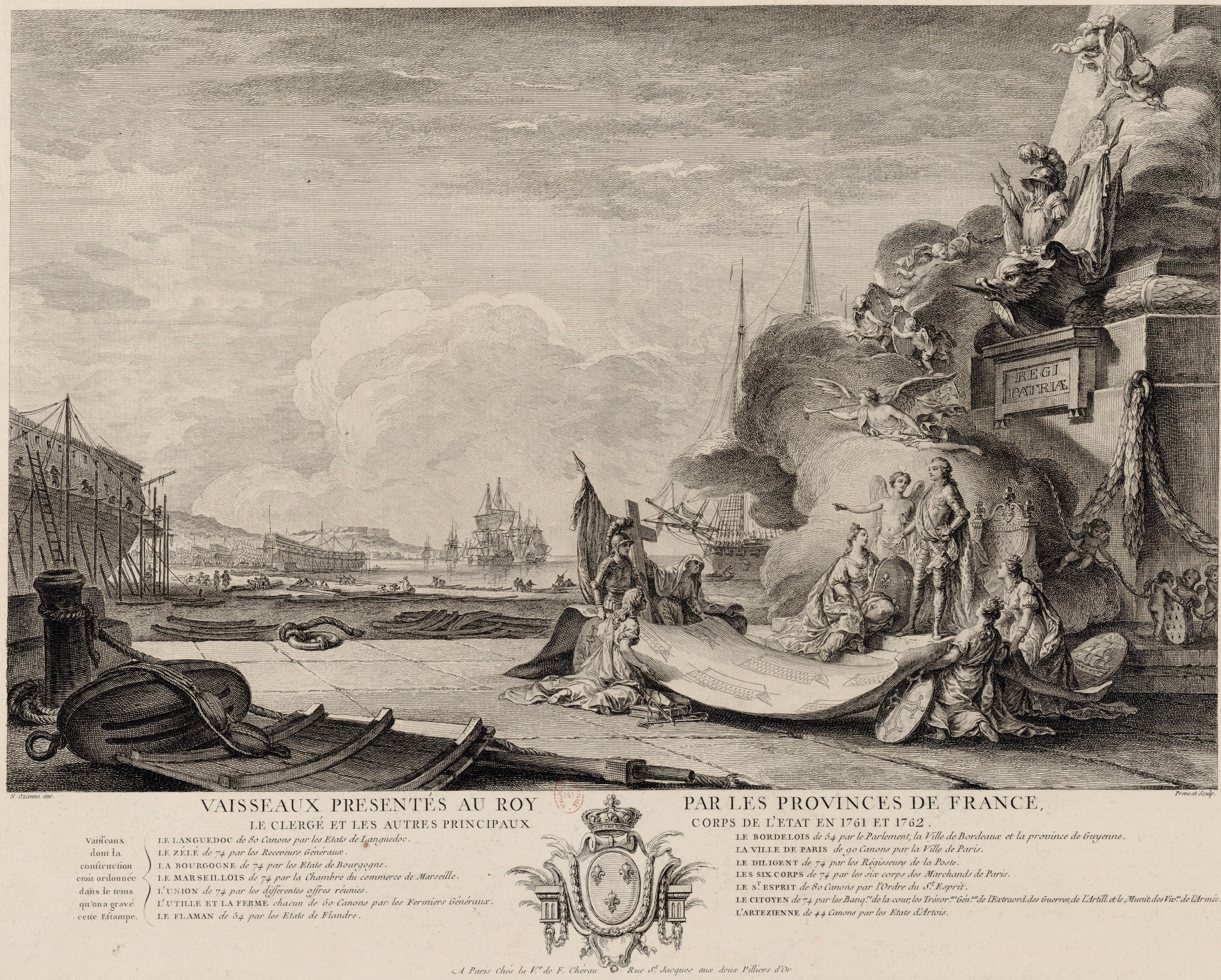
c. 1762 allegorical engraving of the don des vaisseaux, with an incomplete list of the ships built under the programme and their approximative armament

The don des vaisseaux (English: gift of ships of the line) was a subscription programme launched by the French statesman Étienne François de Choiseul, Duke of Choiseul in 1761 to rebuild the French Navy and make up for the losses it suffered in the Seven Years' War. Under the terms of the programme, the French public was encouraged to contribute funds for the construction of ships of the line. The programme raised 13 million livres from provinces, cities, institutions and private individuals, which were used to build 18 ships of the line for the French navy, including two first-rates, Ville de Paris and Bretagne.

All ships built under the programme were named either after their donors or qualities the donors wished to be associated with. Some ship names fell out of political favour during the French Revolution and were renamed between 1792 and 1794 under the National Convention's direction; in turn, some of the new names became politically unacceptable after the Thermidorian Reaction and were again changed in 1795. The success of the programme encouraged the French state to renew it on several occasions, including from 1782 to 1790 and again during the French Revolutionary and Napoleonic Wars.

== Background ==
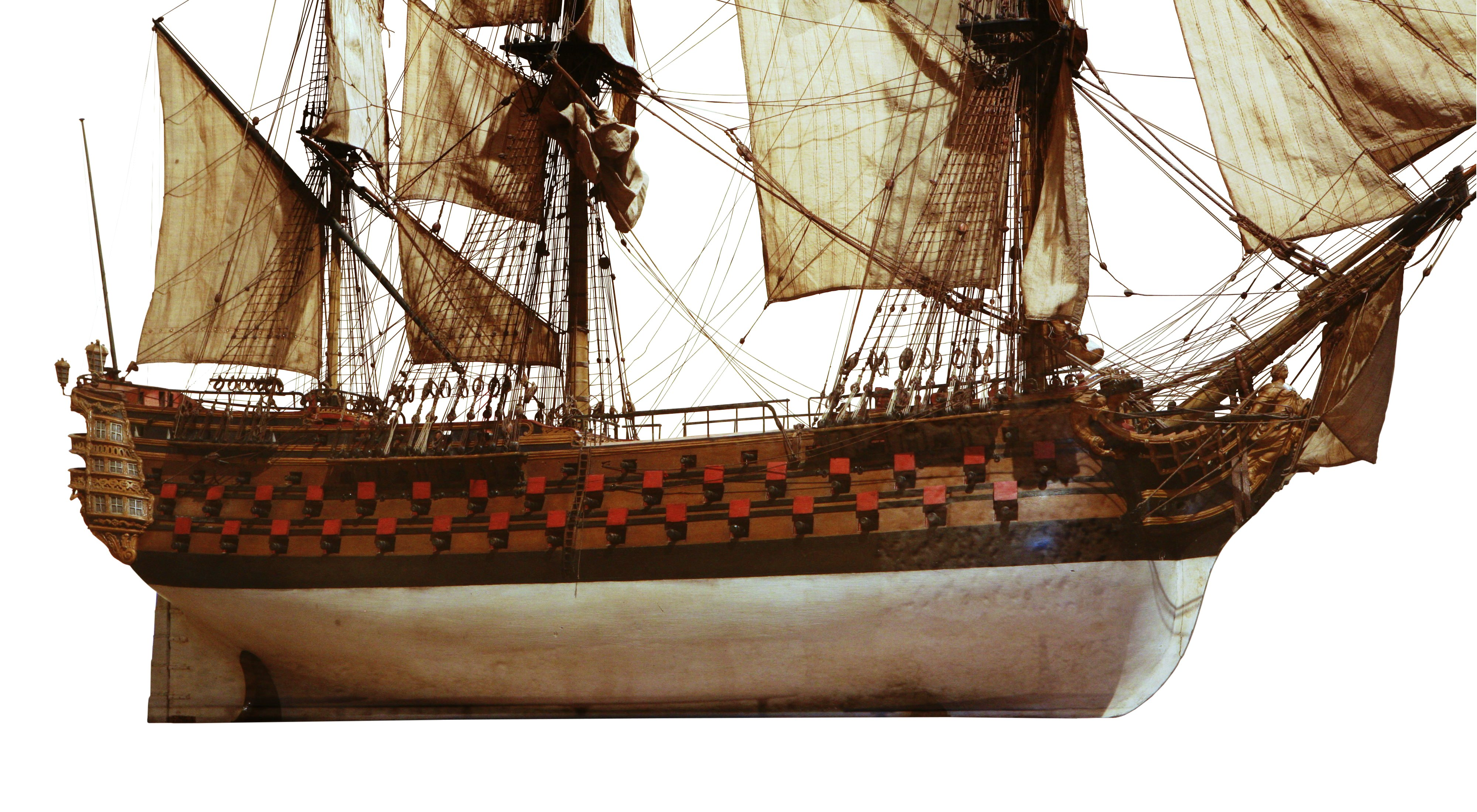
Bretagne, one of the first-rates built as a result of the programme

During the Seven Years' War, the French Navy suffered numerous defeats at the hands of the British Royal Navy. By 1761, the French navy had lost dozens of ships of the line in several engagements with the British, who as a result of their naval victories held command of the sea in both Europe and the Americas. As France was heavily in debt due to its war effort, it was impossible to fund the reconstruction of the French Navy through conventional means.

As such, the Secretary of State for the Navy, Étienne François de Choiseul, Duke of Choiseul, devised a subscription programme to raise the necessary funds. In 1761, Choiseul suggested to the Archbishop of Narbonne Charles Antoine de La Roche-Aymon, who presided over the Estates of Languedoc, to encourage the Estates' delegates to fund the construction of a 74-gun ship of the line via subscriptions. Choiseul hoped that this would set an example for other French organisations and private individuals to follow, which proved to be correct.

== Fundraising ==
On 26 November 1761, de La Roche-Aymon gave a speech before the delegates of the Estates of Languedoc, encouraging them

to offer His Majesty a ship of the line of 74 cannons and, by this gesture, to give the rest of France... the signal of what subjects truly worthy of the best of masters can and should do... There is no good Frenchman who does not feel animated by the desire to sacrifice everything to contribute to the efforts of the king and the wise and enlightened minister to restore the French navy. (Note: d'offrir à Sa Majesté un vaisseau de ligne de 74 pièces de canon et de donner par cette démarche au reste de la France... le signal de ce que peuvent et doivent faire les sujets véritablement dignes du meilleur des maîtres... Il n'est point de bon Français qui ne se sente animé du désir de tout sacrifier pour concourir aux efforts du roi et du ministre sage et éclairé pour restaurer la marine française)

The delegates obliged, and the example was followed the next year by the estates of Brittany, Burgundy, Artois and Flanders, the cities of Paris, Bordeaux, Montpellier and Marseille along with several private institutions and individuals such as the six corps de marchands and ferme générale.

Not only did the Provinces offer, in this occasion, distinguished marks of unusual zeal, but M. de Choiseul has told me that he received daily letters from individuals who volunteered money. Amongst others, there was the case of a simple gentleman from Champagne, whose name he sadly did not recall, and who stated that as he was not a rich man and had children, he was not really in any position to make a donation; but that, as they were still young, he could dispense with a thousand pounds that he had saved and that he sent them to him to be used in the service of the King. M. de Choiseul responded that his majesty, after accepting them, would return them so that they would assist in educating the children, who could not fail, with such a father, to render him great services. (Note: Non seulement les provinces donnèrent, dans cette occasion, des marques distinguées d'un zèle rare, mais M. de Choiseul m'a dit qu'il recevait journellement des lettres de particuliers qui lui offraient de l'argent. Il en eut une entre autres d'un simple gentilhomme de Champagne du nom duquel malheureusement il ne s'est pas souvenu, et qui lui mandait que n'étant pas riche et ayant des enfants, il n'était pas trop en état de donner; que cependant, comme ils étaient en bas âge, il pouvait se passer de mille écus qu'il avait amassés et qu'il les lui envoyait pour être employés au service du roi. M. de Choiseul lui répondit que sa Majesté, après les avoir acceptés, les lui restituait pour qu'ils aidassent à l'éducation de ses enfants, qui ne pouvaient manquer, avec un tel père, de lui rendre de grands services|Pierre de Besenval)

== Ships built through donations ==
Of the 30 ships of the line built for the French Navy between 1760 and 1769, 18 were funded by the don des vaisseaux programme, which raised 13 million livres. Two first-rates were built from funds raised using the programme, Ville de Paris and Bretagne, both of which participated in naval operations in the American Revolutionary War.

Ships funded through fundraising
Ship	Guns	Patron	Fate
Six Corps	74	Six corps de marchands	Decommissioned in August 1779 and broken up in 1780
Provence	64	Estates of Provence	Decommissioned in 1785 and broken up in 1786
Union	64	Private individuals	Wrecked in February 1782
Diligent	74	Head of Posts	Decommissioned in June 1779 and broken up in 1780
Bordelois	56	Bordeaux	Captured by HMS Romney on 1 July 1780 and sold in February 1786
Ferme	56	Ferme générale	Sold to the Ottoman Navy in 1774
Ferme	74	Ferme générale	Renamed Phocion on 1 October 1792, defected to the Spanish Navy on 11 January 1793 and broken up in 1808
Utile	56	Ferme générale	Decommissioned in 1771 and broken up in 1791
Flamand	56	Estates of Flanders	Decommissioned and broken up in 1785
Citoyen	74	Bankers and treasurers of the French Royal Army	Decommissioned in 1783 and broken up in 1791
Zélé	74	General Director of Finance	Decommissioned and broken up in 1806
Ville de Paris	90	Paris	Captured by HMS Barfleur at the battle of the Saintes and sunk in the 1782 Central Atlantic hurricane
Saint-Esprit	80	Order of the Holy Spirit	Renamed Scipion in April 1794 and wrecked on 26 January 1795
Artésien	64	Estates of Artois	Decommissioned in 1785
Languedoc	80	Estates of Languedoc	Renamed Antifédéraliste in 1794 and Victoire in 1795, decommissioned in 1798 and broken up in 1799
Bretagne	110	Estates of Brittany	Renamed Révolutionnaire in 1793, decommissioned on 28 January 1796 and broken up in May 1796
Marseillois	74	Chamber of commerce of Marseille	Renamed Vengeur du Peuple in 1794 and sunk at the Glorious First of June
Bourgogne	74	Estates of Burgundy	Wrecked on 4 February 1783

== Renewal of the fundraising ==
After a costly French defeat at the Battle of the Saintes, a new fundraising drive was organised, yielding five new ships. Another ship was later built from such funding during the Empire.

Ships funded through fundraising
Ship	Guns	Patron	Fate
Second fundraising (1782–1790)
Deux Frères	80	Count of Provence and Count of Artois	Renamed Juste in 1792, captured by HMS Queen Charlotte at the Glorious First of June and broken up in February 1811
Commerce de Bordeaux	74	Chamber of commerce of Bordeaux	Renamed Timoléon in February 1794, destroyed at the battle of the Nile
Commerce de Marseille	74	Chamber of commerce of Marseille	Renamed Lys on 19 July 1786 and Tricolore on 6 October 1792, burnt at the siege of Toulon
Commerce de Marseille	120	Chamber of commerce of Marseille	Captured by the Royal Navy at the siege of Toulon, decommissioned and broken up in 1802
États de Bourgogne	120	Estates of Burgundy	Renamed Côte d'Or on 27 January 1793, Montagne on 22 October 1793, Peuple on 17 May 1795 and Océan on 26 June 1795, decommissioned on 2 August 1850 and broken up in 1856
Third fundraising (1793–1794)
Fourth fundraising (27 May 1803)
Commerce de Paris	110	Six corps de marchands	Renamed Commerce in 1830, Borda in 1839 and Vulcain in 1863, decommissioned and broken up in 1885

== Notes and references ==
- (in French) LA BRETAGNE, 1766. Le renouveau de la Marine Française après la guerre de Sept Ans
