= Saint-Ferme =

- Commune
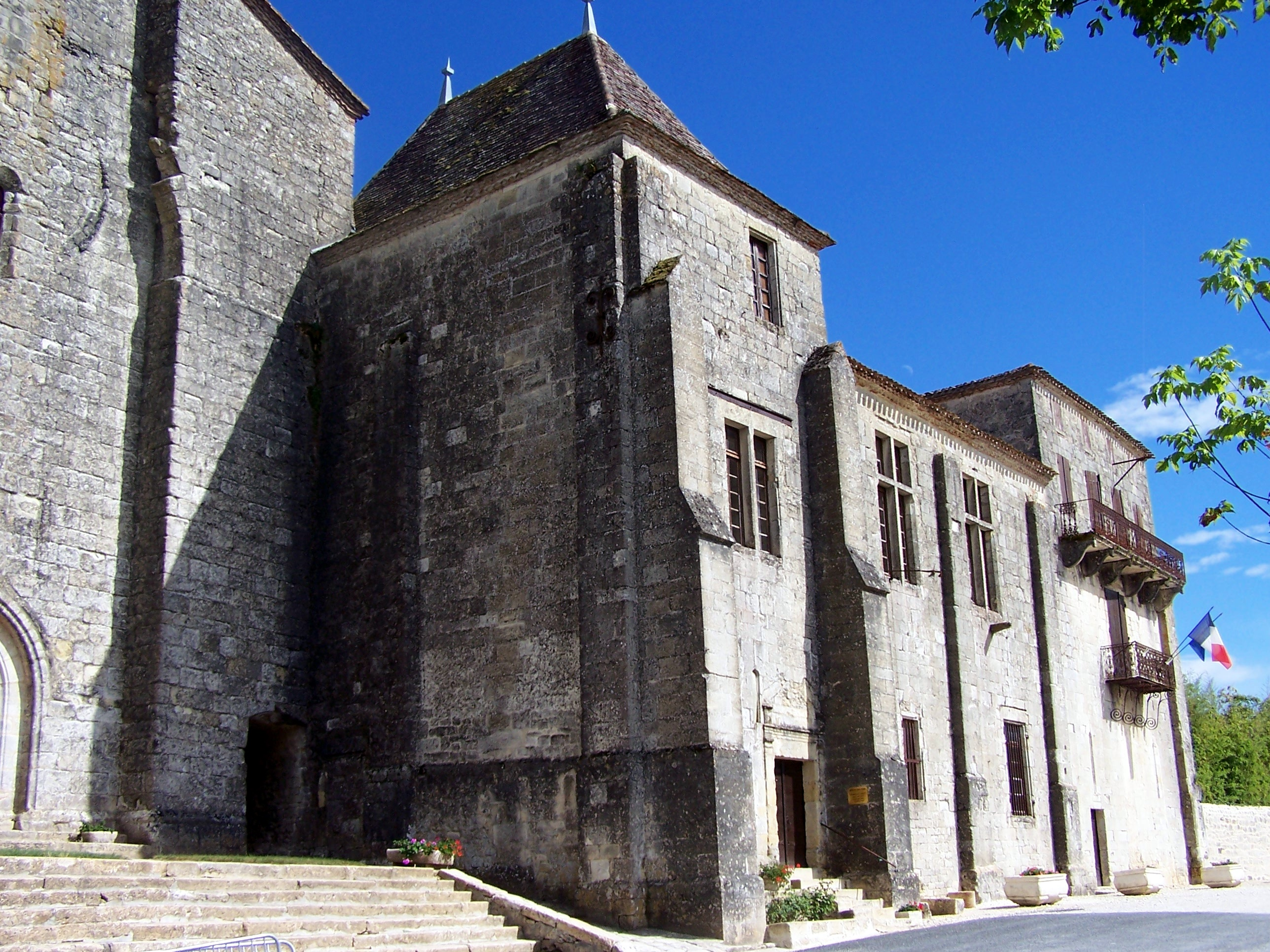
- The town hall in Saint-Ferme
- Location of Saint-Ferme
- Location within France Location within Nouvelle-Aquitaine
- Coordinates: 44°41′41″N 0°03′31″E
- Country: France
- Region: Nouvelle-Aquitaine
- Department: Gironde
- Arrondissement: Langon
- Canton: Le Réolais et Les Bastides

Government
  - Mayor (2020–2026): Marie-France Dalla-Longa
- Area^{1}: 20.09 km^{2} (7.76 sq mi)
- Highest elevation: 126 m (413 ft)
- Lowest elevation: 30 m (98 ft)
- Population (2023): 328
  - Density: 16.3/km^{2} (42.3/sq mi)
- Time zone: UTC+01:00 (CET)
  - Summer (DST): UTC+02:00 (CEST)
- INSEE/Postal code: 33400 /33580
- ^{1} French Land Register data, which excludes lakes, ponds, glaciers > 1 km^{2} (0.386 sq mi or 247 acres) and river estuaries.

Saint-Ferme (French pronunciation: [sɛ̃ fɛʁm]; Occitan: Sent Fèrmer) is a commune in the Gironde department in Nouvelle-Aquitaine in southwestern France.

== Population ==
Historical population
| Year | Pop. | ±% p.a. |
|---|---|---|
| 1968 | 505 | — |
| 1975 | 404 | −3.14% |
| 1982 | 382 | −0.80% |
| 1990 | 369 | −0.43% |
| 1999 | 338 | −0.97% |
| 2007 | 357 | +0.69% |
| 2012 | 360 | +0.17% |
| 2017 | 349 | −0.62% |
| 2023 | 328 | −1.03% |
Source: INSEE

== Abbey Church of Saint-Ferme ==
The church features a 12th-century nave and remarkably well-preserved Romanesque capitals, with themes such as Daniel in the Lions' Den and the Fall of Adam and Eve.

== See also ==
- Communes of the Gironde department
