= French ship Flamand =

Ship of the line of the French Navy

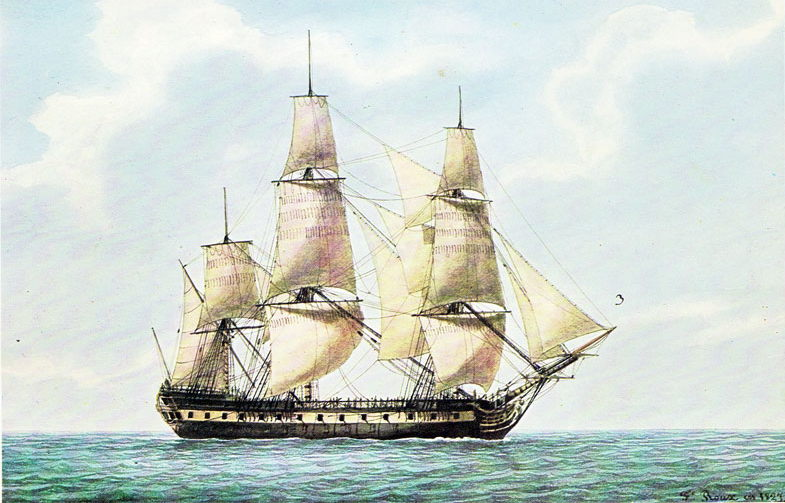
- Watercolour portrait of Flamand, by François Roux, commissioned by Willaumez

History

France
- Name: Flamand
- Namesake: Estates of Flanders
- Builder: Bordeaux
- Laid down: October 1763
- Launched: 11 May 1765
- In service: July 1765
- Out of service: 1785
- Fate: Broken up 1785

General characteristics
- Displacement: 2005 tonneaux
- Tons burthen: 1100 port tonneaux
- Length: 50.7 m (166 ft 4 in)
- Beam: 13.8 m (45 ft 3 in)
- Draught: 6.3 m (20 ft 8 in)
- Propulsion: Sail, full-rigged ship
- Complement: 560 men
- Armament: 56 guns: 24 × 36-pounder long guns; 26 × 18-pounder long guns; 6 × 8-pounder long guns

Flamand was a 56-gun Bordelois-class ship of the line of the French Navy. She was funded by a don des vaisseaux donation from the Estates of Flanders, and built by engineer Léon Guignace on a design by Antoine Groignard. She took part in Suffren's campaign during the American Revolutionary War.

== Career ==
Completed too late to serve in the Seven Years' War, Flamand was offered to the Ottoman Navy, along with her sister-ship Ferme; however the Ottoman were disappointed by the 100,000 piastres they had to pay for the first ship, and declined to purchase a second one.

Activated for the American Revolutionary War, Flamand was assigned to Suffren's squadron in the Indian Ocean.

At the Battle of Sadras, on 17 February 1782, Suffren ordered the 64-gun Ajax, under René Joseph Bouvet de Précourt, and Flamand, under Cuverville, to attack the British line to leeward. They both maneuvered to this effect, but then Tromelin, on Annibal, countermanded the order by signaling Ajax and Flamand to return to their post in the line of battle. While Ajax obeyed the order, Flamand sailed on and Saint-Félix, of Brillant, requested permission to replace Ajax.

In the Battle of Negapatam, she engaged the much stronger HMS Hero.

Flamand took part in the Battle of Cuddalore the next year; after her commanding officer, Lieutenant Perier de Salvert, was killed, her first officer, Jacques Trublet de Villejégu, assumed command.

The ship was condemned and broken up in 1785.
