= French ship Six Corps (1762) =

Ship of the line of the French Navy

History

France
- Name: Six Corps
- Namesake: The six corps of the Paris merchants.
- Builder: Lorient
- Laid down: April 1762
- Launched: 29 December 1762
- In service: September 1763
- Out of service: August 1779
- Fate: Broken up 1780
- Notes: Offered by the six corps of the Paris merchants.

General characteristics
- Displacement: 3000 tonneaux
- Tons burthen: 1600 port tonneaux
- Length: 57.2 m (187 ft 8 in)
- Beam: 14.0 m (45 ft 11 in)
- Draught: 6.8 m (22 ft 4 in)
- Propulsion: Sail, full-rigged ship
- Armament: 74 guns: Lower gun deck: 28 × 36 pdr long guns; Upper gun deck: 30 × 24 pdr long guns; Forecastle and quarterdeck: 16 × 8 pdr long guns

Six Corps was a 74-gun ship of the line of the French Navy. She was funded by a don des vaisseaux donation from the six corps that regrouped the merchants of Paris.

Six Corps was built in Lorient on plan by engineer Groignard. After her completion, she was commissioned under capitaine de aisseau de Choras, and departed Lorient on 13 September 1763, bound for Brest, where she arrived on 27 September.

Six Corps was then put in the reserve fleet, and never took part in any military operation. She was almost completely rebuilt in 1775, ordered on 21 June 1779 to be broken up, and broken up in 1780.
