= French ship Ferme (1785) =

Ship of the line of the French Navy

- Scale model of Achille, sister ship of French ship Ferme (1785), on display at the Musée national de la Marine in Paris.

History

France
- Name: Ferme
- Namesake: Ferme générale
- Builder: Brest
- Laid down: December 1784
- Launched: 16 September 1785
- Commissioned: 1786
- Renamed: Phocion, 1792
- Fate: Mutineers delivered to Spain

Spanish Empire
- Acquired: 1794
- Fate: Broken up, 1808

General characteristics
- Displacement: 3,069 tonneaux
- Tons burthen: 1,537 port tonneaux
- Length: 55.87 m (183 ft 4 in)
- Beam: 14.46 m (47 ft 5 in)
- Draught: 7.15 m (23.5 ft)
- Depth of hold: 7.15 m (23 ft 5 in)
- Sail plan: Full-rigged ship
- Crew: 705
- Armament: 74 guns: Lower gun deck: 28 × 36-pounder long guns; Upper gun deck: 30 × 18-pounder long guns; Forecastle and Quarterdeck: 12 × 8-pounder long guns, 10 × 36-pounder carronades

Ferme was a 74-gun Téméraire-class ship of the line built for the French Navy during the 1780s. Completed in 1786, she played a minor role in the Napoleonic Wars. Offered to the Crown by the Ferme générale as a Don des vaisseaux, she was renamed Phocion during the French Revolution. Her officers surrendered her to Spain in 1793 out of Royalist political convictions and she served in the Spanish Navy until 1808.

== Description ==
The Téméraire-class ships had a length of 55.87 metres (183 ft 4 in), a beam of 14.46 metres (47 ft 5 in) and a depth of hold of 7.15 metres (23 ft 5 in). The ships displaced 3,069 tonneaux and had a mean draught of 7.15 metres (23 ft 5 in). They had a tonnage of 1,537 port tonneaux. Their crew numbered 705 officers and ratings during wartime. They were fitted with three masts and ship rigged.

The muzzle-loading, smoothbore armament of the Téméraire class consisted of twenty-eight 36-pounder long guns on the lower gun deck, thirty 18-pounder long guns and thirty 18-pounder long guns on the upper gun deck. On the quarterdeck and forecastle were a total of a dozen 8-pounder long guns and 10 36-pounder carronades.

== Construction and career ==
Offered to the Crown by the Ferme générale as a Don des vaisseaux, Ferme was laid down at the Arsenal de Brest in December 1784, launched on 16 September 1785, and completed the following year. In September 1790, she was sent to the Caribbean, where she recaptured the naval schooner Bigotte on 10 November 1791. The next week, she recaptured Îlet Ramiers, whose garrison had rebelled. On 3 October 1792, she was renamed Phocion, but before the decree arrived, her officers had mutined against the French First Republic and were flying the Royalist white ensign. On 11 January 1793, they sailed her into Trinidad to surrender the ship to Spain.

Ferme was incorporated into the Spanish Navy in 1794, where she served until broken up in 1808.
