= French ship Union (1763) =

Ship of the line of the French Navy

History

France
- Name: Union
- Builder: Brest
- Laid down: 1761
- Launched: November 1763
- In service: May 1764
- Out of service: 1782
- Fate: Wrecked February 1782

General characteristics
- Displacement: 2250 tonneaux
- Tons burthen: 1087port tonneaux
- Length: 50.7 m (166 ft 4 in)
- Beam: 13.2 m (43 ft 4 in)
- Draught: 6.3 m (20 ft 8 in)
- Propulsion: Sail, full-rigged ship
- Armament: 64 guns

Union was a 64-gun ship of the line of the French Navy. She was funded by a don des vaisseaux donation from individuals.

The construction of Union, initially ordered in 1755, dragged on until 1763. In 1767, she cruised off Morocco under Captain Pierre-Claude Haudeneau de Breugnon.

In 1778, she was converted into a hospital ship and was appointed to a squadron under Admiral d'Orvilliers. She was eventually wrecked in February 1782.
