= Albion (1762 EIC ship) =

History

Great Britain
- Name: Albion
- Namesake: Albion
- Owner: John Hyde
- Builder: West, Rotherhithe
- Launched: March 1762
- Fate: Wrecked 1765

General characteristics
- Tons burthen: 668 (bm)
- Length: 116 ft (35 m)
- Beam: 33 ft (10 m)
- Propulsion: Sail
- Complement: 99
- Armament: 26 guns
- Notes: Three decks

Albion was an East Indiaman of the British East India Company (EIC), launched in 1762. She made one complete voyage for the EIC before wrecking at the outset of her second voyage.

Captain William Larkins sailed from the Downs on 25 April 1762, bound for China. Albion was at Portsmouth and on 6 May and reached Whampoa on 19 October. From there she sailed to Manila, crossing the Second Bar on 24 January 1763. Homeward-bound, she reached Malacca on 20 March and St Helena on 7 July, before arriving at Woolwich on 27 September.

Larkins was again her captain on her second voyage, this one intended for Bengal and China. Albion was at anchor in Margate Roads when a gale on 15 January 1765 wrecked her on the North Foreland. There was no loss of life.

Albion was carrying 47 chests of silver, coin and plate, She also carried 884 lead ingots (each of 185 lbs), and a number of coloured glass ingots. Salvors were able to recover 46 of the 47 chests of silver and about half the lead ingots.
