= French ship Ferme (1763) =

Ship of the line of the French Navy

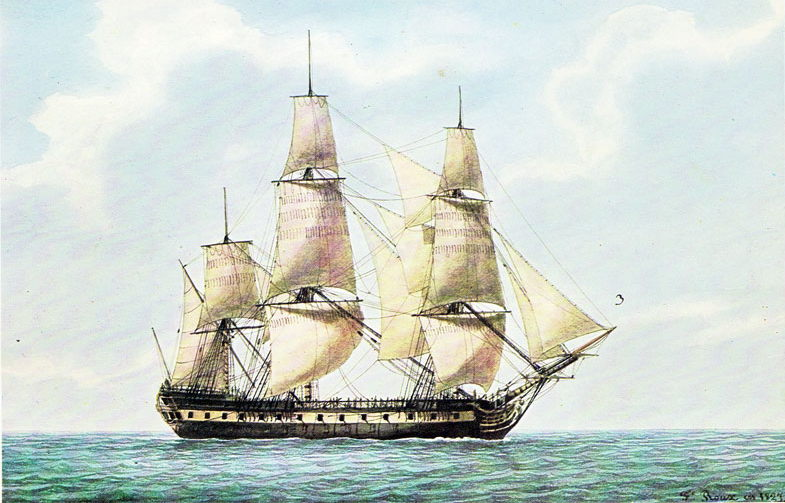
- Watercolour portrait of sister-ship Flamand, by François Roux, commissioned by Willaumez

History

France
- Name: Ferme
- Namesake: Ferme générale
- Builder: Bordeaux
- Laid down: August 1762
- Launched: 10 October 1763
- In service: 20 November 1763
- Out of service: August 1774
- Fate: Sold to the Ottomans 1774

Ottoman Empire
- Owner: Ottoman Navy

General characteristics
- Displacement: 2005 tonneaux
- Tons burthen: 1100 port tonneaux
- Length: 50.7 m (166 ft 4 in)
- Beam: 13.8 m (45 ft 3 in)
- Draught: 6.3 m (20 ft 8 in)
- Propulsion: Sail, full-rigged ship
- Complement: 560 men
- Armament: 56 guns: 24 × 36-pounder long guns; 26 × 18-pounder long guns; 6 × 8-pounder long guns

Ferme was a 56-gun Bordelois-class ship of the line of the French Navy. She was funded by a don des vaisseaux donation from the Ferme Générale, and built by engineer Léon Guignace on a design by Antoine Groignard. Complete too late to serve in the Seven Years' War, she was sold to the Ottoman Empire and recommissioned in the Ottoman Navy.
