= François Roux =

French painter and sculptor (1933–1980)

- Born: François Roux; 9 November 1933; Nice, France
- Died: 17 December 1980 (aged 47); Suresnes, France
- Known for: Painting, Sculpture
- Movement: Pop Art

François Roux, known as Francis Roux, was a French painter and sculptor. Born in 1933 in the French southern-city of Nice, Roux is associated with the Pop-Art movement through his use of "Pop-art techniques".

== Le Club des Jeunes ==
In 1952 Roux joined le Club des Jeunes de Nice, formed by Paul Mari and Robert Rovini. Every Saturday in the basement of a restaurant called Ballon d'Alsace, located on 65 rue Gioffredo, Roux met with poets, painters and sculptors such as Henri Maccheroni, Ange Falchi, Arman et par la suite Ben Vautier, Jacques Lepage, Paul Vincensini, René Decugis, and Jean Onimus.
