= Antoine Groignard =

French architect (1727–1799)

Antoine Groignard du Justin
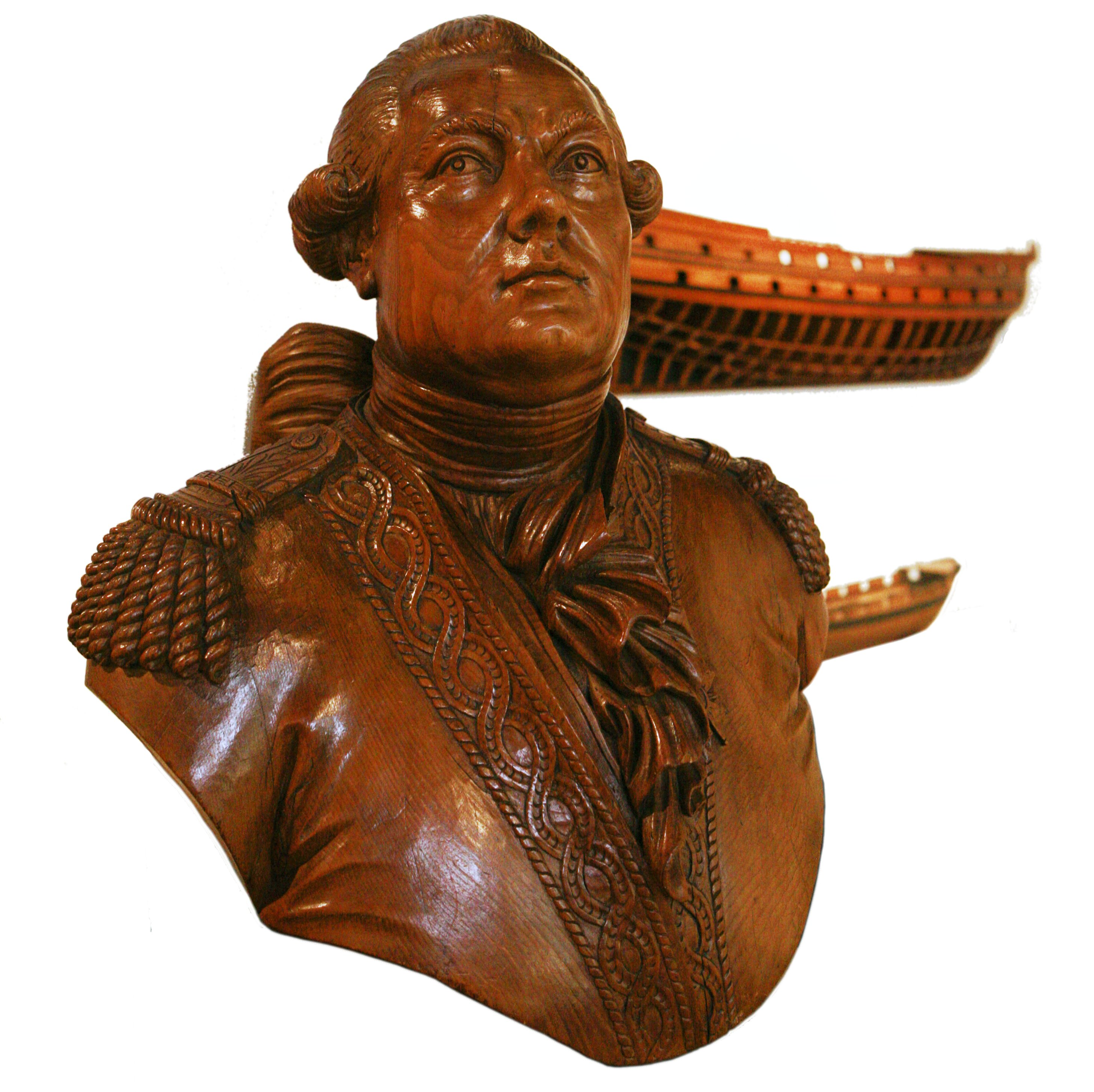
- Bust of Antoine Groignard at Toulon naval museum.
- Born: Antoine Groignard; 4 February 1727; Solliès-Pont, France
- Died: 26 July 1799 (aged 72); Paris, French Republic
- Spouse: Marie Élisabeth Catherine Boucher de la Boucherie (1767)
- Military career
- Allegiance: Kingdom of France
- Branch: French Navy; French Navy
- Service years: 1747–1790; 1792–1798
- Rank: Ingénieur général de la marine
- Unit: Corps of Naval Constructors
- Conflicts: Seven Years' War; Defense of Le Havre; French Revolutionary Wars
- Awards: Prize of the French Academy of Sciences 1759; Prize of the Académie de Marine 1765; Member of the Académie de Marine 1769; Knight of the Order of Saint Louis 1775; Ennobled 1780

Antoine Groignard (4 February 1727 – 26 July 1799), was a French naval constructor who developed standard designs for French war ships, and built and improved the dry docks at the French naval bases in Toulon and Brest.

== Family ==
Groignard was son of a master mariner, admiralty pilot, hydrographer and shipowner. In 1767 he married Marie Élisabeth Catherine Boucher de la Boucherie, a daughter of a captain of troops in the service of the French East India Company. The couple had a son and a daughter; the son becoming a frigate captain in the French navy.

== Career ==
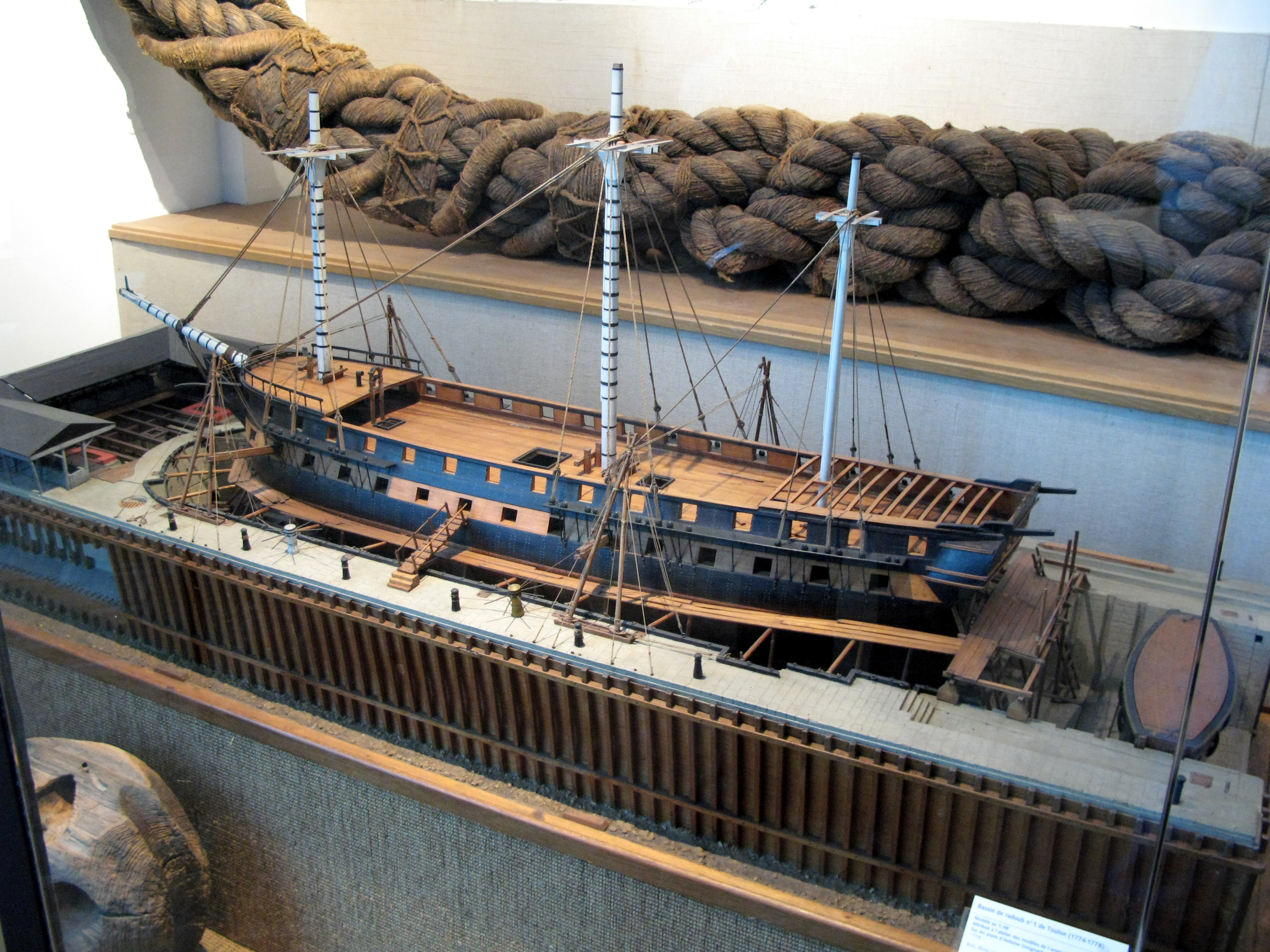
Model of the dry dock at Toulon.

Groignard became a student at the shipbuilding school in Paris (one of the predecessors of today's ENSTA ParisTech). Appointed assistant naval constructor at Brest in 1747 and at Rochefort 1749, he was promoted to naval constructor in 1754. Attached to the French East India Company at Lorient, he designed ships suitable for combat and commerce; among them the Duc de Duras that later became the famous American frigate Bon Homme Richard.

During the Seven Years' War, he distinguished himself in defending Le Havre against the British floating batteries. As an adviser to the minister of marine, he standardized the design of ships at the several naval dockyards of France. Promoted to chief constructor in 1769, he was put in charge of building the docks of Toulon, solving the difficult technical problems involved. In 1782 Groignard was promoted to constructor general with the rank of post-captain, working on the docks at Brest putting them in condition to receive the largest ships of the Navy. He notably directed the construction of Bretagne.

He retired due to sickness in 1790. He was recalled to duty in 1792 and was in charge of the construction of Port-de-Bouc from 1792 to 1795, and a project for draining the salt marshes of the Marignane in Saint-Miter from 1793 to 1794. Groignard was in charge of the naval administration of Toulon in preparation for the French campaign in Egypt and Syria.

== Awards ==
Groignard studied the stowage of ships and modified the positioning of the frames to increase its strength. In 1759 he was awarded the prize of the Academy of Sciences for a memoir on the solidity of vessels. In 1765, he won a prize from the Marine Academy with a memoir on the stowage of ships: "Mémoire sur l'arrimage des vaisseaux". Deputy member of this academy in 1752; full member 1769. Knight of the Order of Saint Louis 1775. Raised to nobility in 1780.

== Legacy ==
Rue Antoine Groignard is a street in Toulon named after him.
