= List of shipwrecks in November 1820 =

The following ships were sunk, wrecked or otherwise lost during November 1820.

== 1 November ==
List of shipwrecks: 1 November 1820
Ship	State	Description
Fortitude	United Kingdom	The schooner sank in the St. Lawrence River.

== 2 November ==
List of shipwrecks: 2 November 1820
Ship	State	Description
Naylor	United Kingdom	The ship ran aground on the Gunfleet Sand, in the North Sea off the coast of Essex. She was on a voyage from London to Hull, Yorkshire. Naylor was later refloated and taken in to Harwich, Essex.

== 3 November ==
List of shipwrecks: 3 November 1820
Ship	State	Description
Jason	United Kingdom	The ship was driven ashore at South Foreland, Kent. She was on a voyage from Cork to London. Jason was refloated on 6 November and resumed her voyage.

== 4 November ==
List of shipwrecks: 4 November 1820
Ship	State	Description
Thomas	United Kingdom	The brig foundered in the Irish Sea off Milford Haven, Pembrokeshire. Her crew were rescued by Barley-Corn (United Kingdom). She was on a voyage from Swansea, Glamorgan to Wexford.

== 5 November ==
List of shipwrecks: 5 November 1820
Ship	State	Description
Concord	United Kingdom	The ship was driven ashore and wrecked at Brighton, Sussex. Her crew were rescued.
Lady Sherbrooke	United Kingdom	The ship was lost in the Cranberry Isles, Maine, United States.
Paulina	United Kingdom	The ship was in collision with Reliance (United Kingdom) off Great Yarmouth, Norfolk. Both vessels sank, their crews were rescued.
Prince of Saxe-Coburg	United Kingdom	The ship was driven ashore at Brighton. Her crew were rescued.
Sussex	United Kingdom	The ship was driven ashore at Brighton. Her crew were rescued. She was later refloated and taken in to Newhaven, Sussex.
Thomas	United Kingdom	The ship foundered in the Irish Sea off Milford Haven, Pembrokeshire. Her crew were rescued. She was on a voyage from Swansea, Glamorgan to an Irish port.
Two Sisters	United Kingdom	The ship was driven ashore and severely damaged at Brighton. Her crew were rescued.
Vine	United Kingdom	The brig was driven ashore and severely damaged at Brighton. Her crew were rescued. She was later refloated and taken in to Newhaven, Sussex.

== 6 November ==
List of shipwrecks: 6 November 1820
Ship	State	Description
Colette Charlotte	United Kingdom of the Netherlands	The ship struck the pier at Ramsgate, Kent, United Kingdom and sank. She was on a voyage from Vila Nova de Gaia, Portugal to Ostend, West Flanders.
Don	United Kingdom	The ship was driven ashore at Falsterbo, Sweden. She was on a voyage from Saint Petersburg, Russia to Newcastle-upon-Tyne, Northumberland.

== 8 November ==
List of shipwrecks: 8 November 1820
Ship	State	Description
Acorn	United Kingdom	The brig was wrecked on "Dolus Island", Red Wharf Bay, Anglesey. She was on a voyage from Liverpool, Lancashire to Jamaica
Barossa	United Kingdom	The ship was wrecked on the Southern Fourth Reef. Her crew were rescued. She was on a voyage from British Honduras to London.
Eleanora	Elbing	The ship was driven ashore at Saltfleet, Lincolnshire, United Kingdom. She was on a voyage from Elbing to London, United Kingdom. Eleanora was refloated in mid-December.
Oaks	United Kingdom	The ship was lost near Margate, Kent with the loss of all hands. She was on a voyage from London to Saint Vincent, Virgin Islands.
Tobago	United Kingdom	The ship ran aground at Demerara. She was on a voyage from Demerara to London.

== 9 November ==
List of shipwrecks: 9 November 1820
Ship	State	Description
Biene	Stettin	The ship was driven ashore near Swinemünde, Prussia. She was on a voyage from Saint Petersburg, Russia to Stettin.
Colina	Norway	The ship foundered in the North Sea off Bergen. She was on a voyage from Stavanger to Bergen.
Gustaff	Bremen	The ship was driven ashore at Skagen, Denmark. She was on a voyage from Bremen to Riga, Russia.
Jane	United Kingdom	The ship struck the Whitford Sher, off Llanmadoch Hill, Glamorgan and sank. Her crew were rescued.
Salus	United Kingdom	The smack ran aground on the Red Sand off the north Kent coast. She floated off and sank. Her crew survived.
Speculation	United Kingdom	The ship sprang a leak and sank off Swinemünde.
Venus	United Kingdom	The ship was driven ashore at Littlehampton, Sussex. She was on a voyage from Sunderland, County Durham to Littlehampton.
Unnamed	United Kingdom	The West Indiaman was wrecked off Margate, Kent with the loss of all hands.

== 11 November ==
List of shipwrecks: 11 November 1820
Ship	State	Description
Amelia	Russia	The ship was driven ashore and wrecked at Swinemünde, Prussia.
Concordia	Prussia	The ship was driven ashore at Swinemünde.
Emelie Sophia	Prussia	The ship was driven ashore and wrecked at Swinemünde.
Gute Eywachting	Prussia	The ship was driven ashore and wrecked at Swinemünde.
Hazard	United Kingdom	The ship was driven ashore and wrecked at Swinemünde.
Ludwig	Prussia	The ship was driven ashore at Swinemünde.
Neptunus	Prussia	The ship was driven ashore at Swinemünde.
Perseverance	United Kingdom	The ship was driven ashore at Swinemünde.

== 12 November ==
List of shipwrecks: 12 November 1820
Ship	State	Description
Robert Stewart	United Kingdom	The ship was driven ashore and wrecked at Mockbeggar, Cheshire. Her crew were rescued. She was on a voyage from Wexford to Liverpool, Lancashire.

== 13 November ==
List of shipwrecks: 13 November 1820
Ship	State	Description
Ariadne	United Kingdom	The brig was abandoned in the Atlantic Ocean.
Betsey	United Kingdom	The ship foundered in the Irish Sea off Holyhead, Anglesey with the loss of all hands. She was on a voyage from Dublin to Liverpool, Lancashire.
Diligence	United Kingdom	The ship was driven ashore near Wicklow. She was on a voyage from London to Dublin. Diligence was refloated on 16 November and resumed her voyage.
Freedom	Sweden	The ship departed from New York, United States for Gothenburg. No further trace, presumed foundered with the loss of all hands.
Heart of Oak	United Kingdom	The sloop foundered in the Irish Sea off Waterford. Her crew were rescued by Reffley (United Kingdom). She was on a voyage from Baltimore, County Cork to Liverpool.
Jane	United Kingdom	The ship caught fire and was abandoned off Cape Ray, Newfoundland, British North America.
Plover	United Kingdom	The ship was wrecked in the Atlantic Ocean with the loss of four of her seven crew. Survivors were rescued by Blucher Packet (United Kingdom). Plover was on a voyage from Newfoundland, British North America to Liverpool.
Sherburn	United Kingdom	The ship was lost near Christiansø, Denmark. Her crew were rescued. She was on a voyage from London to Riga, Russia.

== 14 November ==
List of shipwrecks: 14 November 1820
Ship	State	Description
Brigetta Sophia	Denmark	The ship was wrecked on Læsø. Her crew were rescued. She was on a voyage from Amsterdam, North Holland, Netherlands to Copenhagen.
Odin	Norway	The ship was driven ashore at Lowestoft, Suffolk, United Kingdom. She was on a voyage from Hammersand to Lisbon, Portugal.

== 15 November ==
List of shipwrecks: 15 November 1820
Ship	State	Description
Charlton	(United Kingdom of Great Britain and Ireland) British North America	The ship foundered in the Atlantic Ocean off Antigua. Her crew were rescued. She was on a voyage from Barbados to Saint John, New Brunswick.
Divina Providencia	Portugal	The ship departed from Oporto for Rio de Janeiro, United Kingdom of Portugal, Brazil and the Algarves. No further trace, presumed foundered in the Atlantic Ocean with the loss of all hands.
Jane	United Kingdom	The ship, which had sprung a leak two days earlier, was abandoned in the Atlantic Ocean. Her crew were rescued by Mayflower. She was on a voyage from Quebec, British North America to Ayr.
Pera Desirée	France	The ship was wrecked near Calais. She was on a voyage from Hamburg to Havre de Grâce, Seine-Inférieure.

== 16 November ==
List of shipwrecks: 16 November 1820
Ship	State	Description
Commerce	United Kingdom	The ship was lost neat Peniche, Portugal.
Henry	United Kingdom	The ship was driven ashore at the mouth of the Vistula. She was refloated in late December.

== 17 November ==
List of shipwrecks: 17 November 1820
Ship	State	Description
Betsey	United Kingdom	The ship was driven ashore at Les Sables d'Olonne, Vendée, France. She was on a voyage from Newcastle upon Tyne, Northumberland to Rochefort, Charente-Maritime, France.
Glasgow	United Kingdom	The ship was driven ashore on Bornholm, Denmark. She was on a voyage from London to Königsberg, Prussia. Glasgow was refloated on 20 November and taken in to Rønne, Denmark.
Peter Elizabeth	Norway	The ship was driven ashore and wrecked at Dungeness, Kent, United Kingdom. She was on a voyage from Bordeaux, Gironde, France to Frederickstadt.
William & Ann	United Kingdom	The ship was driven ashore near Eckwarden, Grand Duchy of Oldenburg. She was on a voyage from Greenock, Renfrewshire to Bremen.

== 18 November ==
List of shipwrecks: 18 November 1820
Ship	State	Description
Isabella	United Kingdom	The ship ran aground off Bermuda. She was on a voyage from Saint John, New Brunswick, British North America to Jamaica. Isabella was later refloated and taken in to St. George's, Bermuda.

== 19 November ==
List of shipwrecks: 19 November 1820
Ship	State	Description
Atlantic	United Kingdom	The ship was driven ashore and severely damaged at Filey Bridge, Yorkshire. She was on a voyage from Sunderland, County Durham to London. Atlantic was later refloated and taken in to Scarborough, Yorkshire.
Betsey	United Kingdom	The ship foundered in the Irish Sea off Holyhead, Anglesey with the loss of all hands. She was on a voyage from Dublin to Liverpool, Lancashire.
Mary	United Kingdom	The ship departed from Drogheda, County Louth for Liverpool. No further trace, presumed foundered with the loss of all hands.
Mary and Susan	United Kingdom	The ship foundered in the North Sea off Heligoland. Hew crew survived. She was on a voyage from Sunderland, County Durham to Hamburg.

== 20 November ==
List of shipwrecks: 20 November 1820
Ship	State	Description
Ceres	United Kingdom	The ship was driven ashore in Dundalk Bay. She was on a voyage from Liverpool, Lancashire to the United Kingdom of Portugal, Brazil and the Algarves. Ceres was later refloated and taken in to Dublin.
Essex	United States	Essex A sperm whale rammed and sank the whaler in the Pacific Ocean with the ultimate loss of twelve of her twenty crew.
Friends	United Kingdom	The ship was wrecked at Wick, Caithness. Her crew were rescued. She was on a voyage from Wick to an Irish port.
Friends	United Kingdom	The sloop caught fire, exploded and sank at Campbeltown, Argyllshire.
Hazard	United Kingdom	The ship struck the pier and sank at Ramsgate, Kent. She was on a voyage from Sunderland, County Durham to Ramsgate.
Jane McCleary	United Kingdom	The ship departed from Newfoundland, British North America for London. No further trace, presumed foundered with the loss of all hands.
Nepeau	United Kingdom	The ship was driven ashore at New Romney, Kent. She was on a voyage from London to Bridport, Dorset. Nepeau was refloated on 4 December.

== 21 November ==
List of shipwrecks: 21 November 1820
Ship	State	Description
Bordeaux Packet	United Kingdom	The ship foundered in the Irish Sea off the Copeland Islands, County Down. She was on a voyage from Liverpool, Lancashire to Londonderry.
Helena	Russia	The ship was lost in the Aspö Islands, Grand Duchy of Finland. She was on a voyage from Saint Petersburg to Hull, Yorkshire, United Kingdom.
Henry	United Kingdom	The brig capsized and sank in a squall off Dunbar, Lothian with the loss af a crew member. She was on a voyage from Great Yarmouth, Norfolk to Leith, Lothian.
Peace	United Kingdom	The ship ran aground on the Corton Sand, in the North Sea off the coast of Suffolk. She was on a voyage from Great Yarmouth to London.

== 23 November ==
List of shipwrecks: 23 November 1820
Ship	State	Description
Hazard	United Kingdom	The ship sank at Kingsgate, Kent.
Success	United Kingdom	The ship was run down and sunk in the River Thames at Blackwall, Middlesex by Mary (United Kingdom). Success was on a voyage from London to Boston, Lincolnshire. She was later refloated and returned to London.

== 24 November ==
List of shipwrecks: 24 November 1820
Ship	State	Description
Apollo	United Kingdom	The ship was sighted of Saint Kitts whilst on a voyage from Demerara to St. John's, Newfoundland, British North America. No further trace, presumed foundered with the loss of all hands.

== 25 November ==
List of shipwrecks: 25 November 1820
Ship	State	Description
Abeona	United Kingdom	The transport ship was destroyed by fire in the Atlantic Ocean (4°30′N 25°30′W) with the loss of 113 of the 162 people on board. The survivors were rescued by Condessa da Ponte (Portugal).
Alicia Hill	United Kingdom	The ship was driven ashore and severely damaged at Odesa, Russia. She subsequently broke up.
Jane	United Kingdom	The ship departed from Newfoundland, British North America for London. No further trace, presumed foundered with the loss of all hands.
John & James	United Kingdom	The ship struck rocks off Greenore Point, County Louth and was abandoned. She was on a voyage from Bristol, Gloucestershire to Waterford. John and James was refloated the next day and taken in to Wexford.
Truro	United Kingdom	The ship was wrecked on the Stoney Binks, in the North Sea off the mouth of the Humber. Her crew were rescued.

== 27 November ==
List of shipwrecks: 27 November 1820
Ship	State	Description
Dry Harbour Planters	United Kingdom	The ship was wrecked at St. Anns, Jamaica.
Johannes	United Kingdom	The ship was wrecked on Cape Sable Island, British North America. She was on a voyage from Saint John, New Brunswick to Newfoundland, British North America.

== 29 November ==
List of shipwrecks: 29 November 1820
Ship	State	Description
Bellona	France	The ship was wrecked on Île Bourbon, All on board were rescued.

== Unknown date ==
List of shipwrecks: Unknown date in November 1820
Ship	State	Description
America	(United Kingdom of Great Britain and Ireland) British North America	The ship was abandoned in the Atlantic Ocean before 26 November.
Arabe	France	The ship was lost near Maranhão, United Kingdom of Portugal, Brazil and the Algarves before 4 December. She was on a voyage from Marseille, Bouches-du-Rhône to Maranhão.
Christopher	United States	The ship was lost off the Abaco Islands in mid-November. Her crew were rescued.
Friendship	United Kingdom	The ship was lost near Harwich, Essex.
Hesperus	Netherlands	The ship was driven ashore on Møn, Denmark. She was on a voyage from Amsterdam, North Holland to Rostock.
Industry	United Kingdom	The ship was lost near Lowestoft, Suffolk.
Jonge Hendrik	Netherlands	The ship was driven ashore near Saint Petersburg, Russia. She was on a voyage from Bordeaux, Gironde, France to Saint Petersburg.
Joseph	United Kingdom	The ship was lost near "Crosswell".
Matilda	Lübeck	The ship was lost near the mouth of the Garonne.
Neutralitat	Netherlands	The ship ran aground in the Vlie. She was on a voyage from Amsterdam, North Holland to Stettin. Neutralitat was later refloated and taken in to Harlingen, Friesland.
Paix	France	The ship was driven ashore at La Rochelle, Charente-Maritime. She was on a voyage from Havana, Cuba to Havre de Grâce, Seine-Inférieure.
Perseverance	United Kingdom	The ship was driven ashore and wrecked on Hogland, Russia. She was on a voyage from London to Saint Petersburg, Russia.
Regent	United Kingdom	The ship was driven ashore on Hogland. She was on a voyage from London to Saint Petersburg.
Resolution	United Kingdom	The ship departed from Gijón, Spain for London. Presumed subsequently lost with all hands. One of her boats was discovered off the coast of County Clare in March 1821.
Sophia	United Kingdom	The ship foundered in the North Sea.
Speculator	United Kingdom	The ship was wrecked at Cape Ray, Newfoundland, British North America. She was on a voyage from New Brunswick, British North America to Cork.
Triton	United Kingdom	The ship departed from Whitehaven, Cumberland for Newry, County Antrim. No further trace, presumed foundered in the Irish Sea with the loss of all hands.
Triumph	(United Kingdom of Great Britain and Ireland) British North America	The ship departed from Saint John, New Brunswick for Saint Vincent, Virgin Islands in mid-November. No further trace, presumed foundered with the loss of all hands.
Valentine	United Kingdom	The smack was wrecked on the coast of Cornwall.
West Indian	United Kingdom	The ship foundered in the Kattegat. Her crew were rescued.
