= Herman Moll =

British cartographer and publisher (d. 1732)

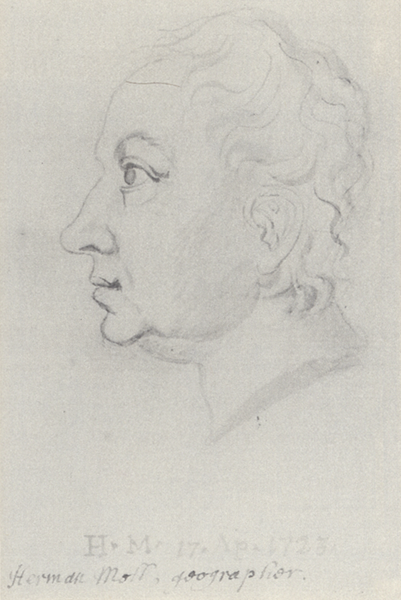
- A portrait of Herman Moll by William Stukeley (1723)
- Born: c. 1654; Amsterdam (likely) or Bremen
- Died: September 22, 1732 (aged 77–78); London, Great Britain
- Occupations: Cartographer; engraver; publisher
- Known for: The "Beaver Map"; The World Described; Cartography of the British Empire

Herman Moll (mid-17th century – 22 September 1732) was a British cartographer, engraver, and publisher.

== Origin and early life ==
While Moll's exact place and date of birth are unknown, he was probably born in the mid-17th century in Germany or the United Provinces. The earliest extant mention of Moll was made by the natural philosopher Robert Hooke, who recorded in 1678 that Moll was working in London as an engraver. Moll later specialized in engraving maps, and went on to produce maps and globes from his studies of the work of other cartographers.

== Cartographic work ==
=== Early years in London ===
Moll probably sold his first maps from a stall in various places in London. From 1688 he had his own shop in Wanley's Court in London's Blackfriars. Between 1691 and 1710 his business was located at the corner of Spring Gardens and Charing Cross, and he finally moved along the River Thames to the Strand where he remained until his death.

In the 1690s, Moll worked mainly as an engraver for Christopher Browne, Robert Morden and Lea, in whose business he was also involved. In the first years of the eighteenth century, Moll began to compile and engrave maps solely under his own name.

=== Work as an independent publisher ===
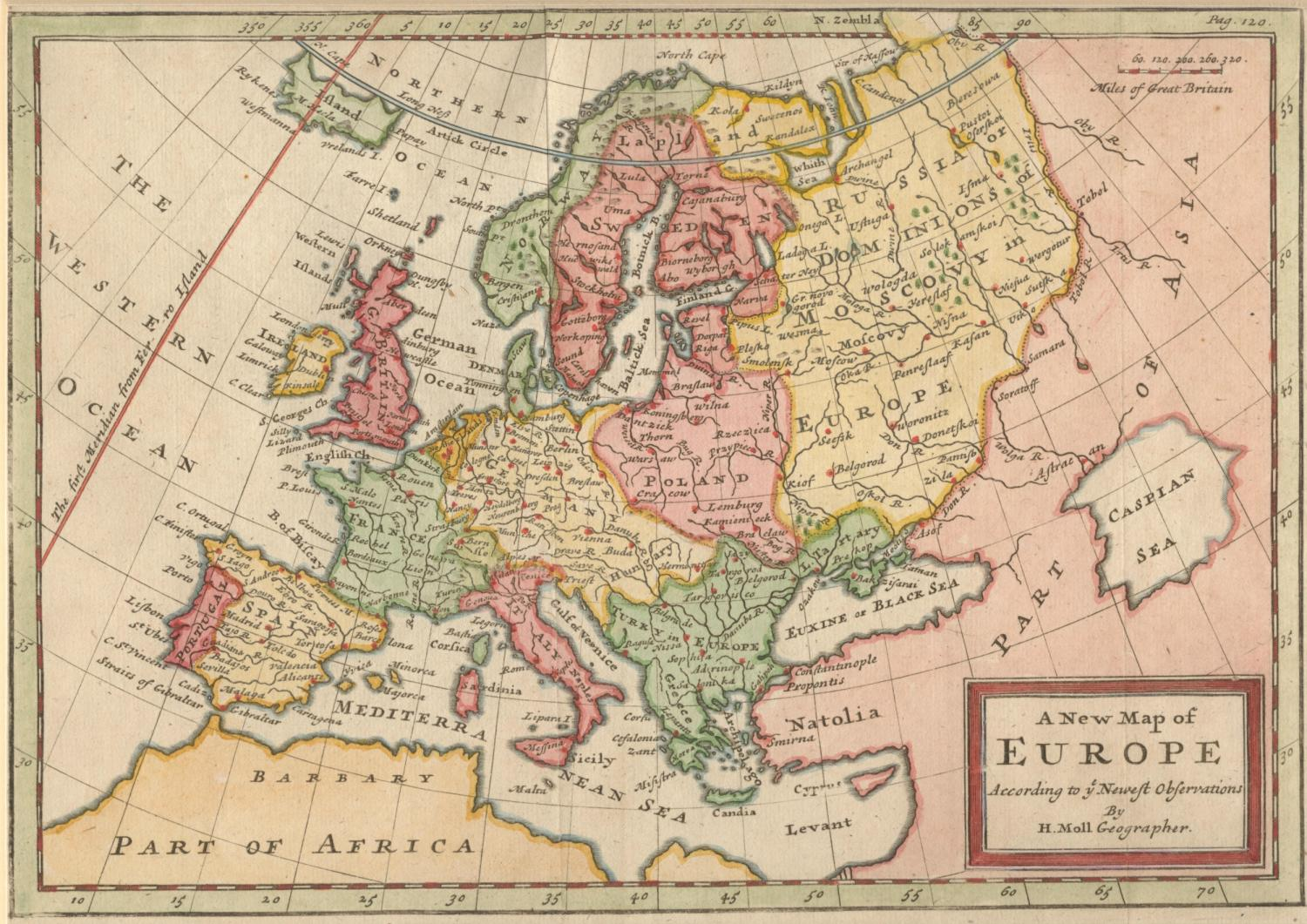
A New Map of Europe According to the Newest Observations (1721)

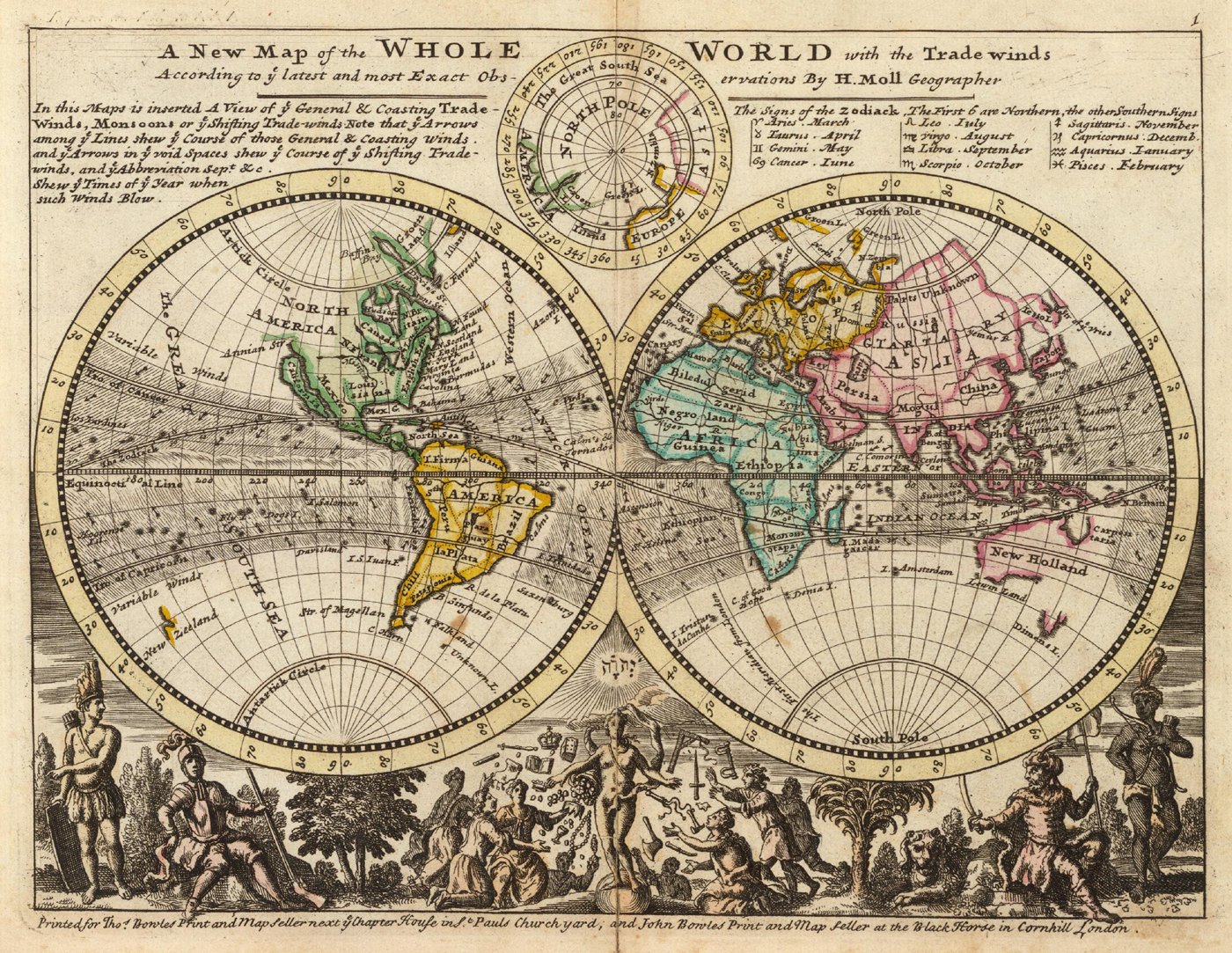
A new map of the whole world with the trade winds (1736)

In 1701 A System of Geography, a geographical reference book, was published featuring many maps engraved by Moll. Several subsequent editions were issued, and Moll's name became so closely associated with it that it was often called "Moll's Geography".

In the years that followed he brought out several volumes including Fifty-six new and accurate maps of Great Britain, a book of maps of the British Isles. In 1707 he began his Atlas Geographus, which appeared in monthly deliveries from 1707 to 1717, and eventually comprised five volumes. This included a full geographical representation of the world in colour maps and illustrations. As with his earlier works, the Atlas Geographus was eagerly copied and imitated.

In 1710 he began producing artfully crafted pocket globes. These were each a pair of globes, with the larger, hinged celestial globe encircling a smaller globe. On the latter he often included the route of Dampier's circumnavigation. These globes are very rare today.

In 1715 Moll issued The World Described, a collection of thirty large, double-sided maps which saw numerous editions. In these maps Moll's skill as an engraver is particularly clear. These were bound separately and then later sold in the form of atlases in a joint venture between a number of other publishers.

The series included two of the most famous Moll maps: A new and exact map of the dominions of the King of Great Britain and To The Right Honorable John Lord Sommers...This Map of North America According To Ye Newest and Most Exact Observations. These were distinctive for their elaborate cartouches and images, and are known respectively as the Beaver Map and the Codfish Map. As with much of his work, Moll used these maps to publicize and support British policy and regional claims throughout the world.

The Codfish Map shows in its cartouches a scene from the cod fisheries off Newfoundland. Since the beginning of the 16th century the cod fishery there was an important economic factor for the European colonial powers. At the time of issue, the battle over fishing rights was one of the central points of contention in the North American policy of France and England. With its depiction of the processing of freshly caught cod for shipment to Europe, Moll highlighted for subscribers and viewers the importance of this sector for his native England.

Moll labelled the Atlantic Ocean as the "Sea of the British Empire" and stressed the British claims to fishing rights off the coast of Newfoundland. In a West India map from the same series, he wrote in the southwestern corner of Carolina the words "Spanish Fort Deserted" and "Good Ground". On many of its North American maps – including on the Beaver Map – he drew particular attention to major ports streets, because he knew that was a sufficient infrastructure detail, communicating that for the further expansion of English power it was very important.

Pritchard argues that the Beaver Map was "one of the first and most important cartographic documents relating to the ongoing dispute between France and Great Britain over boundaries separating their respective American colonies ... The map was the primary exponent of the British position during the period immediately following the Treaty of Utrecht in 1713."

His maps were also used by other powers to attempt support for their claims. One of Moll's maps of the island of Newfoundland, published in the 1680s, showed Pointe Riche, the southern limit of the French Shore, to be situated at 47°40' North latitude. In 1763 the French attempted to use this map to establish their claim to the west coast of Newfoundland and Labrador, arguing that Point Riche and Cape Ray were the same headland. Governor Hugh Palliser and Captain James Cook found evidence to refute Moll's claim, and in 1764 the French accepted the placement of Pointe Riche near Port au Choix.

However, all political considerations aside, Moll's maps were in his lifetime and after probably quite popular given the high number that survive, and are still among the most sought-after aesthetic engravings in the history of cartography.

== Contemporaries ==
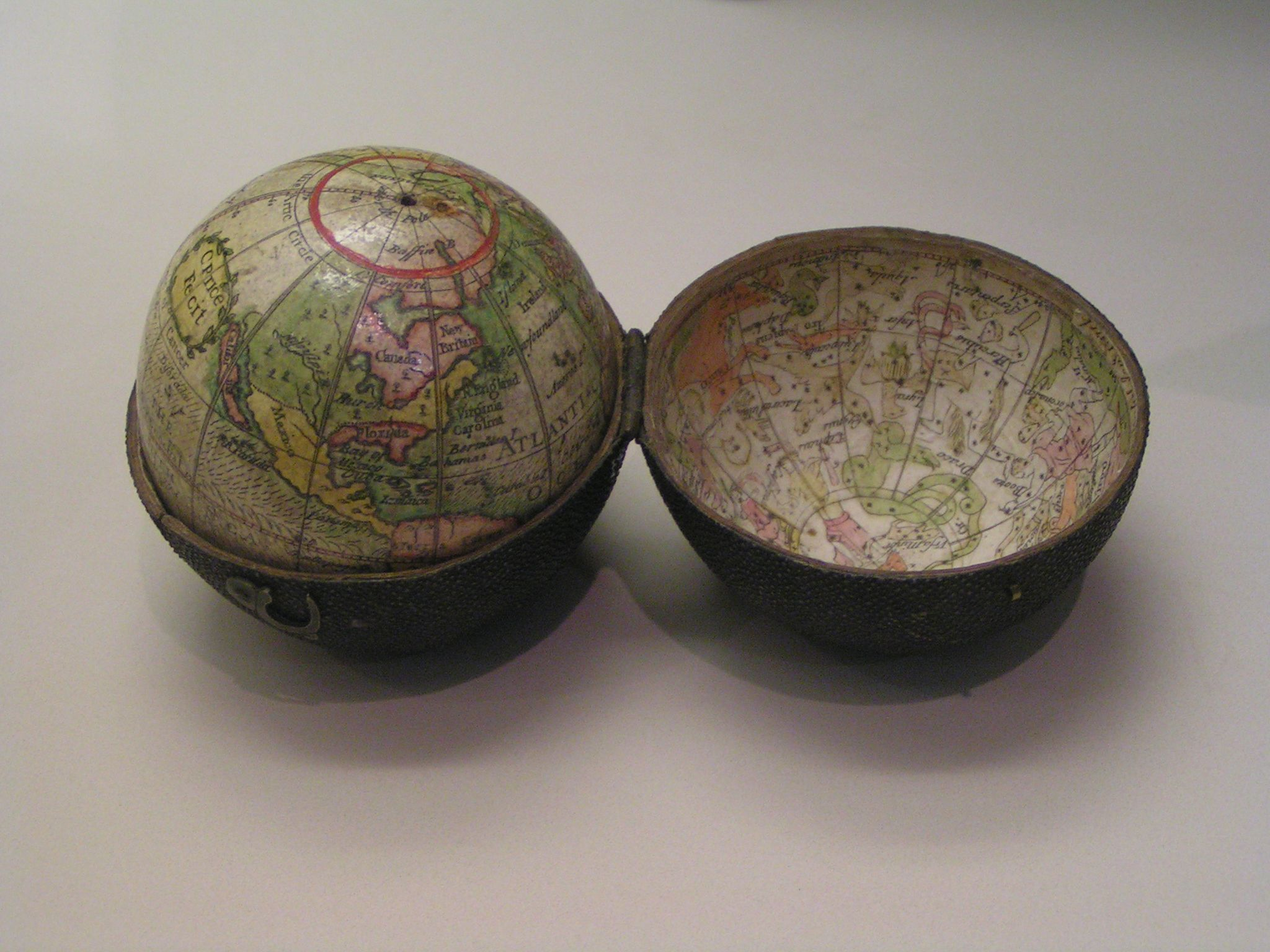
A pocket globe of the type issued by Moll, many of which showed the route of William Dampier's voyages

Moll worked for a number of notable people throughout his life, such as the polymath Robert Hooke, antiquary William Stukeley, and circumnavigator William Dampier. For the last, Moll engraved numerous maps for his best-selling accounts of his voyages around the world.

Moll's road maps of England and Scotland, at first published on their own, were added to editions of Daniel Defoe's A Tour Thro' the Whole Island of Great Britain. Another famous contemporary, Jonathan Swift, went so far as to include him in his Gulliver's Travels, having Lemuel Gulliver remark in chapter four, part eleven: "I arrived in seven hours to the south-east point of New Holland. This confirmed me in the opinion I have long entertained, that the maps and charts place this country at least three degrees more to the east than it really is; which I thought I communicated many years ago to my worthy friend, Mr. Herman Moll, and gave him my reasons for it, Although he has rather chosen to follow other authors."

However, apart from Stukeley and Hooke, there is no evidence that Moll himself was ever personally acquainted with any of the others.

== Death and legacy ==
Moll died on 22 September 1732, as noted in his obituary in The Gentleman's Magazine.

== Selected works ==
- Thesaurus Geographicus. A new body of geography: or a compleat description of the Earth Collected with great care from the most approv'd geographers and modern travellers and discoveries by several hands (1695)
- A System of Geography (1701)
- The Compleat Geographer (1709)
- The British empire in America (1708)
- A View of the Coasts, Countries, and Islands within the limits of the South Sea Company (1711)
- The World Described (1715)
- A Set of Fifty New and Correct Maps of England and Wales (1724)
- A Tour Thro' the Whole Island of Great Britain: Divided Into Circuits or Journies 4 volumes. (1761)

== Gallery ==
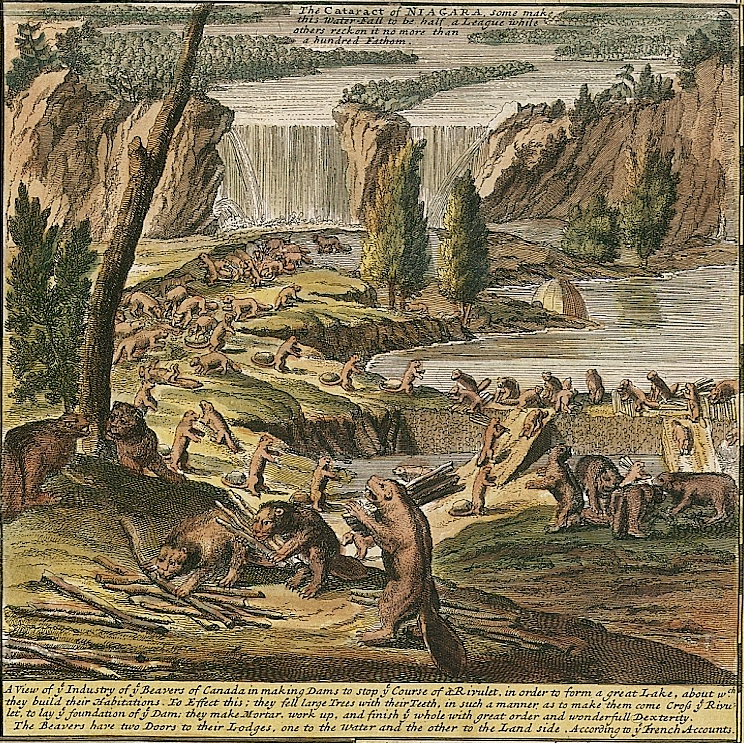
Inset of Moll's so-called Beaver Map from The World Described, a scene he copied from a map by Nicolas de Fer

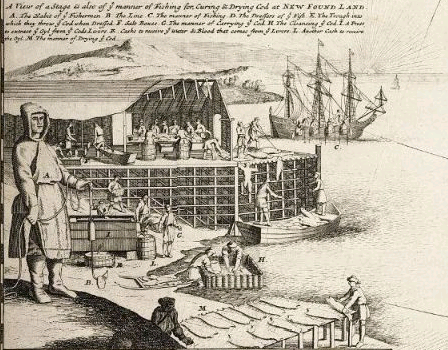
Inset of Moll's so-called Codfish Map from The World Described

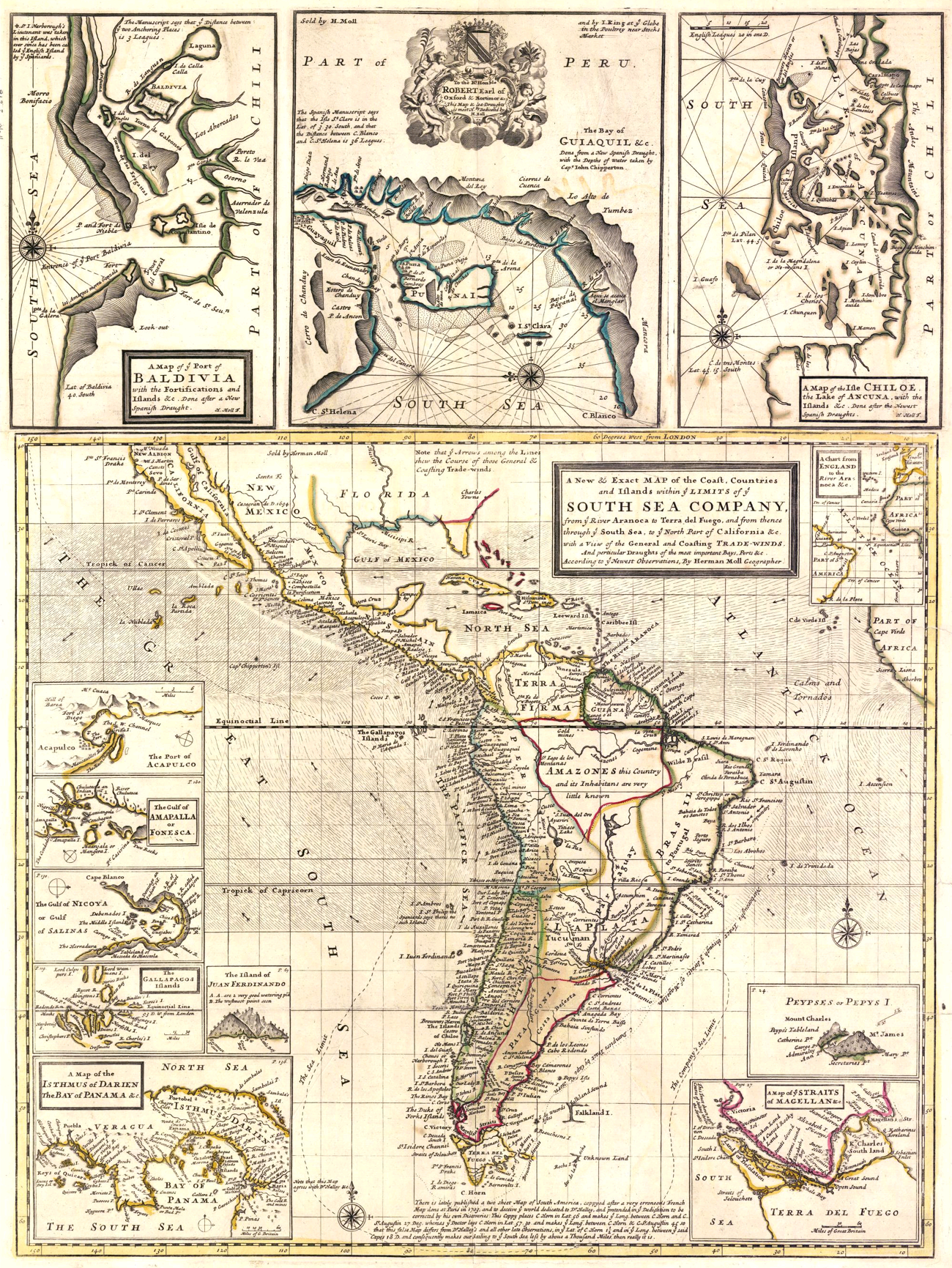
Moll's A New & Exact Map of the Coast, Countries and Islands within ye Limits of ye South Sea Company London 1711 (1720)

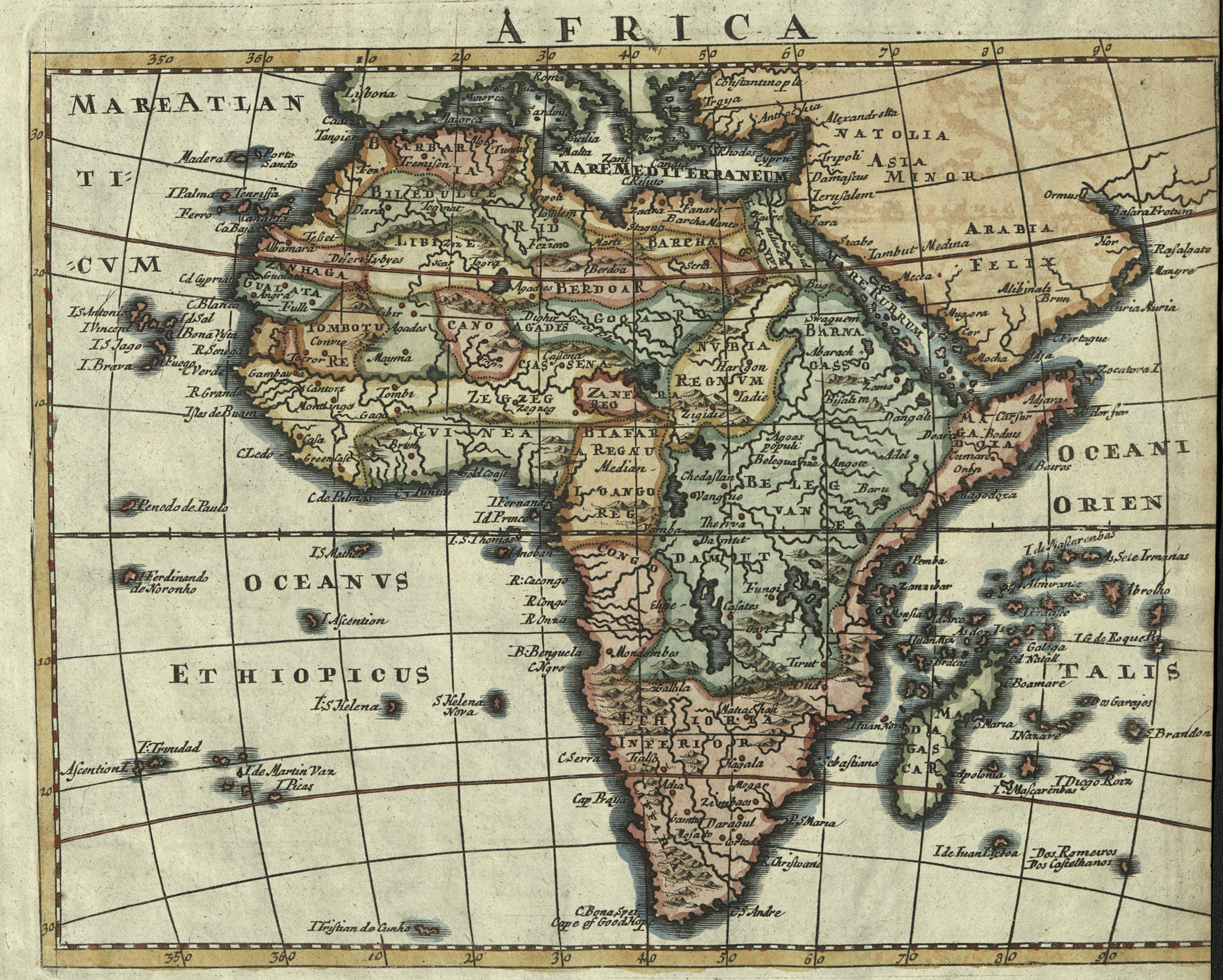
Moll's Africa, 1701

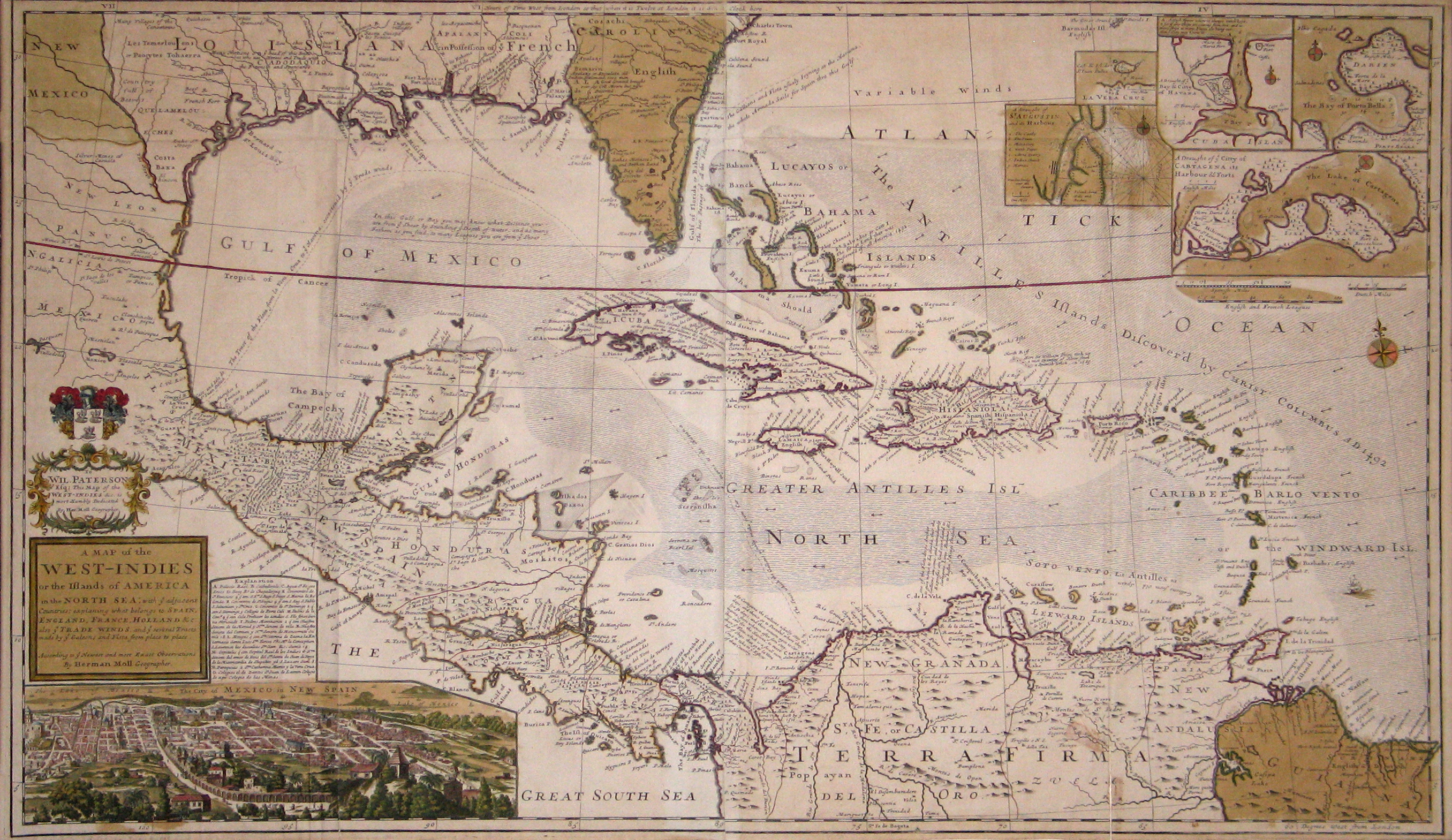
Moll's Map of the West-Indies or the Islands of America in the North Sea, c. 1715

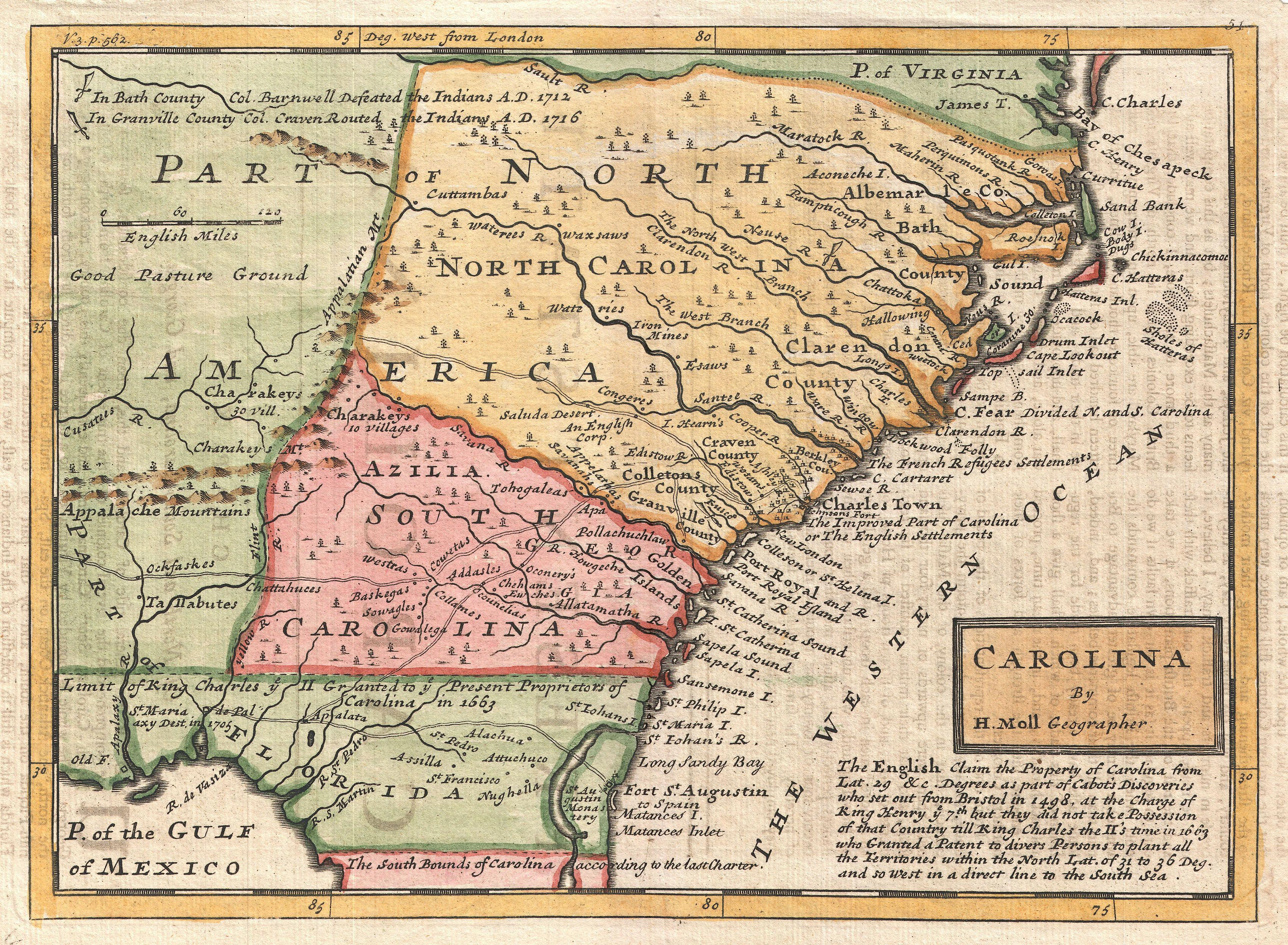
Province of Carolina showing the proposed, but not settled, Margravate of Azilia, 1746
