= List of shipwrecks in May 1826 =

The list of shipwrecks in May 1826 includes some ships sunk, foundered, grounded, or otherwise lost during May 1826.

== 2 May ==
List of shipwrecks: 2 May 1826
Ship	State	Description
Bon Voileur	Danzig	The ship was wrecked on the Haisborough Sands, in the North Sea off the coast of Norfolk, United Kingdom. She was on a voyage from Danzig to Dublin, United Kingdom. Bon Voileur later floated off; she was beached between Dunwich and Southwold, Suffolk, United Kingdom.

== 4 May ==
List of shipwrecks: 4 May 1826
Ship	State	Description
Vine	United Kingdom	The ship ran aground and was severely damaged in Strangford Lough.

== 7 May ==
List of shipwrecks: 7 May 1826
Ship	State	Description
Aimable Paulina	France	The ship sprang a leak and was abandoned in the Atlantic Ocean (38°30′N 31°00′W). She was on a voyage from St. Domingo to Fayal Island, Azores and Marseille, Bouches-du-Rhône.
Frau Maria	Hamburg	The ship foundered off Terschelling, Friesland, Netherlands. She was on a voyage from Kiel, Duchy of Holstein to Leith, Lothian, United Kingdom.
Regannot	United Kingdom	The brig was wrecked near Tromsø, Norway.
Weare Packet	United Kingdom	The ship was lost on the Shipwash Sand, in the North Sea off the coast of Essex. All on board were rescued. She was on a voyage from Sunderland, County Durham to London.

== 8 May ==
List of shipwrecks: 8 May 1826
Ship	State	Description
Anne	United Kingdom	The ship was wrecked on Cape Ray, Newfoundland, British North America. Her crew were rescued.
Canada	United Kingdom	The brig was wrecked on St. Paul's Island, Nova Scotia, British North America. Her crew were rescued. She was on a voyage from Belfast, County Antrim to Quebec City, Lower Canada, British North America.
Susannah	United Kingdom	The ship was abandoned in the Atlantic Ocean. She was on a voyage from Lisbon, Portugal to London.

== 9 May ==
List of shipwrecks: 9 May 1826
Ship	State	Description
Minerva	United Kingdom	The ship struck a sunken rock and sank off "Port Kelly". She was on a voyage from Belfast, County Antrim to Cork.
Vrow Helena	Netherlands	The ship was wrecked on Ameland, Friesland.

== 10 May ==
List of shipwrecks: 10 May 1826
Ship	State	Description
Elizabeth	Hamburg	The ship collided with Orinoco (United States) in the Elbe and was abandoned. Her crew were rescued by Orinoco. Elizabeth was on a voyage from Stockholm, Sweden to Hamburg. She was later taken in to Blankenese.

== 11 May ==
List of shipwrecks: 11 May 1826
Ship	State	Description
Favourite	United Kingdom	The ship was holed by an anchor and sank in the River Thames.

== 12 May ==
List of shipwrecks: 12 May 1826
Ship	State	Description
Nassau	United Kingdom	The ship was wrecked on Cape Sable Island, Nova Scotia, British North America. She was on a voyage from Ireland to Quebec City, Lower Canada, British North America.

== 13 May ==
List of shipwrecks: 13 May 1826
Ship	State	Description
HMS Barracouta	Royal Navy	The Cherokee-class brig-sloop was wrecked by a tornado in Algoa Bay.

== 15 May ==
List of shipwrecks: 15 May 1826
Ship	State	Description
Australia	(United Kingdom of Great Britain and Ireland) New South Wales	The ship was lost 70 nautical miles (130 km) north of Sydney. She was on a voyage from Batavia, Netherlands East Indies to Sydney. There were twelve survivors.

== 16 May ==
List of shipwrecks: 16 May 1826
Ship	State	Description
Venus	United Kingdom	The ship struck The Manacles, Cornwall and foundered. Her crew were rescued. She was on a voyage from Plymouth, Devon to Newport, Monmouthshire.

== 17 May ==
List of shipwrecks: 17 May 1826
Ship	State	Description
Nordstern	Rostock	The ship was abandoned off Rostock. She was on a voyage from "Niestadt" to Rostock.

== 18 May ==
List of shipwrecks: 18 May 1826
Ship	State	Description
Usk	United Kingdom	The brig was driven ashore at the mouth of the Breede River, Africa. She was later refloated.

== 19 May ==
List of shipwrecks: 19 May 1826
Ship	State	Description
Courier d'Haiti	France	The ship struck a rock at Cayenne and was wrecked.

== 22 May ==
List of shipwrecks: 22 May 1826
Ship	State	Description
Philippine	France	The ship was wrecked at Senegal.

== 24 May ==
List of shipwrecks: 24 May 1826
Ship	State	Description
Horatio	United Kingdom	The ship was wrecked on Prince Edward Island, British North America. Her crew were rescued. She was on a voyage from Hull, Yorkshire to Quebec City, Lower Canada, British North America.

== 26 May ==
List of shipwrecks: 26 May 1826
Ship	State	Description
Vine	United Kingdom	The ship struck the Crow Rock, in the Irish Sea off the coast of Pembrokeshire and sank. Her crew were rescued by Felicity (United Kingdom). Vine was on a voyage from Swansea, Glamorgan to Drogheda, County Louth.

== 28 May ==
List of shipwrecks: 28 May 1826
Ship	State	Description
Busiris	United Kingdom	The ship was wrecked on the Cobbler's Rocks, Barbados, Her crew were rescued.

== 29 May ==
List of shipwrecks: 29 May 1826
Ship	State	Description
Bruce	Hamburg	The ship was wrecked on the Long Sand, in the North Sea off the coast of Kent, United Kingdom. Her crew were rescued. She was on a voyage from Brazil to Hamburg.
Dido	Netherlands	The ship was driven ashore on Goeree, Zeeland. She was on a voyage from Cette, Hérault, France to Rotterdam, South Holland.
General Brock	(United Kingdom of Great Britain and Ireland) Jersey	The ship was run down and sunk in the Atlantic Ocean (47°50′N 48°30′W) with the ultimate loss of fourteen of her eighteen crew. She was on a voyage from Jersey to Gaspé, Lower Canada, British North America.
Good Intent	United Kingdom	The smack struck a rock and foundered in the North Sea north of Bergen, Norway. Her crew were rescued.
Wilhelmina	Bremen	The ship was lost on the Cross Sand, in the North Sea off the coast of Kent. Her crew were rescued. She was on a voyage from Bremen tt St. Thomas, Virgin Islands.

== 30 May ==
List of shipwrecks: 30 May 1826
Ship	State	Description
Success	United Kingdom	The ship ran aground on St. George's Bank and foundered. Her crew were rescued. She was on a voyage from Portsmouth, Hampshire, to Port-au-Prince, Haiti.

== 31 May ==
List of shipwrecks: 31 May 1826
Ship	State	Description
Marli	(United Kingdom of Great Britain and Ireland) Grenada	The drogher was wrecked in Sautlens Bay.

== Unknown date ==
List of shipwrecks: Unknown date in May 1826
Ship	State	Description
Agenora	United Kingdom	The ship ran aground on the Dragor Reef. She was on a voyage from Pillau, Prussia to London. Agenora was later refloated and put into Copenhagen, Denmark for repairs.
Belle Julie	France	The whaler was lost in ice off Newfoundland, British North America with much loss of life. She was on a voyage from Granville, Manche to Newfoundland.
Caroline	United Kingdom	The ship was abandoned in the Atlantic Ocean off the coast of Nova Scotia, British North America. She was on a voyage from Quebec City, Lower Canada, British North America to Cork. Caroline was later taken in to Richibucto, New Brunswick, British North America.
Gurnet	(United Kingdom of Great Britain and Ireland) New South Wales	The ship was driven ashore and wrecked north of Sydney with the loss of all four crewe.
Nathalie	France	The whaler was lost in ice off Newfoundland with much loss of life. She was on a voyage from Granville to Newfoundland
Storkedder	Denmark	The ship capsized in the North Sea before 25 May. She was towed in to Peterhead, Aberdeenshire, United Kingdom bottom up.
Stranger	United Kingdom	The ship ran aground on the Dragor Reef. She was on a voyage from Riga, Russia to Plymouth, Devon. She was later refloated and put into Helsingør, Denmark.
Sun	United Kingdom	The brig was wrecked in the Torres Strait with the loss of 24 of the 36 people on board.
