= Point Riche =

Cape in Newfoundland and Labrador, Canada

Coordinates: 50°41′50.72″N 57°24′34.56″W

Location of Point Riche in Newfoundland

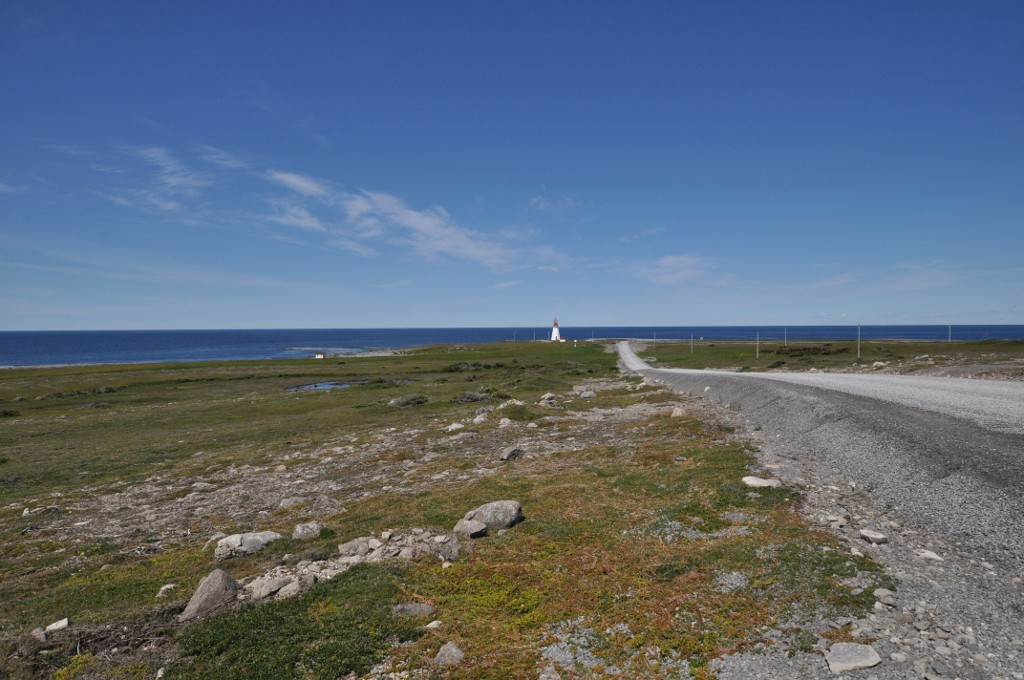
Port au Choix National Historic Site of Canada. Dorset archeological site with Pointe Riche light in background.

The Headland of Point Riche is located near the community of Port au Choix on the Great Northern Peninsula of the island of Newfoundland in the Canadian province of Newfoundland and Labrador.

Point Riche to Cape Bonavista was the northernmost defining point on the Newfoundland coastline, where the French could fish around the coast of Newfoundland, an area called the French Shore. The French fishing rights were first defined in the Treaty of Utrecht in 1713. This area had been frequented by fishermen from Brittany since the early 16th century. In the 1783 Treaty of Versailles, the boundary points of the French Shore were changed to Cape St. John and Cape Ray. In 1904, the French relinquished all their rights to the French Shore, as part of the Entente Cordiale.

The point is marked by the Point Riche Lighthouse, a wooden lighthouse which was constructed in 1871 and replaced with stone lighthouse in 1892.
