= French Shore =

Historical fishing area

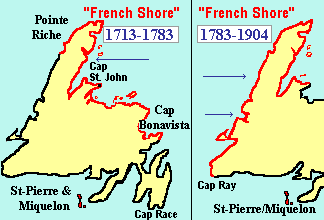
The French Shore

The French Shore (French: Côte française de Terre-Neuve), also called The Treaty Shore, resulted from the 1713 ratifications of the Treaty of Utrecht. The provisions of the treaty allowed the French to fish in season along the north coast of Newfoundland between Cape Bonavista and Point Riche. This area had been frequented by fishermen from Brittany since the early 16th century, which they called "le petit nord" (the little North).

In the 1783 Treaty of Versailles, the boundary points of the French Shore were changed to Cape St. John and Cape Ray, as shown in the accompanying map, with France being granted exclusive rights.

In 1904, as a result of the Entente Cordiale, the French relinquished their rights on the French Shore against territorial changes in Africa.

The history of the French Shore is depicted on the French Shore Tapestry, finished in 2010 and now on display in Conche, Newfoundland. It measures 67.4 metres (221 ft) in length.
