= Abeona (ship) =

Several vessels have been named Abeona for one of the Roman birth and childhood deities.

- Abeona (1811 ship) was launched at Newcastle upon Tyne. A fire at sea destroyed her in November 1820, killing many passengers and crew.
- Abeona, of 382 tons (bm), was built in 1814 by William Leslie at Newcastle upon Tyne. She was wrecked on 22 April 1843 off Cape San Antonio, Cuba. Her crew were rescued. She was on a voyage from Newcastle upon Tyne to New Orleans, Louisiana.
- Abeona, of 1,004 GRT, was a three-masted iron sailing vessel built by Alexander Stephen and Sons, Kelvinhaugh. In 1894 she was converted to a barque. She wrecked on 4 September 1900 on Thunderbolt Reef, Cape Recife, while sailing from Barry for Algoa Bay.

== See also ==
- USS Abeona
