= Cape St. John =

Headland on Newfoundland, Canada

Coordinates: 50°00′00″N 55°30′38″W

Location of Cape St. John in Newfoundland

Cape St. John is a headland located on the north coast of Newfoundland in the Canadian province of Newfoundland and Labrador.

Cape St. John forms the northeastern point of the Baie Verte Peninsula and has a high prominent peak with steep cliffs rising to an elevation of 74m that are reddish in colour. The nearest community to Cape St. John is La Scie.

The Treaties of Versailles (1783) ended the French fishing rights between Cape Bonavista and Pointe Riche and a new one was drawn up that included the coastal areas from Cape St. John to Cape Ray. In 1894, the coast between these two capes was divided into eight districts with a fishery warden appointed to each district. In 1904 with the signing of the Entente Cordiale the land and territorial waters of the French Shore was ceded back to the government of Newfoundland.

In 1867, Queen of Swansea ran ashore on Gull Island and in 1884 the Newfoundland government built the Gull Island-Cape St. John lighthouse on the highest point of land on Gull Island.
