= Gerard Brantsen =

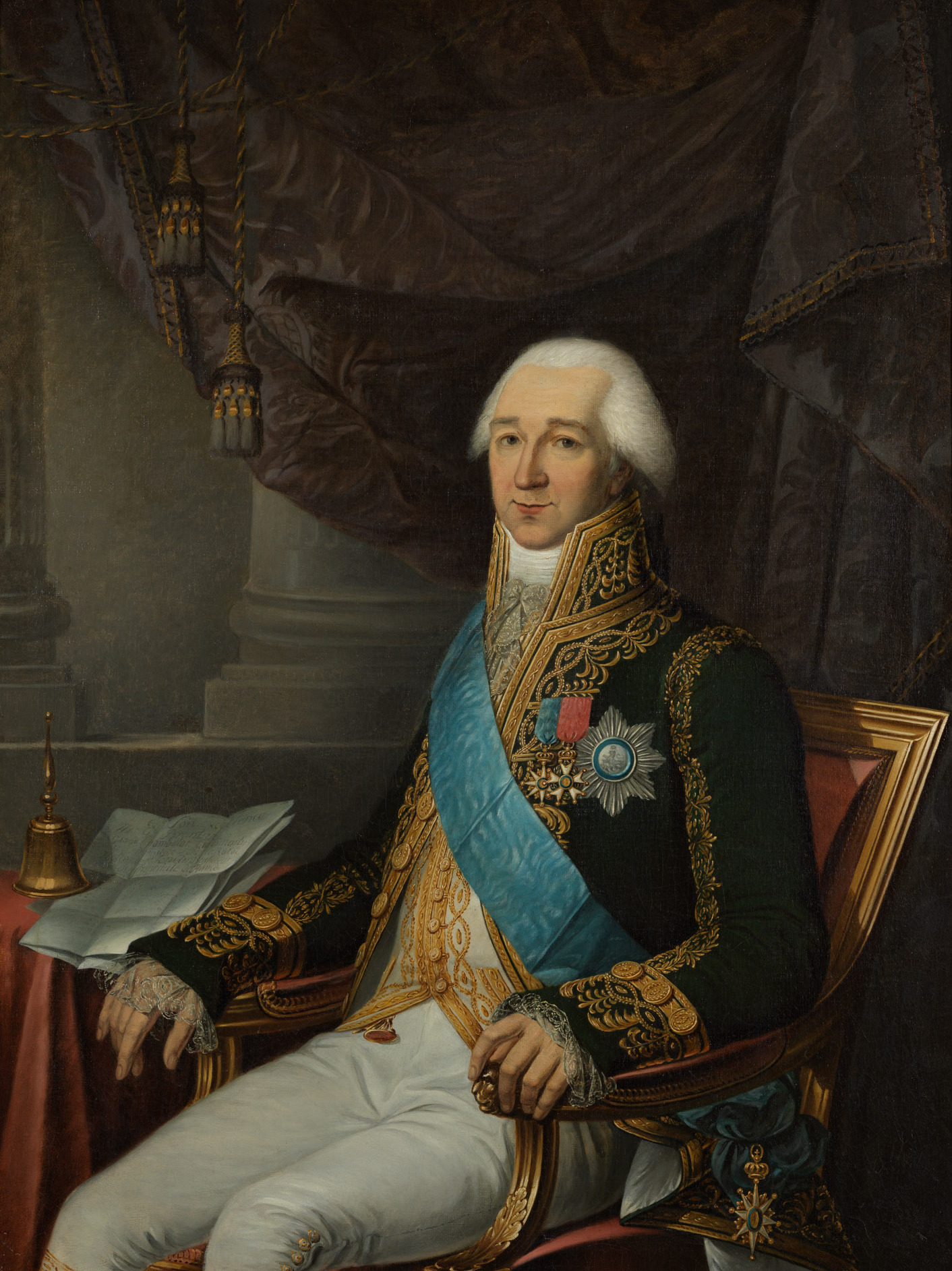
1803 portrait of Brantsen by Benjamin Wolff

Gerard Brantsen (10 January 1735 – 21 December 1809) was a Dutch politician and diplomat. He was one of the Dutch signatories to the treaty ending the Fourth Anglo-Dutch War in 1784. He was also mayor of Arnhem in 1762 and 1765, and several times an alderman of this city. He was a member of the Staatsbewind of the Batavian Republic between 16 October 1801 and 29 April 1805 (president between 1 May 1804 and 31 July 1804).

== Personal life ==
Brantsen was born the son of Johan Brantsen and Hester Henrietta de Vree. His father was receiver-general of the Veluwe quarter of Gelderland. Both his grandfathers were burgemeesters of Arnhem.

Brantsen studied law at Leiden University where he received his law degree on 10 September 1755 with a dissertation entitled De mutuis inter diversas atque vicinas gentes officiorum humanitatis atque comitatispraestationibus.

He remained unmarried but fathered two sons. (Note: The two sons were "recognized" as "friends" in Brantsen's last will. The first, Frederick, was a son of Louise Reine d'Hautavoine, called Deligny. In the will he was given the pseudonym Frederik du Val de St. Marie, but Brantsen's biographer Koene found out that he used his father's name in real life as Charles Louis Frederic Brantzen. The other son was named Louis Bellerive in the will. He was a son of the widow Dorival. Both were bequeathed the equivalent of 4,000 guilders, but the executor of the will apparently did not take the trouble of finding them after Brantsen's death; Cf. Koene, pp. 381-382)

== Career ==
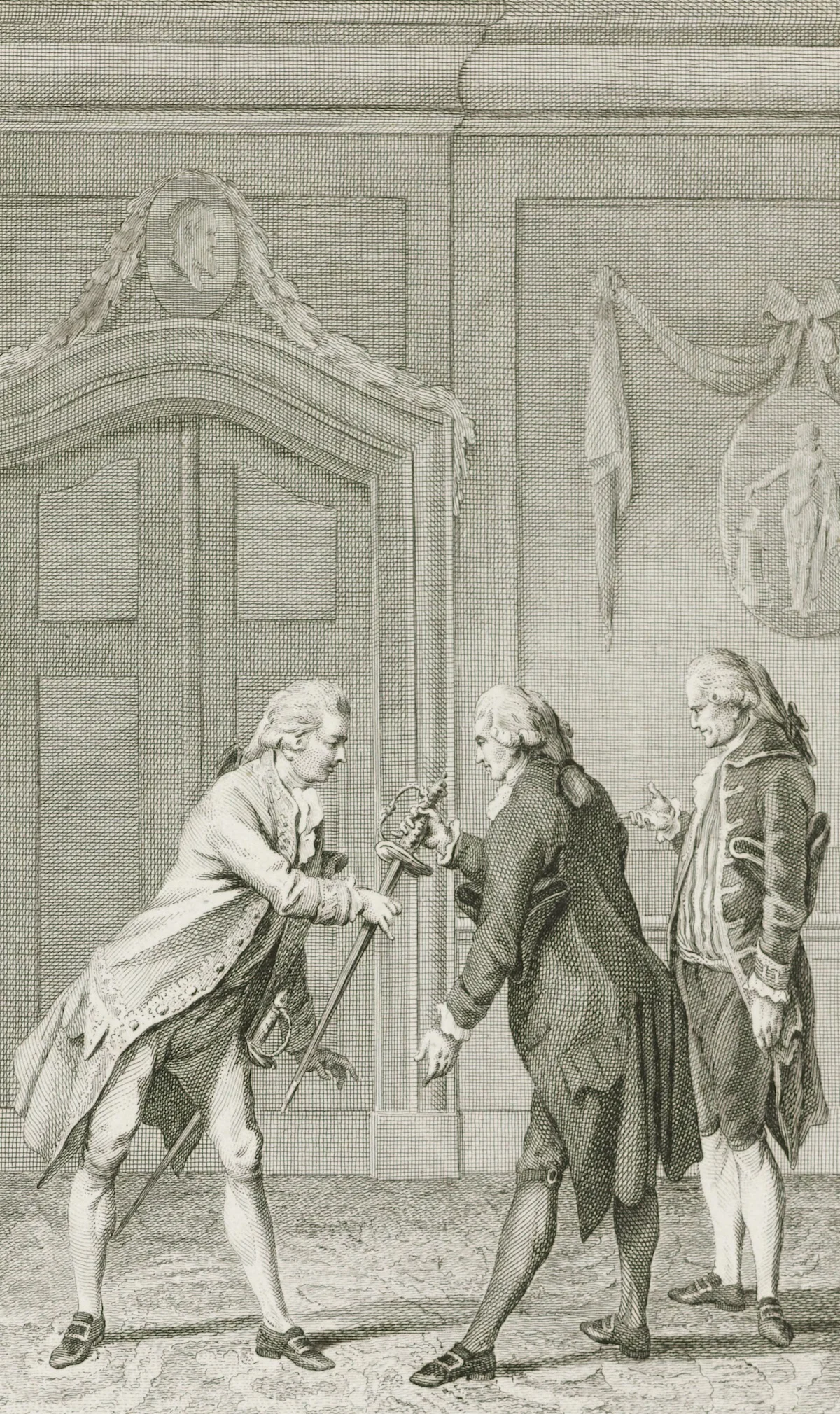
Mattheus Lestevenon and Brantsen presenting Pierre André de Suffren with a golden sword in 1784

Brantsen started his political career on 6 May 1760 when he was co-opted in the Arnhem vroedschap. He remained a member until 25 January 1788. He was several times a schepen of the city, and also a burgemeester. In 1764 he was for the first time sent to the regional council for the Veluwe Quarter, representing Arnhem. On 8 June 1764 he was made a member of the Gelderland delegation in the States General of the Dutch Republic, which he remained until 1782.

On 15 August 1782 he was sent by the States-General to the peace negotiations between the participants in the American Revolutionary War in Fontainebleau as an Envoy Extraordinary and Minister Plenipotentiary (together with ambassador Mattheus Lestevenon) for the Republic to negotiate the 1784 treaty that ended the Fourth Anglo-Dutch War (to which he was a signatory). While in France they negotiated the Treaty of Fontainebleau (1785) with Holy Roman Emperor Joseph II which maintained the continued closure of the Scheldt, in exchange for certain concessions from the Republic. In 1787 he was recalled, (Note: Brantsen's family was "Orangist", but he himself was a moderate Patriot. Because of his posting abroad he was not directly involved in the political upheavals of the Patriot revolution of 1785 and its suppression by Anglo-Prussian intervention in 1787, but his political sympathies were known, which made him highly "suspect" in Orangist circles, even though the Patriots, according to Van der Aa, also suspected him of "double dealing" (cf. Van der Aa, p. 1199). Brantsen's Patriot sponsors, like Grand Pensionary Pieter van Bleiswijk were sacked by the new regime, so it was no surprise to Brantsen that he himself would also lose his position in the purge. He was formally recalled by the States-General on 10 October 1787, but it took a while before he attended his final audiences at the French court (where he received a portrait of the French king Louis XVI, inlaid with brilliants), so he only arrived in The Hague in early 1788. The States-General treated him leniently: he was thanked politely for his services, and allowed to retain the portrait of the king. But he lost his place in the Gelderland delegation in the States-General to an Orangist; cf. Koene, pp. 183-194.) but remained as a private citizen in France until 1792 (Rue Neuve des Mathurins). In 1794 he acted ( together with Ocker Repelaer van Driel) as envoy to the French Republic to attempt to conclude a separate peace in the War of the First Coalition between the Dutch and French Republics, but the collapse of the Dutch defense prevented this from coming to fruition.

After the Batavian Revolution of 1795 he remained a private citizen again until he was elected a member of the new Staatsbewind of the Batavian Republic in October 1801. He was a member of the commission for the Interior of the Staatsbewind, and between 1 May and 31 July 1804 President of the Staatsbewind.

In May 1805 (after the Staatsbewind had been replaced by Grand Pensionary Rutger Jan Schimmelpenninck) he was again appointed envoy extraordinary to France where he helped negotiate the transfer of the Batavian Republic to the Kingdom of Holland. He was Grand Master of Ceremonies for king Louis from 4 July 1806, which he remained until January 1808. He was Grand Master and chamberlain extraordinary of the king from September 1808 until 21 December 1809.

In July 1804 Brantsen was made Grand Aigle of the Legion of Honour by emperor Napoleon I. He received the Grandcross of the Order of the Union on 16 February 1807 from king Louis.

Brantsen died on 21 December 1809 in his birthplace Arnhem. He was buried in the Grote Kerk in Arnhem on 27 December 1809.
