= Daniel Hailes =

British diplomat

Daniel Hailes (c. 1751–1835) was a British diplomat. He was the British signatory to the Anglo-Dutch treaty ending the Fourth Anglo-Dutch War in 1783, before serving as a secretary to British embassy in France in 1784–1787, envoy to Poland in 1788–1791, envoy extraordinary to Denmark from 1791, envoy extraordinary to Sweden from 1795. He retired from diplomatic service in 1801.

== Life ==
During his mission in Warsaw, he followed a policy of Anglo-Prussian understanding at Loo in 1788, seeking to form the Polish Republic, Turkey and Sweden into an alliance against Russia and Austria and backing the reforms of the Great Sejm and the idea of giving Danzig to Prussia.

Heavily opposed to the French Revolution, he zealously attempted to calm Denmark's revolutionary leanings during his ambassadorial time there. After the 1794 fire at the Christiansborg Palace, the Danish poet Peter Andreas Heiberg wrote an article which he published in his friend Knud Lyne Rahbek's journal Den Danske Tilskuer (The Danish Spectator) under the pseudonym Simon Sanddrue on 17 March that year. He states that he was an eyewitness to the fire and that, though most of the bystanders did their best to save the palace's contents, "two foreigners" stood at a distance watching the blaze. One of these foreigners described as a tall gentleman with a jacket and monocle who said in a broken but triumphant voice "Had the stupid Danish government spent only half the amount that is lost here tonight in sending a fleet against France, it could have won the war in three years, benefited its own and Europe's cause and still covered its losses". Heiberg added that, due to this audacity, he intended to add this man to his proposed publication of a Rogues' gallery, known in Danish as the Billedgalleri over adelige og uadelige Skurke og Skurkinder.

The article mentioned no names, but no one in Copenhagen was in doubt that the monocled man was Hailes, who became angry and took Rahbek to court. However, in court Rahbek stated that he did not know who had written the article and that he had had no part in its writing, with the case thus ending in an acquittal. This result showed the Danish government's inability to control the press and thus further angered Hailes, who refused to meet the Danish foreign minister Andreas Peter Bernstorff for seven weeks after the trial - a serious problem, since Anglo-Danish relations were at this time strained to breaking point due to Denmark's neutrality in the French Revolutionary Wars. Bernstorff was at this time negotiating the release or ransom of several Danish ships seized by Britain on accusations of carrying contraband (Denmark had continued to trade with both Britain and France during the wars), but after the trial Hailes protested that "as long as the English government emissary is being insulted in Copenhagen, no one in London can think of releasing the Danish ships". That sentiment was probably instrumental in the poet Heiberg being fined 300 rigsdaler later in 1794 for insulting King George III in his play Vor klub er dog en herlig sag (Our club is a wonderful case)
