= Chesterfield (1806 ship) =

History

United Kingdom
- Name: Chesterfield
- Launched: 1806, Portland
- Captured: 29 October 1811; later recaptured

France
- Name: L'Aigle
- Acquired: October 1812 by capture
- Captured: 10 May 1812

General characteristics
- Tons burthen: 85 (bm)
- Length: 58 ft 4 in (17.8 m)
- Beam: 18 ft 11 in (5.8 m).

Chesterfield was launched in 1806 at Portland. She served from November 1806 to her capture in October 1811, as a Post Office Packet Service packet, sailing between Weymouth and the Channel Islands. A French privateer captured her at the end of October 1811 in "a spirited but ineffectual" single ship action. She then became a French privateer that made several captures before the Royal Navy recaptured her.

== Career ==
Captain Starr Wood took command of Chesterfield. (Note: Starr Wood was the son of Captain James Wood, who had been master of Earl of Chesterfield, which had just been sold at Weymouth.) From November 1806 to her capture in October 1811, she sailed between Weymouth and the Channel Islands.

On 17 June 1810, Chesterfield rescued five boys who were in a small boat that was drifting towards the rocks off Guernsey. The boys had sailed to Herm. When they set out to return their boat was unable to handle the currents, which were carrying them towards rocks.

At about 11a.m. on 12 January 1811, Chesterfield sailed from Guernsey, bound for Weymouth. At about 6p.m. she encountered a French privateer that was cruising between Guernsey and Jersey. At 8:30 the privateer, which had 14 guns and a large complement, came within 50 yards. Wood fired a broadside, at which the privateer sheered off. (Note: The lugger may have been San Joseph, of 14 guns and 68 men. She was captured in October 1812.)

Capture: Lloyd's List reported that a French privateer lugger had captured Earl of Chesterfield off Alderney as Earl of Chesterfield was sailing to Guernsey. Other reports give the vessel's name as Chesterfield. The privateer was Epruvier (Epervier), of 14 guns and 50 men, sailing out of Cherbourg. (Note: Épervier was probably the privateer commissioned at Dieppe in 1810 under Captain Bonamy. She was then sold and made another cruise in February with 55 men and 16 guns.)

Wood succeeded in sinking Chesterfield's mails and dispatches before she was captured. In the engagement, one passenger was killed and several of her crew were wounded. The Post Office paid Wood £1,626 in compensation. He used the money to purchase another vessel, which he named Chesterfield. (Note: One passenger, a captain sailing to join his regiment in Jersey, died in Cherbourg. Two seamen may also have died there.)

== French privateer ==
Chesterfield became the Cherbourg privateer L'Aigle. She was commissioned in 1811. She was armed with 14 guns and had a crew of 61 men under the command of Captain Alexandre William Black.

In 1812, L'Aigle, Captain Black, captured the ships Beaver and Pivert. Beaver, Beveridge, master, had been sailing from Mogador to London when she was captured on 1 March. She arrived on 4 March at Cherbourg. French sources report that the English vessel Peavert, of 130 tons (bm), arrived in Cherbourg in March. She was carrying a cargo of leather and sweet almonds.

On 1 May L'Aigle captured Eliza, Cole, for the second time. The schooner Arrow later drove Eliza ashore on the French coast, where she was destroyed.

On 7 May 1812, L'Aigle sailed from Bennodet, near Quimper.

On 10 May 1812 HMS Sybille captured Aigle at 49°6′N 8°22′W. Aigle had thrown eight of her 14 guns overboard while trying to escape Sybille. Aigle was three days out of Bennodet, near Quimper, and had earlier captured the brig Alicia Hill as Alicia was sailing from Bristol to Gibraltar.Aigle had captured Alicia Hill, Le Brun, master, at 48°26′N 9°58′W. (Note: HMS Rota recaptured Alicia Hill, which arrived on 19 July at Plymouth.) Aigle arrived at Cork on 15 July.
