= Peace of Paris (1783) =

Set of treaties that ended the American Revolutionary War

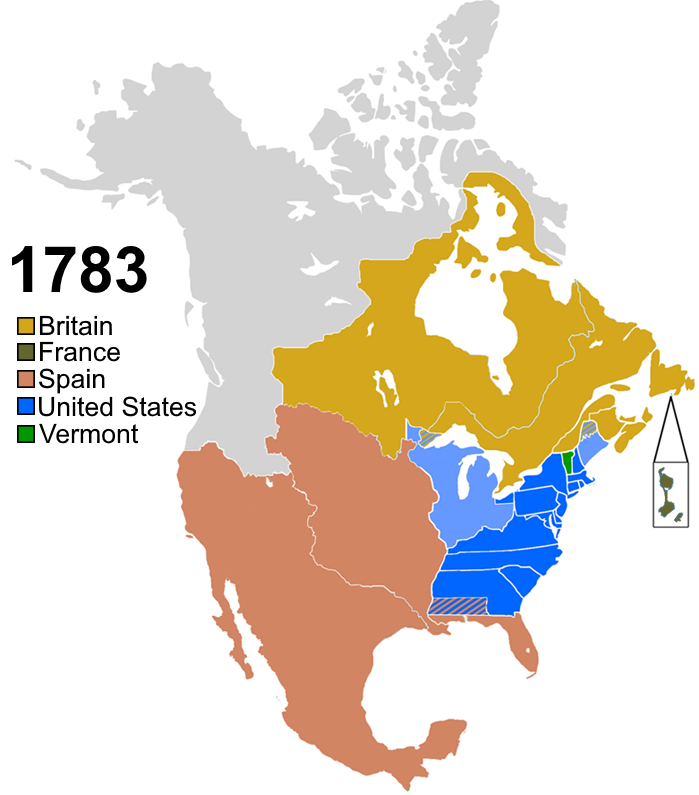
- Map of North America after the Peace of Paris of 1783 (Vermont was independent until 1788)
- Type: Bilateral; Treaty of Peace
- Signed: 3 September 1783
- Location: Paris, France
- Effective: 25 November 1783
- Condition: Ratification by Great Britain with France – the United Provinces will only be signed in 1784
- Signatories: Duke of Manchester; Daniel Hailes; Vergennes; Count of Aranda; Mattheus Lestevenon; Gerard Brantsen
- Parties: Great Britain; France; Spain; United Provinces; United States
- Ratifiers: France; Great Britain; Spain; United Provinces; United States
- Languages: English; French; Spanish; Dutch

The Peace of Paris of 1783 was the set of treaties that ended the American Revolutionary War. On 3 September 1783, representatives of King George III of Great Britain signed a treaty in Paris with representatives of the United States of America—commonly known as the Treaty of Paris (1783)—and two treaties at Versailles with representatives of King Louis XVI of France and King Charles III of Spain—commonly known as the Treaties of Versailles (1783). The previous day, a preliminary treaty had been signed with representatives of the States General of the Dutch Republic, but the final treaty which ended the Fourth Anglo-Dutch War was not signed until 20 May 1784; for convenience, however, it is included in the summaries below.

The treaty dictated that Great Britain would recognize the independence and sovereignty of the United States of America, formerly their Thirteen Colonies on the Eastern seaboard of North America. The treaty marked the end of the First British Empire. The United States gained more than it expected, thanks to the award of western territory. France got its revenge over Britain after its defeat in the Seven Years' War and gained Tobago and Senegal but ended up financially exhausted. It was already in financial trouble and its borrowing to pay for the war used up all its credit and created the financial disasters that marked the 1780s, and some historians link those disasters to the coming of the French Revolution. The Spanish regained Minorca, West Florida and East Florida from Britain, but not Gibraltar. The Dutch did not gain anything of significant value at the end of the war.

== Path to negotiation ==
News of the surrender of Lieutenant General Charles Cornwallis at Yorktown to a joint Franco-American army reached Britain late in November 1781, shortly before Parliament was due to debate the military spending estimates for the following year. The hastily revised plan was that forces in America were to be retained at their existing level, but the policy of "offensive" war and long campaigns far away from well-supplied strongholds (which had also led to the Saratoga defeat four years earlier) was to be abandoned in favor of a new approach, details of which had to remain secret. The budget was passed by a large majority, but a few days later news was received that the British fleet in the Bay of Biscay had been able to capture only a fraction of a very large French fleet, carrying troops for invasions of British colonies around the world. Parliament immediately ordered an inquiry into the administration of the Royal Navy, to be held after the Christmas recess. At the beginning of January, it was learned that French forces had begun capturing small British-held islands in the West Indies even without the help of the new fleet (which had been driven back to France by storms), so a large British fleet was sent westwards as soon as possible. Also in that month, the government appointed a new commander for the American forces, Lieutenant General Guy Carleton who had defeated the American invasion of Canada in the early phase of the war, and the Colonial Secretary, Lord Germain, was replaced by the hawkish Welbore Ellis.

The inquiry into Navy administration was followed by a parliamentary vote on 20 February in which the First Lord of the Admiralty, Lord Sandwich, narrowly escaped dismissal. The following week, Parliament voted for a guarantee of the "no offensive war" claim made the previous autumn, on the grounds that increased military commitment to America would, among other things, be "the means of weakening the efforts of this country against her European enemies". On 27 February 1782, the House voted against further war in America, by 19 votes. At the beginning of March, news arrived which absolutely confirmed the wisdom of this position – the loss of two more West Indian islands in January (with a third seemingly at the mercy of the French Navy), and of the Mediterranean base on Menorca in February. The opposition in Parliament then began tabling motions alleging that Great Britain had no confidence in its government; the first of these was rejected by just 10 votes, another a week later by 9 votes. Hours before yet another such vote was due, on 20 March, the government leader, Lord North, persuaded King George III to accept his resignation (this set a precedent that successful Parliamentary votes of "no confidence" would automatically force a prime minister to resign). The king's choice as replacement, Lord Shelburne (who, though an old friend of Benjamin Franklin, had initially stated in February that he "would never consent, under any possible given circumstances, to acknowledge the independency of America") refused the post, leading to the formation of a strange new government team, nominally led by Lord Rockingham, whom the King hated, with Shelburne and Charles James Fox, who hated each other, as Secretaries of State.

== Negotiation process ==
=== Ground rules ===
Rockingham's team recognised that their priority was to get Britain out of its four linked wars, and that time might be short—within days of his appointment, news came from the West Indies that three more British islands had been captured by the French. Therefore, the decision was made to build on the "no offensive war" policy and begin peace talks with the Americans. Three factors made this the logical approach: first, the stated aim of the 1778 Treaty of Alliance between the United States and France was specifically to maintain the independence of the United States. Second, for well over a year, informal discussions had been held with Henry Laurens, an American envoy captured on his way to Amsterdam. On 31 December 1781 Laurens had been released on parole, and now he was offered the chance to help begin negotiations. Third, on hearing of Lord North's resignation, Benjamin Franklin immediately wrote from Paris, making it clear that the Americans were ready to begin talking. However, Laurens, Franklin, and John Adams (then representing America in the Dutch Republic) all made it clear to the British that America could not, under the 1778 alliance treaty, make peace without French agreement. What none of them knew was that France, under its completely separate treaty of alliance with Spain, could not make peace without Spanish agreement; indeed, not without a guarantee that the British stronghold of Gibraltar, commanding the narrow entrance to the Mediterranean Sea from the Atlantic Ocean, would be handed over to Spain. Spanish and French forces had been besieging Gibraltar for nearly three years without success, so it was likely that they would have to negotiate with Britain to exchange it for some other territory, perhaps some of the captured West Indian islands. For Britain that would be a tough decision—although the West Indies produced vast profits, holding Gibraltar allowed unhindered sea trade with all the Mediterranean countries.

The British government decided to resist accepting American independence as a precondition for negotiation, as they were aware that the French government was nearly bankrupt, and that the British reinforcements sent to the West Indies might well reverse the situation there at any moment (the fleet was commanded by Admiral Rodney, who had returned to England from the Caribbean on sick-leave just before the French fleet there sailed north to blockade Yorktown; he also faced numerous expensive lawsuits over his looting of the Caribbean island of St. Eustatius—in short, a glorious victory was his only option). The British negotiator sent to Paris was Richard Oswald, an old slave-trading partner of Henry Laurens, who had been one of his visitors in the Tower of London. His first talks with Franklin led to a proposal that Britain should hand over Canada to the Americans. On 23 April, Lord Shelburne, without specifically referring to the terms of that proposal, which he kept a secret from nearly all his colleagues, replied with an offer to accept full American independence, but on the existing borders. A second British envoy, Thomas Grenville (unaware of the Canada suggestion), was now sent to begin talks with the French government, based on this proposal. He indicated that the French could help to secure American independence, their avowed reason for entering the war back in 1778, by offering to return the British possessions they had captured in the West Indies, but the French rejected this, and separated their own peace demands from America's. That did indeed violate the spirit of their 1778 treaty of alliance with America, and fundamentally affected the future of the negotiations. Another factor which gave added power to the Americans was the decision on 19 April of the Dutch Republic (otherwise known as the United Provinces of the Netherlands, its 200-year-old federal government structure being a model from which the United States would learn) to recognise John Adams as the ambassador of an independent country. This led swiftly to the offer of a much-needed loan from the Netherlands, following which Adams went to Paris to join the impending peace negotiations.

=== British government changes again ===
On 18 May, the decision to keep full independence as a point for negotiation was vindicated by the arrival in Europe of news that, over a month previously, Admiral George Rodney had gained a significant naval victory over the French in the Caribbean saving Jamaica from a Franco-Spanish invasion. It was also learned that the French Admiral Comte de Grasse had been captured during the battle. This was what both Rodney and Britain so desperately needed so Grenville was sent back to France to negotiate with both the Americans and the French, but found himself making little progress with either—only when Oswald told him about the Canada proposal did he begin to understand why, and he wrote an indignant letter to Charles Fox, who was no happier about what his hated rival Shelburne was doing. Having exposed the trickery to his colleagues, at the end of June Fox proposed a vote that the independence of the United States should be accepted without preconditions, but in the light of Rodney's victory and the consequent French weakness, this was rejected (though the news that a combined Spanish and American fleet had forced the surrender to Spain of the Bahamas arrived in Britain at about this time).

On 1 July, Lord Rockingham, the figurehead leader of the government, died, so Shelburne was forced to take over, which led to the resignation of Fox and a massive split in the anti-war Whig party in Parliament. Regardless of this, the remainder of the negotiations would be carried out under Shelburne's devious leadership. For example, he took advantage of the great delay in trans-Atlantic communication to send a letter to George Washington stating that Britain was accepting American independence without preconditions, while not authorising Richard Oswald to make any such promise when he returned to Paris to negotiate with Franklin and his colleagues (John Jay had by this time returned from Spain).

=== Diplomatic manoeuvres ===
While the British were busy trying to stabilise their second new government of the year, Franklin neutralised what could have been France's biggest weapon against the United States—the vagueness of the repayment terms for the loans the French had been making to the Americans every few months since 1778. These totalled 18,000,000 livres (equivalent to over 2.5 million Spanish dollars—the preferred hard currency in America) plus an additional 10,000,000 livres (nearly 1.5 million dollars) which had been borrowed from the Dutch by King Louis XVI of France on America's behalf in 1781 when no international lender would loan anything directly to the Americans. By a contract dated 16 July 1782, America was to pay this money back on very favourable terms, with no payments due at all until three years after peace was finalised (a stipulation which would lead fairly directly to the next great milestone in American history, the Constitution of 1787).

The French too played their diplomatic cards with some skill. While preparing to aid the Spanish forces in a massive assault on the fortress at Gibraltar, they stalled for time by insisting on American independence as a precondition for negotiation. They also sent a secret envoy to speak directly with Shelburne in England, for there were some matters on which they were seriously opposed to the Americans. The most notable of these was the rich Newfoundland fishery, one of the main factors which had drawn the French across the Atlantic over 250 years earlier, and which they had managed to retain as a concession when the British took Canada in 1763. As British colonists, the Americans had rights to fish in these waters, but as the United States they would have no legal right to fish there unless it could be written into the peace treaty. For Britain, the logical course would be to make France give its rights to the Americans. The Americans also wanted fishing rights in the Gulf of Mexico, to which again they had previously been entitled thanks to the British colonies in Florida (now controlled by Spain).

The French and Spanish negotiators were also concerned about the American insistence on the Mississippi River as a western border; the existing area of the thirteen States was already about as large as France and Spain combined, and the proposed border would double that. In particular, Spain's territories in Louisiana and the newly reconquered West Florida would be severely threatened if the American trend of economic growth based on expanded land holdings continued. The situation of the American Indians in these lands was noted, but for practical purposes ignored because they could not significantly defend themselves. In their opposition to this expansion, ironically, the French and Spanish governments were effectively supporting the British on one of the points which had begun the move towards revolution in the 1760s—the use of military forces (paid for by taxes) to maintain a clear border between the colonies and the American Indian lands west of the Appalachians. Meanwhile, the American case was strengthened by the charters of the earliest colonies, which specified, in deliberate disregard of the claims of other nations, that they could expand from the east coast of America to the west coast.

=== Anglo-American understanding ===
Franklin became ill with gout towards the end of summer, but when John Jay learned in September of the secret French mission to England, and the French position on the fisheries, he sent a message to Shelburne himself, explaining in some detail why he should avoid being influenced too much by the French and Spanish. At the same time Richard Oswald was asking if the terms of his commission to negotiate with the Americans could be slightly reworded to acknowledge that the 13 so-called colonies referred to themselves as "United States", and about 24 September, the Americans received word that this had been done. This was one of the best-timed British moves of the whole war. From 20 September, reports of the great French and Spanish assault on Gibraltar began to reach Paris; all were negative, and by 27 September it was clear that the operation, involving more troops than had ever been in service at one time on the entire North American continent, had been a horrific disaster. The French had done all they could to help the Spanish achieve their essential war aim, and began serious discussions on alternative exit strategies, urging Spain to offer Britain some very large concessions in return for Gibraltar. Although the fortress still remained under siege, there was no serious threat from the French and Spanish forces after Richard Howe had relieved the place in October.

In Paris, the British and American negotiators left the French and Spanish to argue between themselves, but John Adams was also still negotiating actively with the Dutch Republic, and on 8 October, the United Provinces and the United States signed a full treaty of amity and commerce. By this time the American envoys were aware of the letter to George Washington, so independence was taken as a done deal, and discussions concentrated on the details. Remarkably, Britain accepted the American demand that the boundary with Canada should revert to its state after the Seven Years' War in 1763, not the revision of the Quebec Act in 1774. The difference between the two was the whole area east of the Mississippi and north of the Ohio River—the Northwest Territory, from which five-and-a-half new States would later emerge. John Adams can claim credit for smoothing the peace talks by separating the issues of personal debts and war reparations. The latter were a particular problem for the British, because as early as 1775 Loyalists in some parts of the then-colonies had been forced into exile by local statutes imposing an "Army Test"—nearly all males of suitable age had to join the local militia, which, as had become clear in the first battles of the Revolution, would be expected to fight against the forces of King George III, whom they viewed as their legal ruler. Possessions these people could not take with them had quickly been confiscated and sold off. It was equally clear that those who had stayed in America and fought for him whom they viewed as their legitimate sovereign would be even more heavily penalised unless safeguards could be built into the treaty. Franklin countered this argument by suggesting that reparations could be demanded for the massive destruction of American property by British forces, which had been a very deliberate policy in the later stages of the war, and for the "kidnap" of tens of thousands of valuable slaves (who had roughly the same consideration in these negotiations as the American Indians); besides which, the confiscations of Loyalist property had been made by individual State governments, not the Congress. The French negotiator Charles Gravier, comte de Vergennes intervened in this discussion on the British side, but the result was a messy compromise, in which Congress was instructed merely to urge the State governments to make reparations to the Loyalists.

=== Peace with the United States ===
In the Caribbean at this time, the British were not using their fleet to recapture islands which would then have to be defended, but concentrating on holding the few that remained. The same principle applied everywhere, and in September 1782, the Royal Navy had sent a large supply convoy to Gibraltar on the assumption that by the time it arrived, either the fortress would have been conquered, or the great assault would have been repelled and the siege weakened. The convoy was protected by 33 of the Navy's biggest ships, and on 10 October, as hoped, unloading of supplies at Gibraltar began. A large combined French and Spanish fleet hovered nearby, so on 20 October the British fleet, without seriously engaging for battle, lured them away. News that Gibraltar was fully resupplied, with no problems for the convoy, reached London on 7 November, and probably reached Paris about the same time. The objections of Spain ceased to be of any relevance, and the French accepted the preliminary peace treaty between Great Britain and the United States, on 30 November, with protests but no action.

=== Peace with France and Spain ===
Over the next few weeks, serious negotiations began between Britain, France and Spain (for which Britain's chief negotiator was Alleyne FitzHerbert, and Spain's the Count of Aranda). Although a French naval expedition had destroyed British trading posts in Hudson Bay during the summer, no territory had actually been captured. From time to time, news would arrive from India of continuing stalemate, both in the land wars (which involved the French only as supporters to local rulers) and in naval battles; the British still appeared to hold all the French territory there that they had captured in 1778–79, while the French held no British territory. In the West Indies, on the other hand, the French still held all the territory they had captured, while the British held only one French island, St. Lucia. The Spanish held West Florida, the Bahamas and Menorca, and they were still maintaining an increasingly futile siege of Gibraltar. An attempt to exchange Puerto Rico for Gibraltar collapsed, probably because it would have brought too much competition for Jamaican products into the protected British market.

In the preliminary treaties signed with France and Spain on 20 January 1783, France and Britain therefore returned to each other nearly all the territories they had taken from each other since 1778, except for Tobago, which the French had captured in 1781 and were allowed to keep. France also gained some territory around the Senegal River in Africa which it had lost to Britain in 1763. The whole arrangement for fishing around the Newfoundland coast had to be renegotiated because of the rights awarded to the Americans. The Spanish did much better. They did not have to hand back West Florida or Menorca, and were also given East Florida in exchange for the Bahamas (so tens of thousands of refugees who had fled to East Florida from the United States had to move again). Both East Florida and part of West Florida had been Spanish possessions before 1763, so the 1783 treaty did not specify boundaries, allowing the Spanish to claim that the 1763 boundaries still applied (the remainder of West Florida had been part of French Louisiana before 1763, and the rest of Louisiana had then been handed over to Spain). The opportunity was taken to resolve long-standing disputes about logwood cutting in Central America. The British, however, continued to hold Gibraltar after the siege was abandoned.

Although France was an ally of both the United States and Spain, Spain was merely a cobelligerent rather than an ally of the United States, though an informal alliance had existed since at least 1776 between the Americans and Bernardo de Gálvez, Spanish governor of Louisiana, one of the most successful leaders in the war. Spain's economy depended almost entirely on its colonial empire in the Americas, and a successful revolt by subjects of another colonial empire could set a ruinous example. In fact, there had been a series of three rebellions by native South Americans against Spain between 1777 and 1781, led by Tomás Katari, Túpac Amaru II, and Julian Apasa (who adopted the name Túpac Katari)—all had been crushed with utter ruthlessness. With such considerations in mind, Spain continually thwarted John Jay's attempts to establish diplomatic relations during his long assignments in Madrid. Following Spain's preliminary peace treaty with Britain, Spain was the last participant in the American Revolutionary War to acknowledge the independence of the United States. This tacit recognition came when Floridablanca instructed the Count of Aranda to sign a treaty with the United States on March 17, 1783.

=== Peace with the Dutch Republic ===
The Dutch had never captured anything from the British, and only French military action had saved them from losing virtually all their colonies. They could exercise no leverage over Britain, Spain, France, or the United States in the peace negotiations, and did not make a preliminary treaty until 2 September 1783, the day before the other three treaties were formalised. Britain agreed to return nearly all Dutch possessions captured in the East Indies (the most important of which, Trincomalee on Ceylon, had already been retaken by the French anyway) but kept Negapatnam on the Indian coast. In a major concession Britain also secured free trade rights in parts of the Dutch East Indies.

== Sealing the deal ==
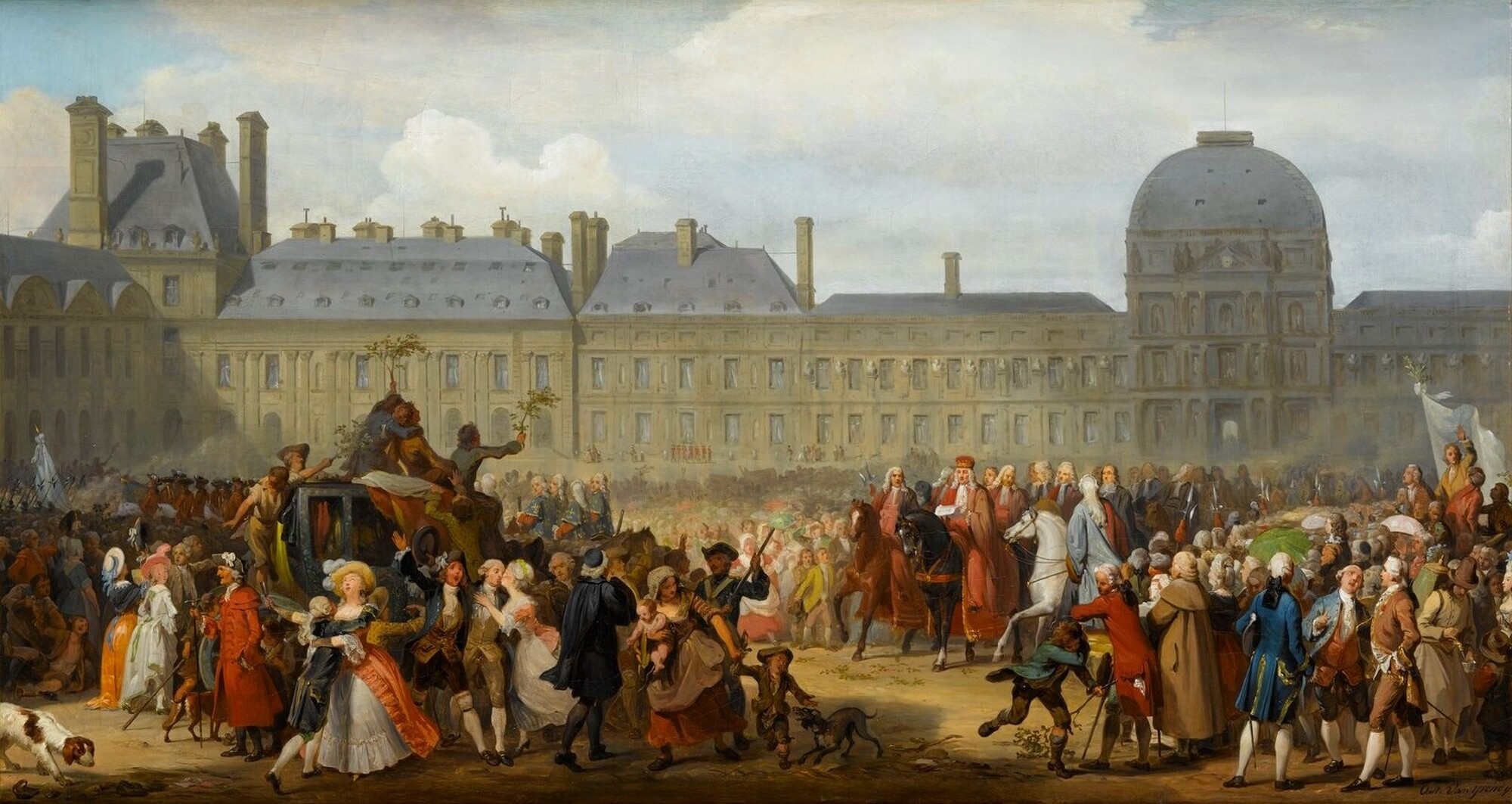
Publication of the Treaty of Peace, 25 November 1783

The terms of the peace, particularly the proposed treaty with the United States, caused a political storm in Britain. The concession of the Northwest Territory and the Newfoundland fisheries, and especially the apparent abandonment of Loyalists by an Article which the individual States would inevitably ignore, were condemned in Parliament. The last point was the easiest solved—British tax revenue saved by not continuing the war would be used to compensate Loyalists. Nevertheless, on 17 February 1783 and again on 21 February, motions against the treaty were successful in Parliament, so on 24 February Lord Shelburne resigned, and for five weeks the British government was without a leader. Finally, a solution similar to the previous year's choice of Lord Rockingham was found. The new government was to be led, nominally, by the Duke of Portland, while the two Secretaries of State were to be Charles Fox and, remarkably, Lord North. Richard Oswald was replaced by a new negotiator, David Hartley, but the Americans refused to allow any modifications to the treaty—partly because they would have to be approved by Congress, which, with two Atlantic crossings, would take several months. Therefore, on 3 September 1783, at Hartley's hotel in Paris, the treaty as agreed by Richard Oswald the previous November was formally signed, and at Versailles the separate treaties with France and Spain were also formalized.

== Treaty with the United States ==
Based on preliminary articles made 30 November 1782, and approved by the Congress of the Confederation on 15 April 1783, this treaty was signed on 3 September 1783, and ratified by Congress on 14 January 1784, formally ending the American Revolutionary War.

== Treaty with France ==
Preliminary articles had been signed 20 January 1783, at Versailles

1. Declaration of peace, and forgetfulness of past problems.
2. Confirmation of old treaties between the two nations.
3. Exchange of prisoners and hostages to take place within six weeks of ratification; also ships (naval and merchant) captured after hostilities at sea officially cease are to be returned
4. British crown to retain Newfoundland and adjacent islands, except Saint Pierre and Miquelon.
5. French crown surrenders fishing rights between Cape Bonavista and Cape St. John (on the east coast of Newfoundland); but instead keeps fishing rights between Cape St. John and Cape Ray (along the west coast of Newfoundland).
6. The French may still fish in the Gulf of St. Lawrence.
7. In the West Indies, British crown returns Saint Lucia to France and also surrenders Tobago, subject to guarantees of the rights of British settlers in both islands.
8. French crown returns Grenada, St. Vincent, Dominica, St. Christopher (St. Kitts), Nevis and Montserrat to Britain, subject to guarantees of the right of French settlers in any of those islands.
9. In Africa, British crown surrenders the Senegal River area to France, and returns to France the island of Gorée.
10. French crown guarantees to British crown possession of the Gambia river area and Fort James.
11. British shall have right to carry on the gum trade from the mouth of the River St. John to Portendic Bay, but may not establish permanent settlements there (boundaries of the various African possessions to be determined by commissioners to be chosen within 3 months of ratification).
12. British and French access to other parts of the African coast to continue as customary.
13. In India, British crown returns to France all settlements on the Orissa coast and in Bengal, as at the beginning of the war—with liberty for the French to make a ditch round Chandannagar (for drainage)—and will as far as possible provide security for French trade in the area.
14. The British crown also delivers Pondicherry and Karikal to France, with additions to the former at Valanour and Bahour, and the latter absorbing the four Magans bordering on it.
15. Mahé and the factory at Surat also returned to French control, with security provisions as in Article 13.
16. Britain and France will cease to aid their respective Indian allies against each other within four months (ceasefire orders having already been sent to British and French forces in India).
17. British crown abandons restrictions on French use of the port of Dunkirk in France.
18. The two crowns will make new commercial agreements by the end of 1786.
19. All territories conquered by either side since the war began, and not mentioned above, are to be returned to their pre-war owners.
20. The two nations should be able to enter into their respective possessions of St. Pierre & Miquelon, St. Lucia, Gorée, Grenada, the Grenadines, St. Vincent, Dominica, St. Christopher, Nevis & Montserrat, within three months of ratification of the treaty. For Indian towns etc., within 6 months.
21. to 24. Technical details.

Signed at Versailles, 3 September 1783, by George Montagu, 4th Duke of Manchester and Charles Gravier, comte de Vergennes.

Supplementary notes indicate that the use of the French language for the treaties shall not be deemed to set a precedent; and clarify arrangements for preventing local disputes between British and French fishermen on Newfoundland, etc.

=== Significant points ===
- Compare Article 5 with the provision for fishing rights in the treaty with the United States. This was one of the main stumbling-blocks in the peace negotiations, as the two allies both wanted the same thing.
- Note that several Articles relate to return of territories, not to surrender; for the most part this treaty simply restored the territorial situation which existed before France entered the war, a bitter disappointment for French observers.

== Treaty with Spain ==
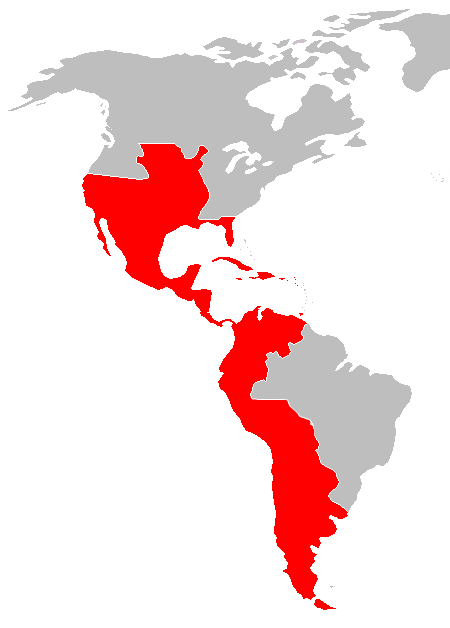
Spanish American colonies at their maximum extent, after the Peace of Paris, 1783

Preliminary articles had been signed 20 January 1783, at Versailles.

1. Declaration of peace, and forgetfulness of past problems.
2. Confirmation of old treaties between the two nations.
3. Exchange of prisoners and hostages to take place within 6 weeks of ratification; also ships (naval and merchant) captured after hostilities at sea officially cease are to be returned.
4. British crown surrenders Menorca to Spain.
5. British crown cedes and surrenders East Florida and West Florida to Spain—British inhabitants have 18 months from the date of ratification to leave (this may be extended if they are unable to arrange sale of their possessions within that time).
6. In "the Spanish continent" [the majority of America south of the United States] British subjects will be permitted to cut and carry away logwood in the district between the Bellize (or Wallis) river and the Rio Hondo (both of which shall be open to navigators from both nations) up to an isthmus formed by a widening of the Bellize river and a widening of the Rio Nuevo (New River), from where the boundary goes straight across the isthmus to the Rio Nuevo, along the Rio Nuevo to where it comes opposite a river [marked on an accompanying map] which flows into the Rio Hondo; then across to that river, downstream to the Rio Hondo, and finally down the Rio Hondo to the sea. Commissioners will mark out places where the British may establish settlements, and all British subjects within the Spanish continent and offshore islands will move to those settlements within 18 months from ratification (with full assistance from the Spanish authorities). No fortifications may be made within this area, and any now existing must be demolished. The British settlers may also fish for their subsistence off the coast of the designated area, and neighbouring islands (but must not make any other use of the said islands).
7. Spanish crown returns the islands of Providence and the Bahamas to Britain (with similar provisions to Article 5).
8. All territories conquered by either side since the war began, and not mentioned above, are to be returned to their pre-war owners.
9. The two crowns will make new commercial agreements by the end of 1786.
10. The two nations should be able to enter into their respective possessions of East Florida, Providence and the Bahamas within three months of ratification of the treaty, sooner if possible.
11. to 12. Technical details.

Signed at Versailles, 3 September 1783, by George Montagu, 4th Duke of Manchester and Pedro Pablo Abarca de Bolea, 10th Count of Aranda.

=== Significant points ===
- In the short term, Spain probably fared better out of the American Revolutionary War than any other participant, regaining significant territories lost in earlier conflicts, without the massive costs sustained by France and the United States. As with the French treaty, however, some territories were returned to Britain. Significantly, Great Britain managed to retain Gibraltar, which had suffered a long siege.
- Two Articles in this treaty were to have significant effects on the development of the United States, because of the way they interfere with the provisions of the treaty with the US:
  - first, Article 5, by giving back to Spain control of West Florida, in conjunction with existing control over Louisiana, also gave de facto control of the mouth of the Mississippi river, so the United States could not exercise the river navigation rights granted in its peace treaty to gain access from the Mississippi to the sea.
  - second, Article 5, unlike article 6, does not specify boundaries. The Spanish government assumed that this implied the northern boundary Florida had when it was previously in Spanish possession—but the treaty with the United States did specify a southern boundary for the US, which from a Spanish point of view encroached on their historic territory.

== Treaty with the Dutch Republic ==
Preliminary articles were signed 2 September 1783 at Paris.

1. Declaration of peace, and forgetfulness of past problems
2. Respect for each other's flags at sea to be resumed
3. Exchange of prisoners and hostages to take place as soon as possible, without waiting for ratification; also ships (naval and merchant) captured after hostilities at sea officially cease are to be returned
4. In India, the States General of the Republic surrender the town of Negapatnam to the British crown, but may exchange it for some equivalent property if they have such available
5. British crown returns Trinquemale (Trincomalee) to the States General, with all other Dutch towns, forts, harbours and settlements conquered by the British forces (including East India Company forces) during the war
6. The States General promise not to obstruct the navigation of British subjects in the Eastern Seas
7. Commissioners shall be appointed to discuss navigation rights on the African coast, and the subject of Cape Apollonia [in what is now Ghana], which have been the source of disputes between the English African Company and the Dutch West India Company
8. All territories conquered by either side since the war began, and not mentioned above, are to be returned to their pre-war owners
9. to 11. Technical details

Signed at Paris, 20 May 1784, by Daniel Hailes; Lestevenon van Berkenroode and Gerard Brantsen.

=== Significant points ===
- The Dutch had been dragged into the war in 1780, after discreetly supporting the United States and France since the beginning; incapable of defending their colonies, they were saved by France, which recovered nearly all Dutch territory captured by the British.
- The key point in this treaty is Article 6, which allowed British ships to navigate unmolested in the seas to the south-east of India, facilitating the development of later British colonies such as Singapore and Australia (and serving as a wedge to force a way into Dutch trading territory in the area).

== Full texts (French and English) ==
- Jenkinson, Charles A Collection of All the Treaties of Peace, Alliance, and Commerce Between Great Britain and Other Powers vol. 3, pages 410 onward. London, Debrett (1785), via Google Books – accessed 2008-01-03
