= Alicia Hill (1811 ship) =

UK merchant vessel (1811–1820)

History

United Kingdom
- Name: Alicia Hill
- Launched: 1807, France
- Acquired: Acquired 1811 by purchase by of a prize
- Fate: Wrecked November 1820

General characteristics
- Tons burthen: 91, or 112 (bm)
- Armament: 4 × 4-pounder guns

Alicia Hill was launched in 1807, in France under another name. She was taken in prize and entered British ownership in 1811. In 1812, a French privateer captured her, but the Royal Navy quickly recaptured her. She primarily traded with the Mediterranean. Still, in 1818, pirates plundered her off the coast of Sierra Leone. She was wrecked at Odessa in the Black Sea in November 1820.

== Career ==
Alicia Hill, Redmayne, master, arrived on 4 June 1810, at Liverpool. She had come from Guadeloupe, suggesting that she may have been captured a few months after the invasion of Guadeloupe (1810) in January–February. Whether she was a prize from that campaign or had been taken earlier and elsewhere in the Caribbean is an open question.

Alicia Hill first appeared in Lloyd's Register (LR) in the issue for 1811.

Year	Master	Owner	Trade	Source
1811	W.Tolson; LeBrun	Captain & Co.	Liverpool–Lisbon	LR
1811	W.Tolson; LeBrun	Edwards	Liverpool–Lisbon; Bristol–Gibraltar	Register of Shipping

On 10 May 1812, HMS Sybille captured the French privateer Aigle at 49°6′N 8°22′W. Aigle was the former Weymouth to Guernsey packet Chesterfield. Aigle, of 61 men under the command of Captain Alexander Black, had thrown eight of her 14 guns overboard while trying to escape Sybille. Aigle was three days out of Bennodet, near Quimper, and had earlier captured the brig Alicia as Alicia was sailing from Bristol to Gibraltar. (Note: A French privateer lugger had captured Earl of Chesterfield Packet in late 1811, as the packet was sailing to Guernsey.) Aigle had captured Alicia Hill, Le Brun, master, at 48°26′N 9°58′W. HMS Rota recaptured Alicia Hill, which arrived on 19 July, at Plymouth, and which had a cargo of beer and sundries. Aigle arrived at Cork on 15 July.

Alicia Hill, P.LeBrun, master, arrived at Liverpool on 28 November 1812 from Malalga. She was carrying a cargo of raisins, almonds, reeds, and jars of grapes.

Year	Master	Owner	Trade	Source & notes
1813	LeBrun; P.Crawford	R.Edwards	Falmouth–Gibraltar	LR
1814	P.Crawford	Corkhill & Co.	Liverpool–Oporto	LR; raised and repaired 1813
1818	P.Crawford; J.Blray	Captain & Co.	Liverpool–Leghorn; Liverpool–Brazil	LR; raised and repaired 1813

A letter from Sierra Leone dated 27 January 1818, reported that Alicia Hill, of Liverpool, had arrived at Freetown from the leeward part of the coast. She had encountered a brig and a schooner that had plundered her of all her outward bound cargo, her spare sails, cordage, wearing apparel, and about a ton of ivory. The brig was reportedly armed with fourteen 24-pounder cannons, and the schooner with one long gun amidships. It took the pirates two days to complete their plundering. Alicia Hill had been on her way to Liverpool from Sierra Leone. On 26 April, Alicia Hill, Crawford, master, was at Cork; on 1 May, she arrived at Liverpool. She had a cargo of oil, hides, wax, elephants teeth (ivory tusks), gum copal, and camwood.

She next returned from Pará, Brazil with cotton, rice, and fustic.

Year	Master	Owner	Trade	Source & notes
1819	J.Blray; M.Smyth	M.Swainson	Liverpool–Brazil; Liverpool–Gibraltar	LR; raised and repaired 1813
1820	M.Smith	"CdeBethm"	Liverpool–Gibraltar	LR; raised and repaired 1813
1821	M.Smith	Betham	Liverpool–Gibraltar	Register of Shipping ; sharp raised and damages repaired 1818, & good repair 1819

== Fate ==
Alicia Hill, Sprent, master, was driven ashore and severely damaged on 25 November 1820, at Odessa. She had been lying in the Odessa Roads with a cargo of tallow and linseed, ready to sail to England, when a gale caused her to break her iron cable and drove her ashore. She was on a bed of mud and sand and was full of water. It was believed that she was badly damaged and she was being unloaded. The next report was that she had stranded on 7 December, and that a heavy gale on the 22nd, had broken her to pieces.
