= Busiris (1814 ship) =

History

United Kingdom
- Name: Busiris
- Namesake: Busiris
- Owner: 1814:R. Redman & Co.; 1826:Gardiner
- Builder: St Peter's Dockyard, William Smith & Co, Newcastle upon Tyne
- Launched: 22 November 1814
- Fate: Wrecked 28 May 1826

General characteristics
- Tons burthen: 360, or 361, or 363, or 36331/94 (bm)

Busiris was launched at Newcastle upon Tyne in 1814, as a West Indiaman. She made one voyage as an East Indiaman and then returned to the West Indies trade. She was wrecked in May 1826.

== Career ==
Busiris was offered for sale on 21 April 1815, in the Blackwall Canal, and first appeared in Lloyd's Register (LR) in 1815, with Frankland, master, Redmand & Co., owner, and trade London–Barbados.

On 3 July 1817, Busiris, Franklin, master, arrived at Gravesend from St Lucia.

The British East India Company (EIC) had in 1813 lost its monopoly on the trade between India and Britain. Numerous shipowners then tried out this newly-legal trade. On 2 December 1817, Busiris, J. Balston, master, sailed from Britain for Fort William (Calcutta). She was sailing under a license from the EIC. She arrived at Bengal on 4 May 1818.

Lloyd's Register for 1819, showed Busiris's master changing from Balston to Gardner, and her trade from London–Calcutta to London–St Vincent. On 14 April 1819, Busiris, Gardner, master, sailed from Gravesend for St Vincent.

A letter from St Kitts dated 9 June 1824, reported that Busiris, Gardner, master, had stopped there on 7 June, on her way from Grenada due to a leak. The leak was stopped and Busiris sailed for London the next day.

On 30 December, at Cowes, Beaufort in coming in ran across Busiris's hawse, and sustained some damage.

Lloyd's Register for 1826, showed Busiris with R. Gardinar, master and owner. Her trade changed from London–New Brunswick to London–Grenada.

== Fate ==
Busiris, of London, Jackson, master, wrecked on 28 May 1826, on Cobblers' Rocks, Barbados. Her crew was saved, but almost all of her cargo was lost.
