= Abeona (1811 ship) =

UK merchant ship (1811–1820)

History

United Kingdom
- Name: Abeona
- Namesake: Abeona
- Builder: Newcastle-upon-Tyne
- Launched: 22 March 1811
- Fate: 1820; fire at sea

General characteristics
- Tons burthen: 32375/94, or 331 (bm)
- Propulsion: Sail
- Crew: 21 (at loss)
- Armament: 12 × 12-pounder carronades (1812)

Abeona was launched at Newcastle-upon-Tyne in 1811. A fire at sea destroyed her in November 1820, killing many passengers and crew.

== Career ==
Abeona appears in the 1812 Register of Shipping with Swan, master, T. Heron, owner, and trade Newcastle. In 1815 her master was Weynton, her owners J&T Dawson, and her trade London transport.

The Register of Shipping for 1820 (published in 1819), showed Abeona with Pritchard, master, Dawson & Co., owner, and trade London−Onega (possibly Onega, Russia). Lloyd's List reported on 23 June 1820 that Abeona, Prichard, master, had run aground at Quebec in May as she was sailing to London, but was got off without damage. The same issue had a report from Quebec dated 18 May that the transport Abeona had suffered some damage and would have to be hauled up for repairs.

The Register of Shipping for 1821 carried the same information as the 1820 volume as to master and owner, but Abeona's trade now was London transport.

== Fate ==
The British government chartered Abeona to carry settlers to South Africa under the auspices of the government's 1820 Settlers scheme.

She gathered some 14 passengers in London and then sailed from there to Greenock. At Greenock on 7 October 1820 she took on 126 more. On 13 October she sailed from Greenock, bound for South Africa.

On 25 November she caught fire in the Atlantic Ocean (4°30′N 25°30′W). (The cause was the negligence of the mate, who took a naked candle into the storeroom. He died when he refused to leave the ship while there were still passengers aboard.) A number of the crew and passengers succeeded in getting into three boats. By chance the Portuguese ship Condessa da Ponte, Captain Joaquim Almeida, which was sailing from Bahia, came upon them the next day. She landed the survivors at Lisbon on 20 December 1820. She rescued 49 survivors, including Lieut. Mudge (the agent), Captain Pritchard, the ship's surgeon, 21 men, four women, 16 boys, and five girls. The report from Lisbon stated that 112 crew and passengers had died.

The brig Royal Charlotte, Hobson, master, bound for Greenock, stopped at Lisbon and took on board 16 of the 26 survivors who had boarded at Greenock. Ten male orphans remained in Lisbon under the care of the British Consul and the British Factory there. Royal Charlotte arrived at Greenock on 13 January 1822.

A letter from Greenock dated 15 January said "Arrived here yesterday, the Royal Charlotte, Hobson, from Lisbon, in 17 days, having on board the surgeon, second mate, carpenter, one seaman, and three boys; and also 22 emigrants, part of those saved by the boats from the wreck of the Abeona transport, Capt. PRITCHARD." (Note: Royal Charlotte, W. Hobson, master, of 261 tons (bm), had been launched at Cowes in 1789.)

In early 1821 HMS Sappho sailed to Cape Town via Lisbon. In Lisbon she took on six survivors from Abeona and carried them to South Africa.

Abeona was one of 18 vessels that sailed in that year with settlers for South Africa under the scheme, and the only one to suffer misfortune; another seven vessels brought settlers under private arrangements.
