= Cape Ray =

Headland of Newfoundland, Canada

Cape Ray Lighthouse
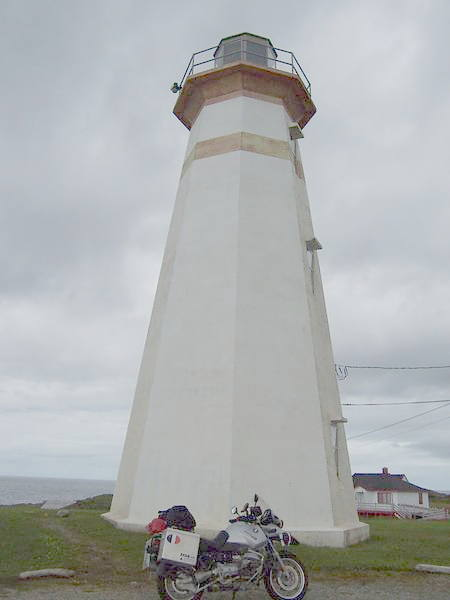
- Location: Cape Ray, Newfoundland and Labrador, Canada
- Coordinates: 47°37′16″N 59°18′14″W

Tower
- Constructed: 1871 (first); 1885 (second)
- Foundation: concrete base
- Construction: wooden tower (first and second) concrete tower (current)
- Height: 15 metres (49 ft)
- Shape: hexagonal tower (first) octagonal tower with balcony and lantern (second and current)
- Markings: white tower with a narrow red horizontal band
- Operator: South West Coast Development Association
- Heritage: recognized federal heritage building of Canada, heritage lighthouse

Light
- First lit: 1959 (current)
- Deactivated: 1885 (first); 1959 (second)
- Focal height: 37 metres (121 ft)
- Range: 17 nautical miles (31 km; 20 mi)
- Characteristic: Fl W 15s

Cape Ray is a headland located at the southwestern extremity of the island of Newfoundland in the Canadian province of Newfoundland and Labrador.

It is the site of the Cape Ray Lighthouse. It is located opposite Cape North on Cape Breton Island, Nova Scotia. Cape Ray the community takes its name from this historic landmark.

== See also ==
- List of lighthouses in Canada
