= List of ship launches in 1780 =

The list of ship launches in 1780 includes a chronological list of some ships launched in 1780.

Date	Ship	Class	Builder	Location	Country	Notes
23 January	Nemesis	Enterprise-class frigate	Jolly, Leathers & Barton	Liverpool	France	For Royal Navy.
24 January	Adamant	Portland-class frigate	Peter Baker	Liverpool	Great Britain	For Royal Navy.
27 January	Terrible	Terrible-class ship of the line	Joseph-Marie-Blaise Coulomb	Toulon	Kingdom of France	For French Navy.
11 February	Aigle	Privateer	Dujardin	Saint-Malo	Kingdom of France	For M. Clonard.
22 February	Bellmont	East Indiaman	John Randall	Rotherhithe	Great Britain	For British East India Company.
6 March	Vénus	Vénus-class frigate		Saint-Malo	Kingdom of France	For French Navy.
7 March	Inflexible	Inflexible-class ship of the line	Barnard	Harwich	Great Britain	For Royal Navy.
20 March	Invincible	First rate	Jean-Denis Chevillard	Rochefort	Kingdom of France	For French Navy.
20 March	Friponne	Fifth rate		Lorient	Kingdom of France	For French Navy.
20 March	Royal Louis	Ship of the line	Pierre-Alexander Forfait	Brest	Kingdom of France	For French Navy.
20 March	Vansittart	East Indiaman	Wells	Rotherhithe	Great Britain	For British East India Company.
23 March	Fortitude	Albion-class ship of the line	John Randall	Rotherhithe	Great Britain	For Royal Navy.
10 April	Saratoga	Sloop-of-war	Wharton & Humphries	Philadelphia, Pennsylvania	United States	For Continental Navy.
19 April	Fée	Fifth rate	Charles Etienne Bombelle	Rochefort	Kingdom of France	For French Navy.
20 April	Assurance	Roebuck-class ship	John Randall	Rotherhithe	Great Britain	For Royal Navy.
April	Duc de Chartres	Privateer		Saint-Malo	Kingdom of France	For private owner.
April	Cupid	Xebec			Republic of Venice	For Venetian Navy.
April	Mercurio	Xebec			Republic of Venice	For Venetian Navy.
3 May	Northumberland	Annibal-class ship of the line	Jacques-Noël Sané	Brest	Kingdom of France	For French Navy.
6 May	Flora	Fifth rate	Adam Hayes	Deptford Dockyard	Great Britain	For Royal Navy.
10 May	Ontario	Sixth rate	Jonathon Coleman	Carleton Island	(Kingdom of Great Britain) Province of Georgia	For Provincial Marine.
12 May	Ne Tron Menia	Aziia-class ship of the line	M. D. Portnov	Arkhangelsk	Russia	For Imperial Russian Navy.
12 May	Sviatoi Ianuarii	Aziia-class ship of the line	I. V. James	Arkhangelsk	Great Britain	For Imperial Russian Navy.
16 May	Astrée	Nymphe-class frigate	Pierre-Augustin Lamonthe Kercaradec	Brest	Kingdom of France	For French Navy.
20 May	Daedalus	Active-class frigate	John Fisher	Liverpool	Great Britain	For Royal Navy.
2 June	Fox	Active-class frigate	George Parsons	Bursledon	Great Britain	For Royal Navy.
2 June	Orpheus	Amazon-class frigate	Adams & Barnard	Deptford	Great Britain	For Royal Navy.
3 June	Minerva	Minerva-class frigate	John Jenner	Woolwich Dockyard	Great Britain	For Royal Navy.
3 June	Orpheus	Amazon-class frigate		Deptford	Great Britain	For Royal Navy.
5 June	Belliqueux	Ardent-class ship of the line	John Perry	Blackwall Yard	Great Britain	For Royal Navy.
16 June	Pandour	Mutin-class Cutter (boat)	Daniel & Jacques Denys	Dunkirk	Kingdom of France	For French Navy.
18 June	Clairvoyant	Mutin-class Cutter (boat)	Denys	Dunkirk	Kingdom of France	For French Navy.
1 July	Leander	Fourth rate	Israel Pownoll & Nicholas Phillips	Chatham Dockyard	Great Britain	For Royal Navy.
6 July	Perun	Perun-class bomb vessel	A. S. Katsanov	Kronstadt	Russia	For Imperial Russian Navy.
19 July	Le Comte d'Avaux	Privateer		Boulogne	Kingdom of France	For private owner.
5 August	Badine	Coquette-class corvette	François-Guillaume Clairain des Lauriers	Toulon	Kingdom of France	For French Navy.
11 August	Sémillante	Coquette-class corvette	Chevalier Antoine Groignard	Toulon	Kingdom of France	For French Navy.
30 August	Active	Fifth rate	Edward Hunt	Northam	Great Britain	For Royal Navy.
31 August	Zebra	Zebra-class sloop	William Cleverley	Gravesend	Great Britain	For Royal Navy.
August	Fair American	Privateer			United States	For United States Navy.
August	Fortune	Sloop-of-war	Joshua Stewart	Sandgaet	Great Britain	For Royal Navy.
16 September	Abondance	Baleine-class gabarre	Jean-Joseph Ginoux	Havre de Grâce	Kingdom of France	For French Navy.
16 September	Sviatoi Georgii Pobedonosets	Aziia-class ship of the line	A. S. Katsanov	Kronstadt	Russia	For Imperial Russian Navy.
20 September	Iphigenia	Amazon-class frigate	James Betts	Mistleythorn	Great Britain	For Royal Navy.
21 September	Sceptre	Second rate	Pierre-Augustin Lamonthe Kercaradec	Brest	Kingdom of France	For French Navy.
30 September	Juno	Amazon-class frigate	Robert Batson & Co.	Limehouse	Great Britain	For Royal Navy.
14 October	Vestale	Magicienne-class frigate	Joseph-Marie-Blaise Coulomb	Toulon	Kingdom of France	For French Navy.
14 October	Magnanime	Intrepid-class ship of the line	Adam Hayes	Deptford Dockyard	Great Britain	For Royal Navy.
16 October	Nourrice	Baleine-class gabarre		Havre de Grâce	Kingdom of France	For French Navy.
28 October	Alceste	Magicienne-class frigate	Joseph-Marie-Blaise Coulomb	Toulon	Kingdom of France	For French Navy.
October	Essex	East Indiaman	John Perry	Blackwall	Great Britain	For British East India Company.
October	Merlin	Sloop-of-war	Thomas King	Dover	Great Britain	For Royal Navy.
October	Valentine	East Indiaman	Perry, or Randall	Blackwall	Great Britain	For British East India Company.
11 November	Alligator	Swan-class sloop	John Fisher	Liverpool	Great Britain	For Royal Navy.
13 November	Téméraire	Facteur-class Cutter (boat)	Arnous-Dessaulays	Lorient	Kingdom of France	For French Navy.
17 November	Majestueux	Terrible-class ship of the line	Joseph-Marie-Blaise Coulomb	Toulon	Kingdom of France	For French Navy.
28 November	Repulse	Intrepid-class ship of the line	Fabian	East Cowes	Great Britain	For Royal Navy.
November	Asia	East Indiaman	John Perry	Blackwall	Great Britain	For British East India Company.
21 December	Naïade	Coquette-class corvette		Toulon	Kingdom of France	For French Navy.
27 December	Amphion	Fifth rate		Chatham Dockyard	Great Britain	For Royal Navy.
31 December	Antelope	East Indiaman	Barnard		Great Britain	For British East India Company.
December	Northumberland	East Indiaman	Wells	Deptford	Great Britain	For British East India Company.
Unknown date	Antelope	Packet ship		River Thames	Great Britain	For Post Office Packet Service.
Unknown date	Arbuthnot	Galley			Unknown	For Royal Navy.
Unknown date	Aurora	Letter of marque			United States	For Mungo Mackay & Thomas Dennie.
Unknown date	Berwick	Full-rigged ship	Watson	Rotherhithe	Great Britain	For private owner.
Unknown date	Blandford	East Indiaman	John Randall	Rotherhithe	Great Britain	For British East India Company.
Unknown date	Brutus	Merchantman		Bordeaux	Kingdom of France	For private owner.
Unknown date	Catharina Wilhelmina	East Indiaman		Rotterdam	Dutch Republic	For Dutch East India Company.
Unknown date	Defence	Luggage boat		Bombay	India	For British East India Company.
Unknown date	Ditmarsken	Indfødsretten-class ship of the line			Denmark-Norway	For Dano-Norwegian Navy.
Unknown date	Dolfijn	Sixth rate		Amsterdam	Dutch Republic	For Dutch Navy.
Unknown date	Duc de Chartres	Privateer		Havre de Grâce	Kingdom of France	For private owner.
Unknown date	Fishburn	Merchantman		Whitby	Great Britain	For Leighton & Co.
Unknown date	Fortitude	East Indiaman	Wells	Deptford	Great Britain	For British East India Company.
Unknown date	Hannibal	Privateer		Newburyport, Massachusetts	United States	For Massachusetts State Navy.
Unknown date	Hermanis	East Indiaman		Bombay	India	For British East India Company.
Unknown date	Hifz-i Huda	Fourth rate	builder	Rhodes	Ottoman Greece	For Ottoman Navy.
Unknown date	Hornby	full-rigged ship		Bombay	India	For private owner.
Unknown date	Intrepid	Snow		Bombay	India	For Bombay Marine.
Unknown date	Kingston	West Indiaman		Bristol	Great Britain	For J. Collard.
Unknown date	L'Epervier	Privateer		Saint-Malo	Kingdom of France	For Cornich, Cornic & Le Jeune.
Unknown date	Le Pilote	Privateer		Saint-Malo	Kingdom of France	For private owner.
Unknown date	Osterley	East Indiaman	Wells	Deptford	Great Britain	For British East India Company.
Unknown date	Pigot	East Indiaman	Perry	Blackwall Yard	Great Britain	For British East India Company.
Unknown date	Rattlesnake	Privateer	John Peck	Plymouth, Massachusetts	United States	For Massachusetts State Navy.
Unknown date	Rhodes	Privateer			United States	For Massachusetts State Navy.
Unknown date	Russian Merchant	Merchantman		Whitby	Great Britain	For Leighton & Co.
Unknown date	Santa Natalia	Sixth rate		Ferrol	Spain	For Spanish Navy.
Unknown date	Ship Sloop No. 3	Caspian Sea-class ship sloop		Kazan	Russia	For Imperial Russian Navy.
Unknown date	Surprize	Merchantman	Calvert & Co.	Shoreham-by-Sea	Great Britain	For private owner.
Unknown date	Tarleton	Merchantman		Glasgow	Kingdom of Great Britain	For Mr. Crosbie.
Unknown date	Tevfikü'llah	Fourth rate	builder	Rhodes	Ottoman Greece	For Ottoman Navy.
Unknown date	Trial	Packet ship		Calcutta	India	For British East India Company.
Unknown date	Vlieger	Full-rigged ship	J. Hand	Enkhuizen	Dutch Republic	For Dutch Navy.
Unknown date	Unnamed	Bomb vessel		Kazan	Russia	For Imperial Russian Navy.
Unknown date	Name unknown	Merchantman			Kingdom of France	For private owner.
Unknown date	Name unknown	Merchantman			Kingdom of France	For private owner.
Unknown date	Name unknown	Merchantman		Folkestone	Great Britain	For private owner.
Unknown date	Name unknown	Merchantman			Great Britain	For private owner.
Unknown date	Name unknown	Merchantman		Arkhangelsk	Russia	For private owner.
Unknown	Name unknown	Merchantman			Spain	For private owner.
Unknown date	Name unknown	Merchantman			United States	For private owner.
Unknown date	Name unknown	Merchantman			United States	For private owner.
Unknown date	Name unknown	Merchantman		Philadelphia, Pennsylvania	United States	For private owner.
Unknown date	Name unknown	Merchantman			Unknown	For private owner.
Unknown date	Name unknown	Merchantman			United States	For private owner.
