= French ship Terrible =

16 ships of the French Navy have borne the name Terrible or Le Terrible ([lə tɛ.ʁibl]; "(the) terrible [fearsome, intimidating]"):

- French ship Terrible (1670), a 68-gun ship of the line (1670–1678), built at Brest. She took part in the Battle of Schooneveld on 7 June 1673. She was wrecked in the Caribbean Sea on the 11 May 1678.
- French ship Terrible (1680), an 80-gun ship of the line (1679–1692). Built at Brest in 1679, she took part in the Battle of Bévézier on 10 July 1690 and in the Battle of La Hougue; she was burnt by Anglo-Dutch forces at La Hougue on 3 June 1692.
- French ship Terrible (1684), a Fulminante-class bomb ship (1684–1697) built in Toulon
- French ship Terrible (1693), a 100-gun ship of the line (1693–1714) built at Brest, which took part in the Battle of Lagos (1693) and in the Battle of Vélez-Málaga on 24 August 1704
- French ship Terrible (1739), a 74-gun ship of the line (1737–1762). Built at Toulon, she was launched in 1739 and took part in the Battle of Toulon in 1744. She was captured by the British on 25 October 1747.
- French ship Terrible (1780), a 110-gun ship of the line, lead ship of her class (1779–1802). Built at Toulon, she took part in the Battle of the Glorious First of June and to the cruise of Bruix in 1799.
- French ship Terrible (1793), a gunboat (1793–1795) built at Dieppe, renamed to Trombe in 1795.
- French ship Terrible (1793), a gunboat (1793–1795); along with Chiffonne, she captured the 40-gun British frigate HMS Minerva in 1803
- French ship Terrible (1796), a privateer (1796), was captured and destroyed by HMS Hazard.
- Terrible, a privateer captured by HMS Penguin on the 24 May 1797.
- Terrible, a bomb ship (1800)
- Terrible, a 110-gun Commerce de Paris-class ship of the line (1811–1814) built in Antwerp, never finished and sold for scrap.
- Bretagne, a steam and sail ship of the line (1849–1881) started in Brest in 1849 as Bretagne, she was launched in 1855. In 1866, she was used as barracks. She was renamed to Ville de Bordeaux in 1880 and took part in the Crimean War (1854–1855).
- French ironclad Terrible (1877), an ironclad coast-guard (1877–1911). Launched in 1881, she displaced 7,700 tonnes with 6,200 horsepower (4,623 kW). She carried two 274 mm guns, four 100 mm guns and two torpedo launchers. She was decommissioned and used as a target ship.
- French destroyer Le Terrible, a destroyer of the Le Fantasque class.
- French submarine Le Terrible (S612), a strategic nuclear submarine (SNLE) of the Redoutable class launched on 12 December 1969 and decommissioned on the 1 July 1996.
- French submarine Le Terrible (S619), a strategic nuclear submarine (SNLE) of the Triomphant class, launched on 21 March 2008 and join active service in 2010.
