= HMS Assurance (1780) =

Fifth-rate of the Royal Navy

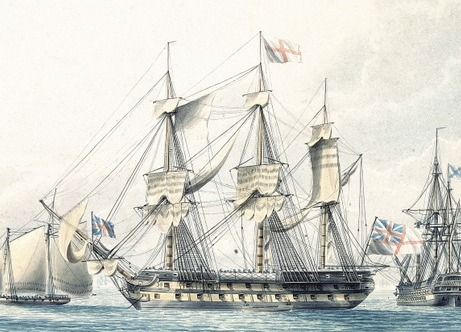
- Assurance's sister ship HMS Argo

History

United Kingdom
- Name: Assurance
- Ordered: 20 May 1778
- Builder: Randall & Co, Rotherhithe
- Cost: £20,922
- Laid down: 11 June 1778
- Launched: 20 April 1780
- Completed: 15 July 1780
- Commissioned: April 1780
- Fate: Broken up March 1815

General characteristics
- Class & type: Roebuck-class fifth-rate
- Tons burthen: 898 45/94 (bm)
- Length: 140 ft 4 in (42.8 m) (gundeck); 115 ft 11 1/2 in (35.3 m) (keel)
- Beam: 38 ft 2 in (11.6 m)
- Draught: 10 ft 3 in (3.1 m) (forward); 14 ft 9 in (4.5 m) (aft)
- Depth of hold: 16 ft 4 1/2 in (5.0 m)
- Propulsion: Sails
- Complement: 280 (300 from 1783)
- Armament: 1780; Lower deck: 20 × 18-pounder guns; Upper deck: 22 × 9-pounder guns; Quarterdeck: Nil; Forecastle: 2 × 6-pounder guns; 1793; Lower deck: 22 × 24-pounder carronades; Upper deck: 20 × 12-pounder guns; Quarterdeck: 4 × 24-pounder carronades; Forecastle: 2 × 24-pounder carronades; 1796; Lower deck: Nil; Upper deck: 16 × 9-pounder guns; Quarterdeck: 4 × 6-pounder guns; Forecastle: 2 × 6-pounder guns

HMS Assurance was a 44-gun fifth-rate Roebuck-class ship of the Royal Navy launched in 1780. Commissioned in the same year, the ship served throughout the remainder of the American Revolutionary War on the North America Station. Her service there included capturing the American privateer Rattlesnake on 17 June 1781 and coordinating the evacuation of Savannah, Georgia, in July 1782. Having briefly served as a troop ship during the subsequent peace, Assurance was recommissioned in 1793 for the French Revolutionary Wars. Operating in the West Indies, she served in Sir John Jervis' fleet that captured Martinique, St Lucia, and Guadeloupe in March and April 1794, also playing a part in the capture of the French frigate Bienvenue on 17 March.

Assurance was given over to the Transport Board for use as a troop ship in 1796. With a stripped down armament she served in this capacity at first in the Mediterranean Sea and then returned again to the West Indies. Part of a convoy sailing from Martinique in 1798, Assurance assisted in saving the crew of the storm-stricken store ship HMS Etrusco on 25 August. The ship was then in ordinary at Woolwich Dockyard, serving as a receiving ship, between 1799 and 1815 at which point she was broken up.

== Design ==
Assurance was a 44-gun, 18-pounder Roebuck-class ship. The class was a revival of the design used to construct the fifth-rate HMS Roebuck in 1769, by Sir Thomas Slade. The ships, while classified as fifth-rates, were not frigates because they carried two gun decks, of which a frigate would have only one. Roebuck was designed as such to provide the extra firepower a ship of two decks could bring to warfare but with a much lower draught and smaller profile. From 1751 to 1776 only two ships of this type were built for the Royal Navy because it was felt that they were anachronistic, with the lower (and more heavily armed) deck of guns being so low as to be unusable in anything but the calmest of waters. (Note: This problem was demonstrated in a sister ship of Assurance, HMS Argo, which two French frigates captured in 1783 because the weather was so bad she was not able to open her lower gun ports during the battle.) In the 1750s the cruising role of the 44-gun two deck ship was taken over by new 32- and 36-gun frigates, leaving the type almost completely obsolete.

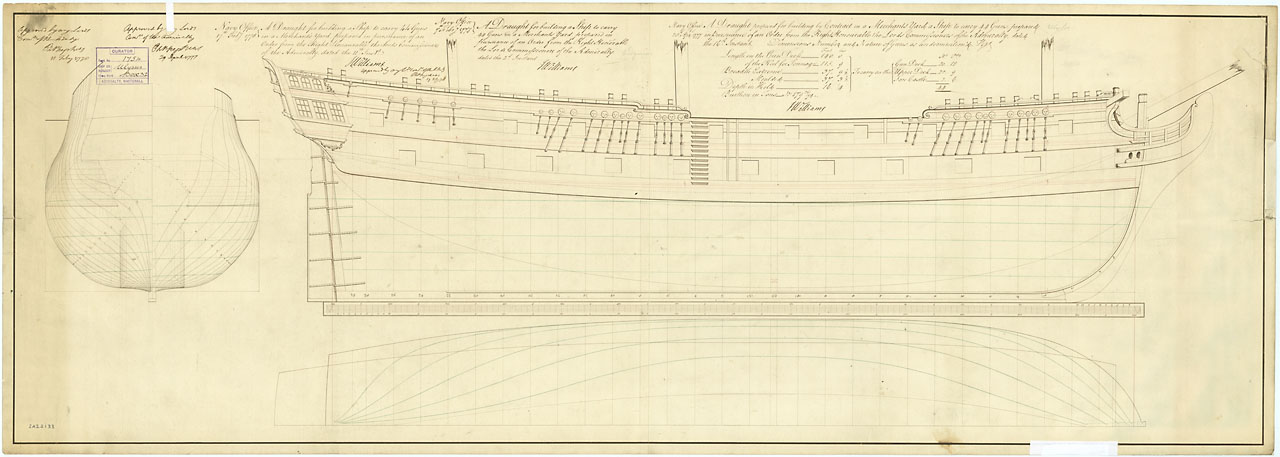
Plan of the Roebuck-class ships

When the American Revolutionary War began in 1775 a need was found for heavily armed ships that could fight in the shallow coastal waters of North America, where two-decked third-rates could not safely sail, and so the Roebuck class of nineteen ships, alongside the similar Adventure class, was ordered to the specifications of the original ships to fill this need. The frigate classes that had overtaken the 44-gun ship as the preferred design for cruisers were at this point still mostly armed with 9- and 12-pounder guns, and it was expected that the class's heavier 18-pounders would provide them with an advantage over these vessels. Frigates with larger armaments would go on to be built by the Royal Navy later on in the American Revolutionary War, but these ships were very expensive and so Assurance and her brethren continued to be built as a cheaper alternative.

== Construction ==
Ships of the class built after 1782 received an updated armament, replacing the small upper deck 9-pounder guns with more modern 12-pounders. Assurance, constructed before this, followed more closely to the 1769 armament of Roebuck and did not receive these changes. All ships laid down after the first four of the class, including Assurance, had the double level of stern windows Roebuck had been designed with removed and replaced with a single level of windows, moving the style of the ships closer to that of a true frigate. (Note: While the earlier ships of the class had two levels of stern windows, there was only ever one level of cabins behind them.)

All but one ship of the class were contracted out to civilian dockyards for construction, and the contract for Assurance was given to Randall & Co at Rotherhithe. The ship was ordered on 20 May 1778, laid down on 11 June the same year and launched on 20 April 1780 with the following dimensions: 140 feet 4 inches (42.8 m) along the gun deck, 115 feet 11 1/2 inches (35.3 m) at the keel, with a beam of 38 feet 2 inches (11.6 m) and a depth in the hold of 16 feet 4 1/2 inches (5.0 m). Her draught, which made the class so valued in the American Revolutionary War, was 10 feet 3 inches (3.1 m) forward and 14 feet 9 inches (4.5 m) aft. She measured 898 45/94 tons burthen. The fitting out process for Assurance was completed on 15 July at Deptford Dockyard where she also received her copper sheathing. Her construction and fitting out cost in total £20,922.

Assurance received an armament of twenty smoothbore 18-pounder long guns on her lower deck, with twenty-two 9-pounders on the upper deck. These were complemented by two 6-pounders on the forecastle; the quarterdeck was unarmed. The ship was to have a crew of 280 men, which was increased to 300 in 1783. Her name had been used by the Royal Navy since 1605.

== Service ==
=== American Revolutionary War ===
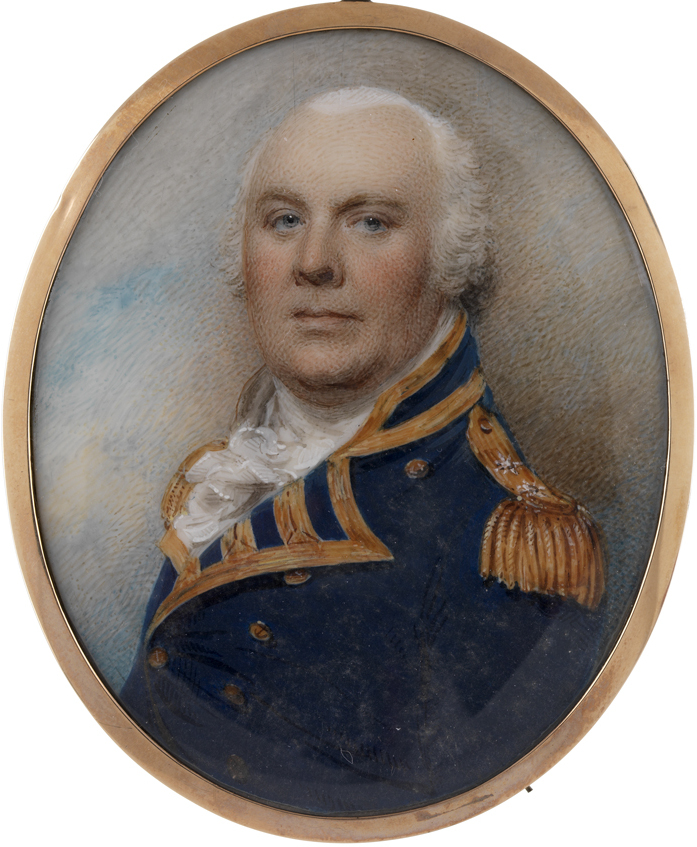
Captain James Cumming was Assurance's first commanding officer

Assurance was commissioned by Captain James Cumming in April 1780, while the ship was still being completed. She sailed on 27 October to join the North America Station. There, the ship captured the American privateer brig Duke of Leinster on 23 May 1781, and two days later took the schooner Fanny. Subsequently serving alongside the 24-gun frigate HMS Charlestown and 24-gun post-ship HMS Amphitrite, on 7 June the three ships came across the 16-gun ship-sloop HMS Atalanta in Boston Bay. Atalanta had been captured by an American frigate on 28 May and her prize crew was attempting to sail her into Boston. The British ships re-took Atalanta and sent her to Halifax, Nova Scotia.

Assurance continued an active month by capturing the American 10-gun privateer Rattlesnake on 17 June. During this period she also re-took the merchant brig Neptune; Cumming placed a prize crew on board the vessel and sent it to Martinique, but on 24 June she encountered the American privateer Young Cromwell and was captured again, the ten members of Assurance's crew becoming prisoners of war. Patrolling to the west of Halifax, on 20 September the ship then took the American privateer sloop Greyhound. Again in Boston Bay on 12 October, Assurance re-captured the merchant brigantine Poole as her prize crew sailed her towards the port, having captured her off Lisbon. She then re-captured the merchant sloop Europia, which had been captured by an American letter of marque the day before, on 20 October.

Also in late October, Assurance re-captured the merchant schooner Ann after an eight-hour chase; she had been captured by an American privateer while attempting to sail in to New York. Cumming was replaced by Captain William Swiney towards the end of the year. The ship continued on the North America Station, serving off New York under the orders of Rear-Admiral Robert Digby. During this period Assurance captured three other ships; the brig Adventure, schooner Salisbury, and sloop Phoenix. Digby also used Assurance as his flagship in April 1782, writing orders from the vessel. On 23 May the British decided to evacuate their positions at Savannah, Georgia. Assurance was at the time at Charlestown, and Swiney was put in command of the naval part of the evacuation. Thirty-four transport ships arrived on 20 June for the operation, and Swiney's fleet reached the Savannah River in early July. Fortifications were constructed on Tybee Island to house troops waiting to depart, and the evacuation began on 11 July.

Alongside the troops, which were sent to Jamaica, there were 3,100 Loyalists and 3,500 Black slaves. Over the next three weeks Swiney coordinated transports that took the population and garrison of Savannah to New York, St Augustine, and Jamaica. The last ship sailed on 24 July, leaving over 5,000 people un-embarked and expected to make their own ways to St Augustine. Towards the start of 1783 Swiney was taken ill and command was temporarily given to the first lieutenant of Assurance, Lieutenant Thomas Williams. The ship was sent out on patrol for several months, during which time Williams found success in prize-taking, capturing a number of vessels. On 20 January Assurance shared in the capture of the American brigs Unity and Betsey alongside the 14-gun sloop HMS Hound, 32-gun frigate HMS Cerberus, 26-gun frigate HMS Hussar, and 18-gun sloop HMS Mentor. Returning to New York in April, Digby promoted Williams to commander and gave him command of the 20-gun ship HMS Rhinoceros. Assurance continued serving in North America until the end of the war, returning to Britain to be paid off in February 1784.

=== Troop ship ===
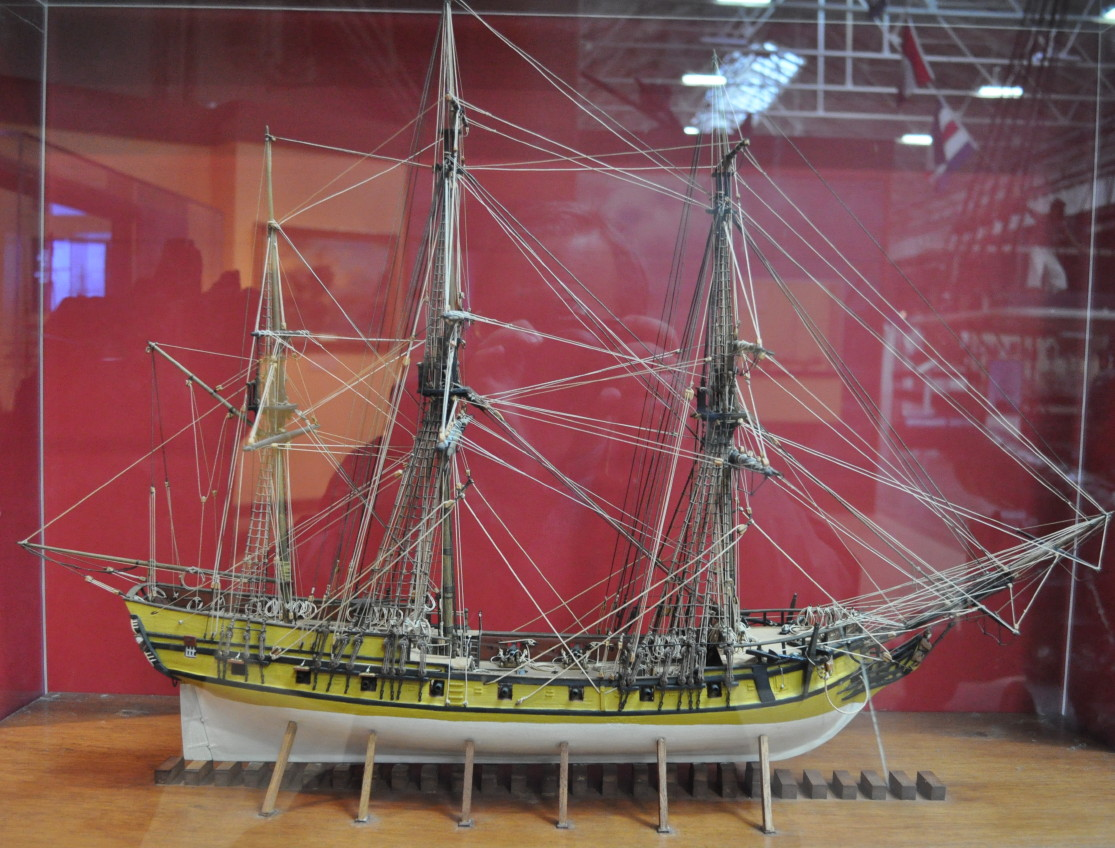
The American privateer Rattlesnake was captured by Assurance on 17 June 1781

Laid up at Sheerness Dockyard, Assurance was repaired between March and October 1785 at a cost of £8,578, but was not immediately put back into service. She was finally recommissioned in February 1791 under the command of Commander John Shortland. Intended for use as a troop ship, she underwent conversion at Chatham Dockyard which was completed in April. This work cost a further £2,692. Any change in armament at this stage is not recorded, but as troop ships Roebuck-class ships had a crew complement of 155.

While Assurance was undergoing this work and preparing for service her second lieutenant, Lieutenant Jahleel Brenton, was sent ashore at Rochester, Kent, to search for several deserters from the ship. There the locals came under the misapprehension that Brenton was there to press them into Assurance and a mob formed, after which Brenton and four midshipmen with him were arrested. The mayor had the five officers committed to the local jail; as they were escorted through Rochester the mob attacked them, knocking Brenton to the ground and stealing most of his clothes. The officers were released the following morning, and Brenton reported the event to the Admiralty which then prosecuted the mayor. Brenton was released from service in Assurance in order that he could stay in Britain for the trial, which subsequently condemned the mayor to pay a penalty of £750. In the meantime Assurance had sailed for Halifax, having embarked soldiers and stores on board on 11 May. She returned to Britain later in the year, being paid off again in December.

=== French Revolutionary Wars ===
Assurance saw no further service until the French Revolutionary Wars began. In April 1793 the ship was recommissioned by Captain Velters Cornewall Berkeley. Two months later her armament underwent a refit, with the ship now carrying twenty-two 24-pounder carronades on the lower deck and twenty 12-pounder long guns on the upper deck, accompanied by four more carronades on the quarterdeck and two on the forecastle. This restored her to service as a frigate.

Berkeley sailed Assurance to serve in the Mediterranean Sea in February 1794, but stayed there only briefly, moving to the West Indies Station to join Vice-Admiral Sir John Jervis' fleet. Jervis was undertaking a campaign to capture enemy-held islands, and in March Assurance joined the fleet as in undertook the invasion of Martinique. On 17 March boats from the ship joined with boats from the rest of the fleet to attack French shipping anchored in Fort Royal Bay, which resulted in the capture of the French 32-gun frigate Bienvenue, which was one of only two enemy warships based at Martinique. For this action surviving members of Assurance's crew were eligible for the "17 Mar. Boat Service 1794" clasp to the Naval General Service Medal, which was issued in 1849. With British soldiers having fought through the island, Martinique surrendered on 22 March. The fleet sailed on to St Lucia on 31 March, arriving the following day. Landings were again made, and the island's governor surrendered on 4 April.

Having spent several days at Martinique rejuvenating his force, Jervis set out to invade Guadeloupe on 8 April. Landings were again successfully made with Grande-Terre captured on 12 April. Assurance arrived at the island after this, and Basse-Terre fell to the British on 20 April. The marine contingent of Assurance formed part of a naval battalion that fought on Grande-Terre; two of her marines were killed, with a further three wounded including the lieutenant of marines. During these operations Assurance was one of three warships used to provide water and supplies to the camps ashore. The expedition departed the island after installing a British governor.

A scene from the battle of Martinique in which Assurance participated

Staying in the West Indies after the campaign, Assurance underwent a series of changes in command. Lieutenant Charles Ogle was appointed acting captain of Assurance in May, departing when he received promotion to commander later in the same month. When resistance flared up again on Guadeloupe, Assurance was part of the force that returned to support fresh landings by the army on 19 June, with the ship again running supplies ashore. Fighting was still ongoing on 5 October when Assurance, stationed at Petit-Bourg, was fired upon by several French gunboats at Pointe-à-Pitre. One cannonball smashed through her cabins, killing the convalescent Major Robert Irving, the army's deputy quartermaster general.

Naval historian Rif Winfield reports that Commander Wyndham Bryer assumed command in December, but historians David Syrett and R. L. DiNardo state that Bryer died on 23 October. The British, outnumbered and badly understrength on Guadeloupe, evacuated the island on 10 December. Captain Charles Sawyer joined Assurance in April 1795, and it was under his command that the ship returned to Britain, being paid off at Sheerness in September the same year.

=== Transport Board ===
Laid up at Chatham, in February 1796 Assurance began conversion work to become a troop ship again. This cost £7,008 and was completed in July, prior to which on 8 June the ship was transferred to serve under the auspices of the Transport Board. In her new capacity Assurance was re-armed, with sixteen 9-pounder long guns on her upper deck, four 6-pounders on the quarterdeck, and a further two on the forecastle.

Recommissioned in July under the command of Lieutenant John Norris, Assurance sailed to the Mediterranean Sea one month later. Norris was replaced by Commander Ranceford Tookey on 6 December, and sometime subsequent to this the ship returned to the West Indies. In August 1798 she formed part of a large convoy travelling from Martinique back to Britain. The convoy went through a large storm on 23 August, during which the 16-gun store ship HMS Etrusco was dismasted. The ship had already been in bad repair with rotten timbers causing several leaks, and she was now forced to sail under a jury rig, struggling to keep up with the convoy. On 25 August the commander of Etrusco received permission to abandon his ship as unseaworthy, and the crew was taken on board by Assurance and the 14-gun sloop HMS Beaver before Etrusco was scuttled.

Assurance arrived in Britain in October, and in March the following year was fitted as a receiving ship at Woolwich Dockyard for £1,695. The ship remained at Woolwich, in ordinary, until she was broken up there in March 1815.
