= Anthony Hunt (Royal Navy officer, died 1798) =

Royal Navy officer (died 1798)

Captain Anthony Hunt
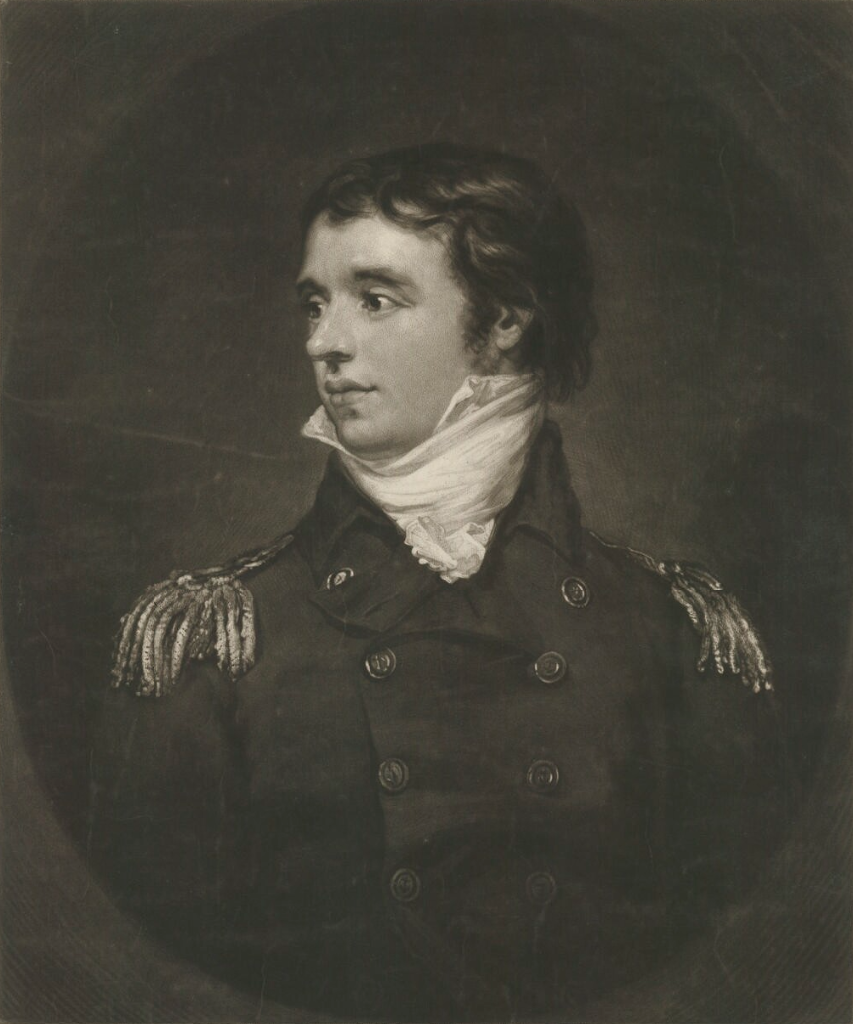
- Likeness engraved by S. W. Reynolds after James Northcote, 1797
- Died: 1798
- Military career
- Allegiance: Great Britain
- Branch: Royal Navy
- Service years: 1789–1798
- Rank: Captain
- Commands: HMS Tisiphone; HMS Amphitrite; HMS Concorde; HMS Virginie
- Conflicts: French Revolutionary Wars

Captain Anthony Hunt (died 1798) was a post-captain in the Royal Navy who died young. He served as midshipman in the Carnatic in August 1789 and was shortly thereafter commissioned lieutenant. He was promoted post-captain in 1791, and appointed to the Amphitrite, which was wrecked under his command in late 1793. In 1796 he was promoted from the Concorde to the Virginie, and in her carried the Earl of Mornington on his passage to India. Arriving in Madras early in 1798, Hunt soon caught a violent fever and died.

== Life ==
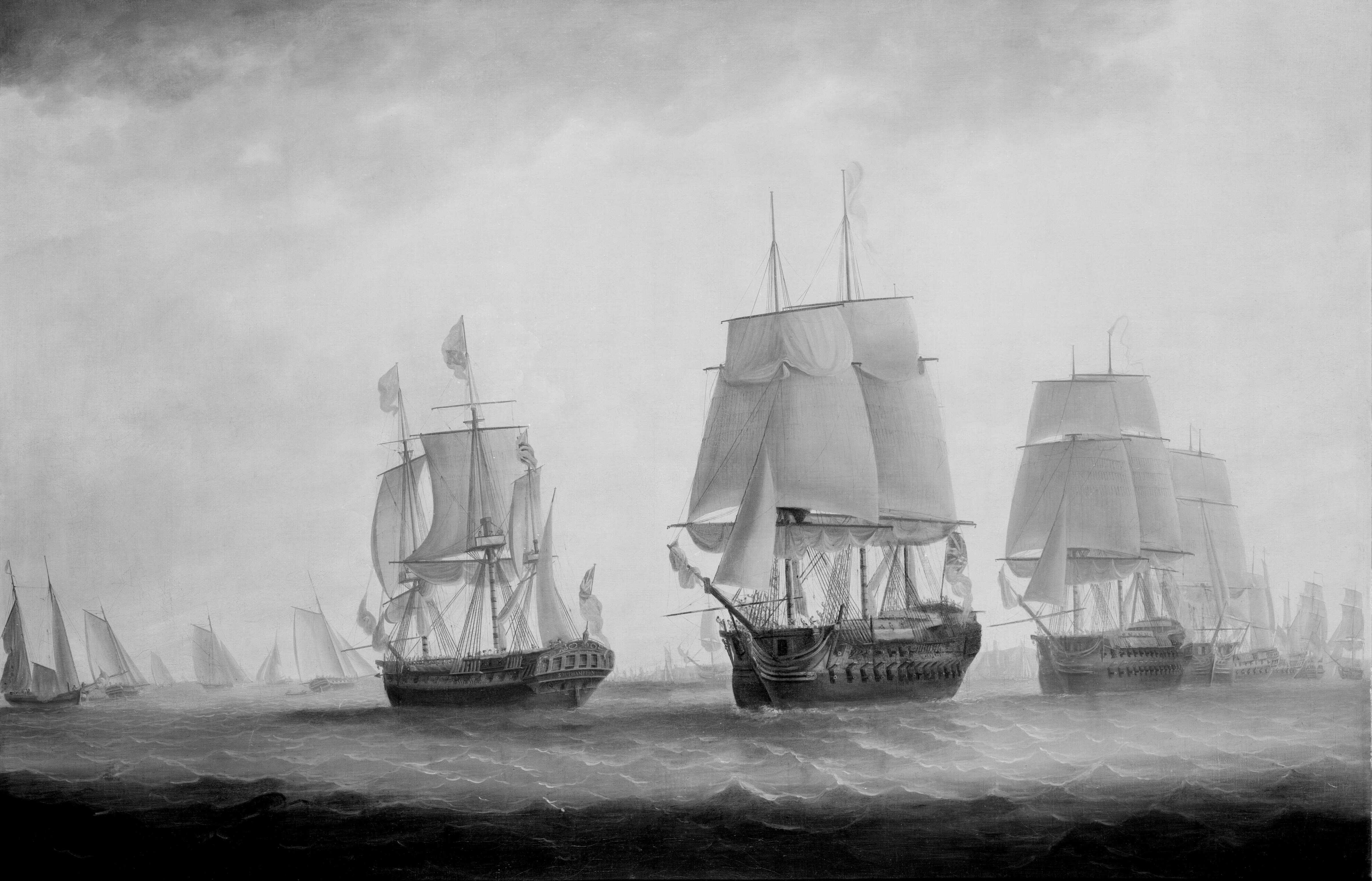
George III reviewing the fleet off Plymouth, 18 August 1789 (Note: The Carnatic is shown just right of the centre of the picture, heading the line of ships being reviewed.)

This officer was a midshipman on board the Carnatic of 74 guns, at Plymouth, in August 1789, and was included in the promotions made after the visit paid by the royal family to that place, his lieutenant's commission being signed on 26 August.

He served some time in the Helena sloop, under Captain James Kempthorne; he was appointed commander on 22 November 1790, and had the Tisiphone of 12 guns given him.

Being made post-captain in 1791, he commanded the Amphitrite of 24 guns, and soon after sailed for the Mediterranean in one of the frigates belonging to Lord Hood's fleet. Towards the end of 1793, his ship was wrecked by striking on a sunken rock, but himself and the crew were saved.

Being returned to England, he was, in 1795, appointed to La Concorde of 36 guns, and for some time formed one of the squadron of frigates under the command of Sir J. B. Warren, off the coast of France. In 1796 he was promoted from the Concorde to the Virginie of 44 guns, a French ship recently captured by the British, then refitting at Plymouth. He sailed in her from thence in November 1796, and, after several cruises in the English Channel, was ordered in June 1797 to sail from Portsmouth to Harwich to take the Princess of Wurtemburgh to Cuxhaven. The squadron was composed of the Revolutionnaire of 44 guns, under Captain Francis Cole, commodore; La Virginie of 44 guns, under Captain Anthony Hunt; and the Melampus of 36 guns, under Captain Graham Moore.

On his return to Portsmouth in the Virginie, he was appointed to carry the Earl of Mornington and his suite to India: contrary winds for some weeks delayed his departure, but at length he sailed from St. Helens and quitted his native country never to return. During his passage to India Hunt was apparently chased by a large French ship, but by lightening his frigate which was a fast sailer, he soon lost sight of an enemy which appeared so far superior in force, (Note: But cf. other sources.) and landed Lord Mornington at his new government of Bengal. The Virginie arrived at Madras in April 1798, almost immediately after which the young officer Hunt caught a violent fever which proved fatal. An obituary printed in the Naval Chronicle in 1799 concluded, "He has left all who knew his worth to lament his untimely fate."

== Gallery ==
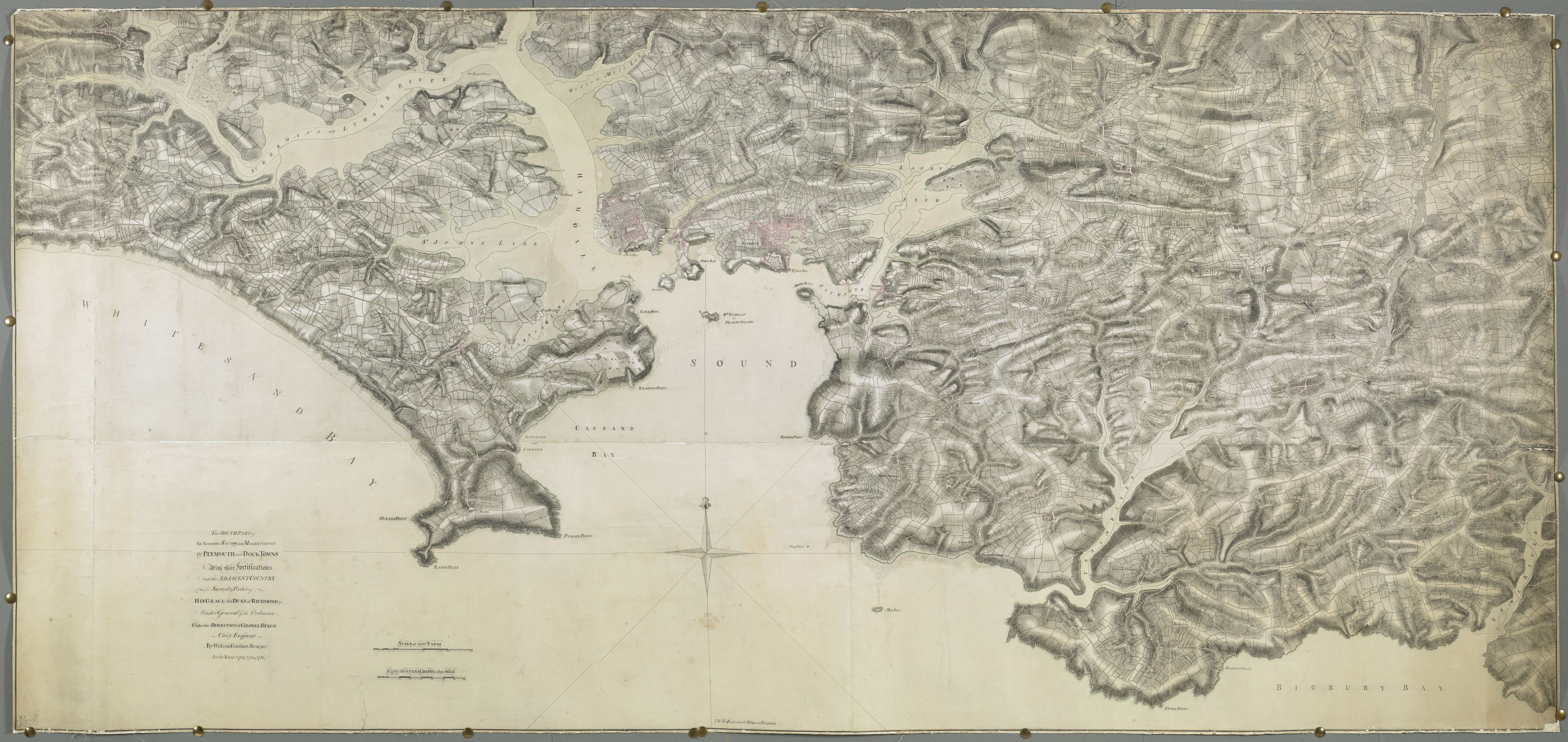
Survey of Plymouth and Dock Towns, 1784–1786

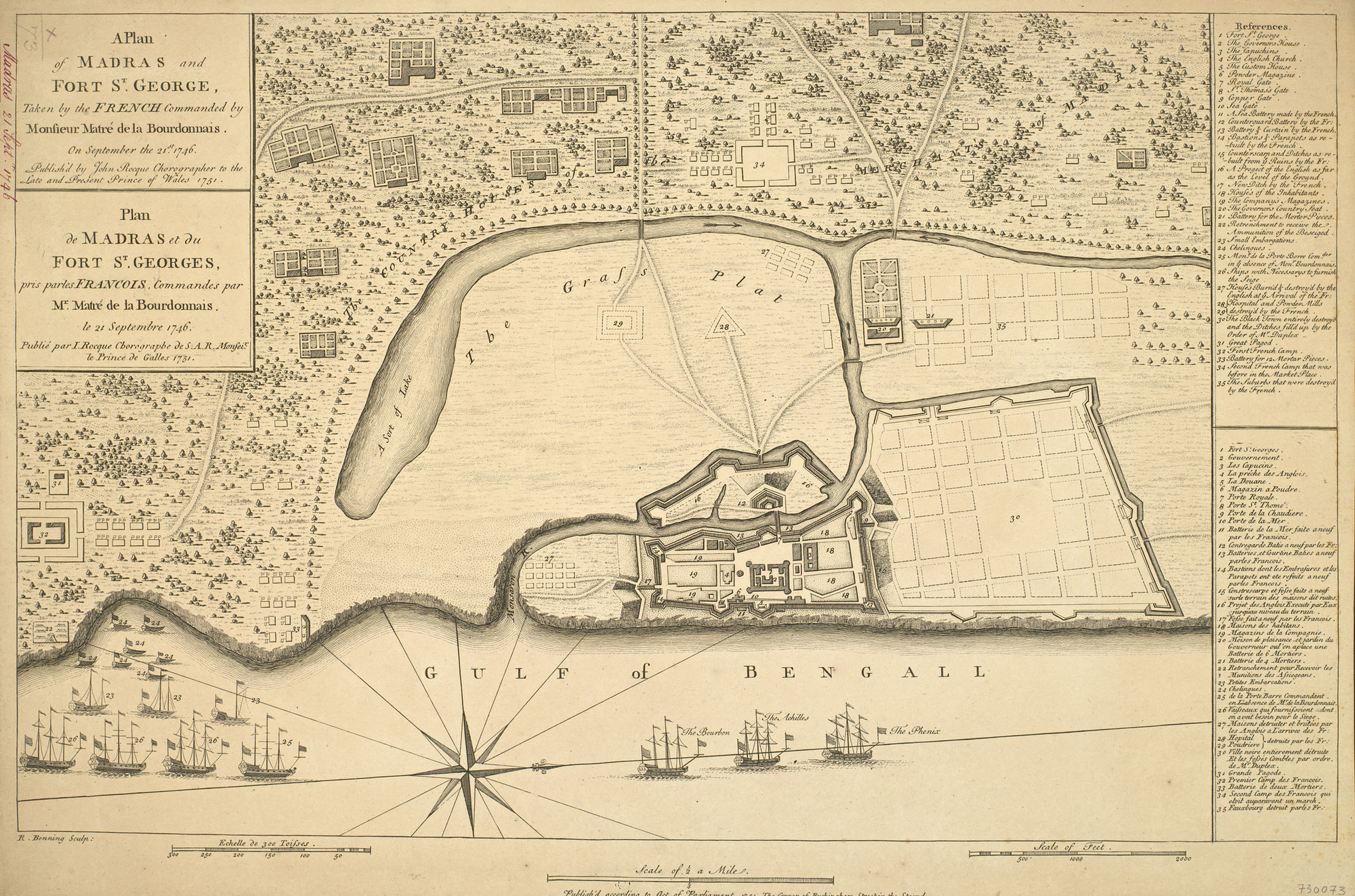
Plan of Madras and Fort St. George, 1746

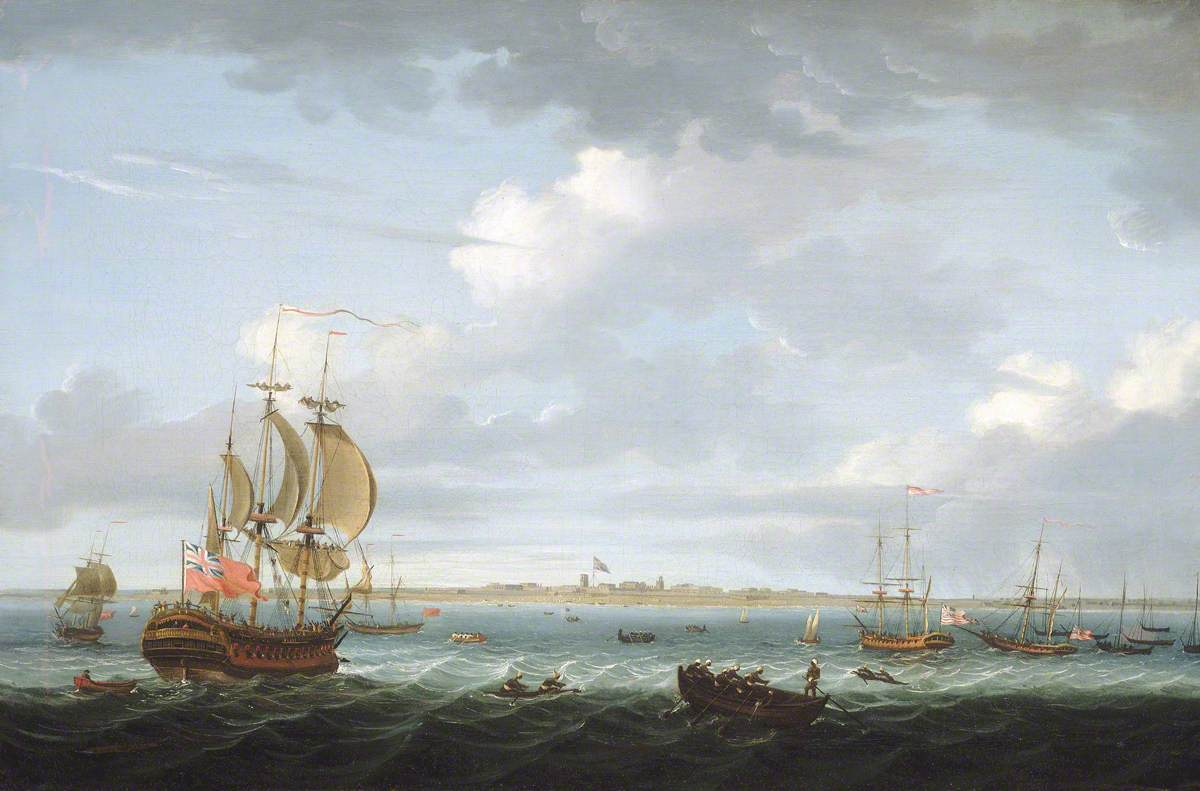
Shipping off Madras, 1780

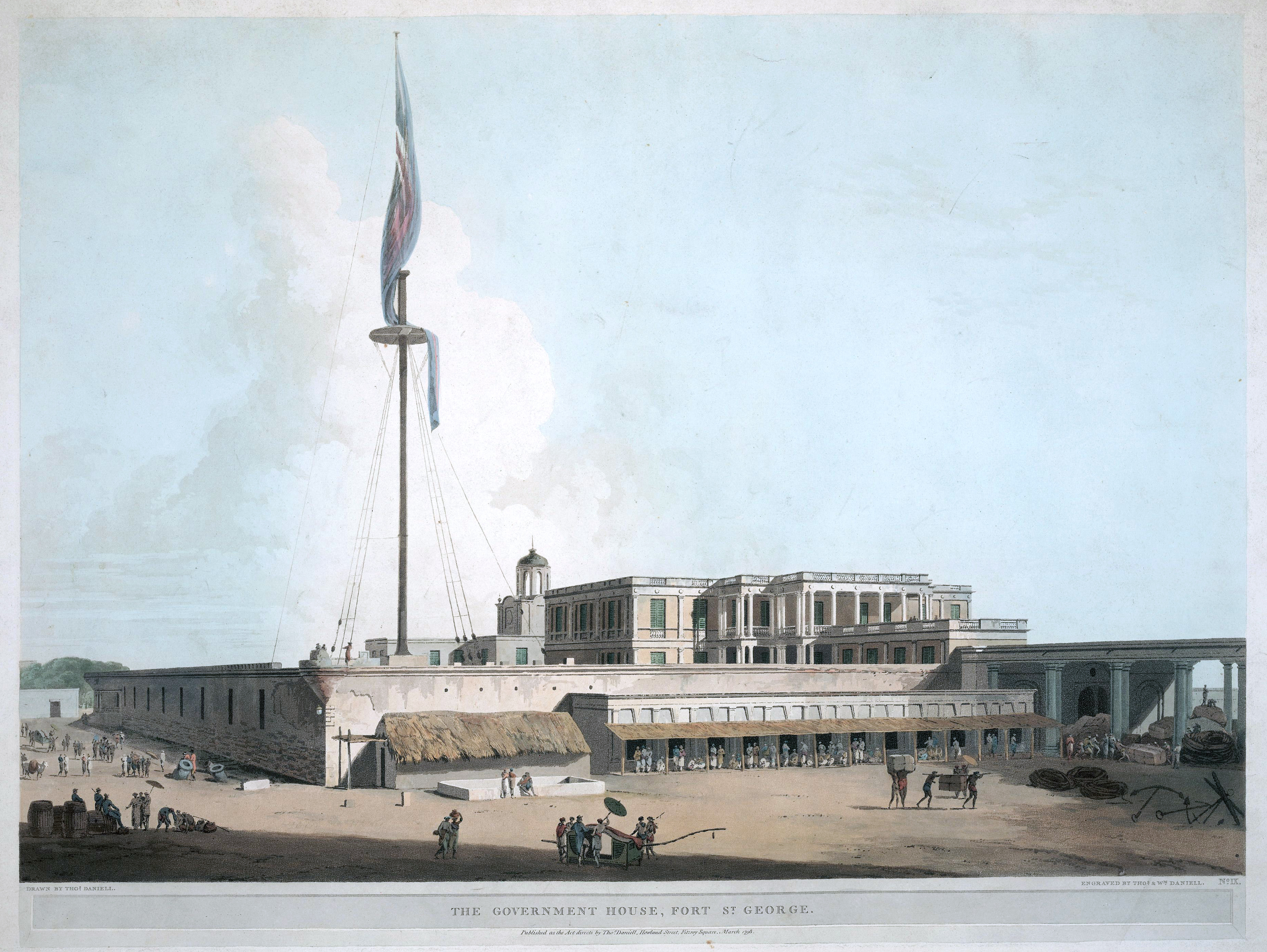
The Government House, Fort St. George, 1798

== Sources ==
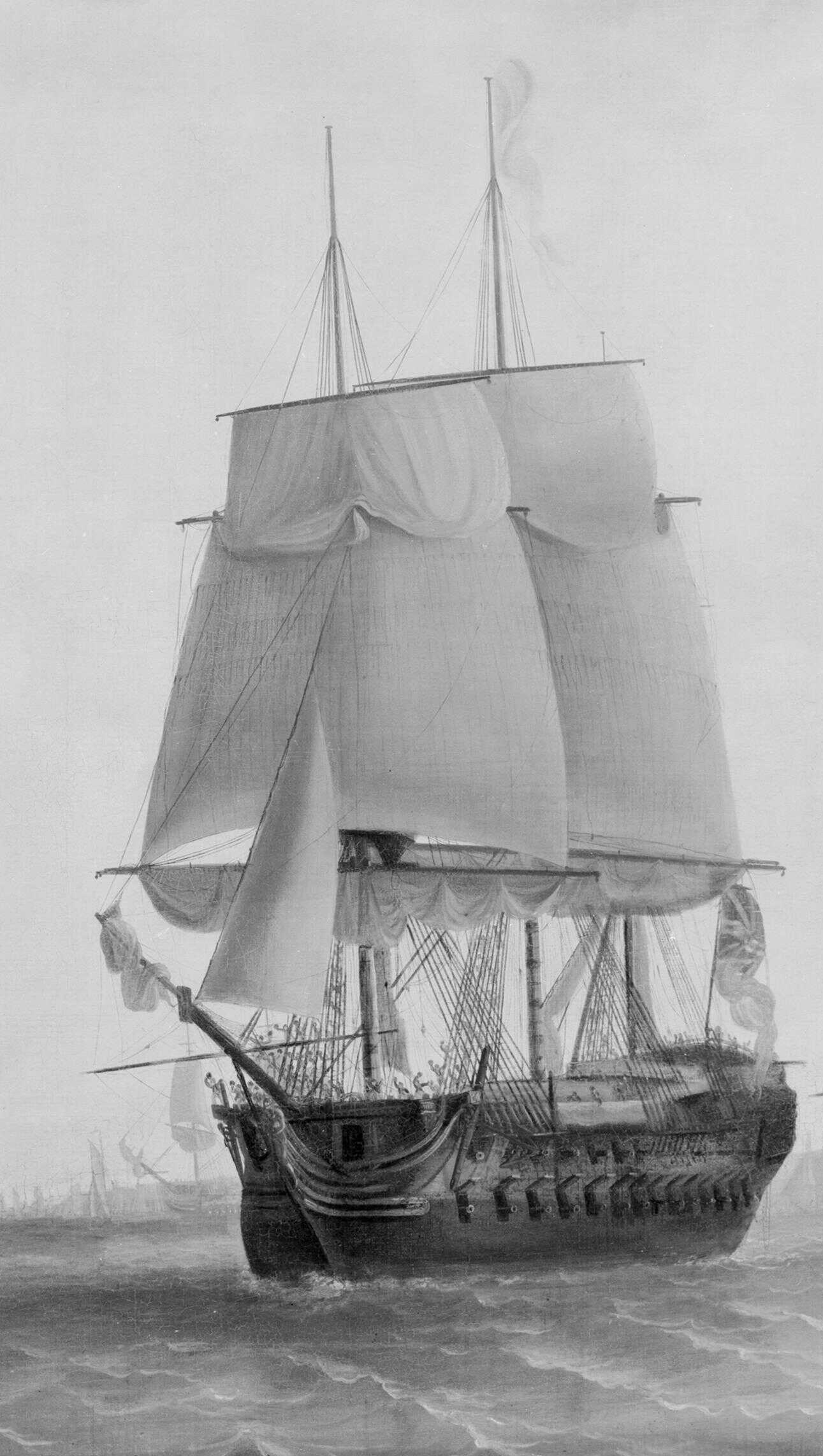
Carnatic off Plymouth, 18 August 1789 (detail)

- Hepper, David J. (1994). British Warship Losses in the Age of Sail, 1650–1859. Rotherfield: Jean Boudriot.
- Winfield, Rif (2007). British Warships in the Age of Sail: Design, Construction, Careers and Fates. Great Britain: Seaforth Publishing.
- "George III in HMS Southampton reviewing the fleet off Plymouth, 18 August 1789" (BHC0460). Royal Museums Greenwich. Retrieved 14 February 2023.
- "Postscript / East Indies". The Aberdeen Journal. 27 August 1798. p. 4.
- "Saturday's Post / From the London Papers, Aug. 22". The Edinburgh Advertiser. 28 August 1798. p. 1.

Attribution:

- "Obituary / Captain Anthony Hunt". The Naval Chronicle. Vol. 1. London: Burney & Gold, January–June 1799.
