= John Peck (naval architect) =

American merchant and naval architect

John Peck (June 12, 1725 Boston – May 3, 1790 Boston) was an American merchant and naval architect of the 18th century. He had been trained as a merchant, and as apprentice in that matter had served at sea as supercargo for a few voyages. Having become interested in naval architecture while studying mathematics in school, the experiences of observing ships at sea furthered that interest. It would appear, however, that his designing of ships was more of a hobby, compared to his main trade as a successful merchant. Additionally, he was appointed inspector of saltpeter in Watertown, Massachusetts, around the time the American Revolution started.

John Peck was married to Hannah Jackson, died 1770, with whom he had a son, William, born in 1763.

== Designing ships ==
Peck's son stated that Peck Sr. never had laid eyes on drawings of ships, but developed his own method to draw plans. The same source admits that these plans later on were close to unintelligible even to Peck Sr. himself, and states that his father only ever owned one book on ship building, although probably not when the first ships of his design and ideas were being built.

Most of Peck's ships were built at yards, in Boston, Plymouth and Newburyport. One was built abroad (Maréchal de Cartries), two on his own land, with a few of the others under his direct supervision in a private ship yard in Plymouth. For the majority, Peck served as naval architect, but he was not a shipwright. This distinguishes him from the other ship-designers of his time, and makes him the first naval architect of the United States, insofar as the term is understood for one who draws ships, but is not a shipwright or -builder as well. In designing ships, Peck appears to have had his own ideas, supported by the building of the Minerva as a means to evaluating them. According to Howard I. Chapelle, he was "secretive, egotistical and easily discouraged," but was a "very clever designer," his ships being reputed as fast, handy, and able to carry a large press of sail.

In 1774, Peck had a ship built to test his own ideas on ship design. Minerva, of about 20 - 30 tons, was exceptionally broad compared to other ships of that time, but proved to be a fast and seaworthy vessel. When he learned that the Massachusetts legislature wanted to build ships-of-war, he submitted plans and proposals and was granted approval. One ship built thus was the brig, or brigantine, Hazard, with sixteen guns, that was constructed in Boston. This ship proved to be a very fast vessel, but her career ended short when she was burned during the Penobscot expedition. Another ship by Peck Sr. was the privateer Belisarius. Being intended for that particular trade, she too was to be fast, a goal achieved according to Joshua Humphreys, who is quoted by Chapelle as saying that she was one of the fastest sailing ships at sea. According to Humphreys, she was spelled Bellesarius and of 110-foot (34 m) length, with a breadth of 30 feet (9.1 m). Belisarius was captured in 1781 by the British after, as Peck claimed, she had been sent out to sea without sweeps and was caught in a calm. She served in the Royal Navy as a 20-gun ship.

A better-known Peck design was Empress of China, the first American ship to arrive at China under the new flag of the equally new nation. Owned by Robert Morris, and others, of Philadelphia, she was built in Boston in 1783. Despite being a rather full ship, she had a reputation for being a fast sailer.

Maréchal de Castries was a ship of 390 tons, built about 1781–1783 in France as an East Indiaman packet. She has the distinction of being the first ship built abroad to American plans.

One ship that was probably, but not with certainty, built to his design was the large privateer Rattlesnake which later in the Royal Navy was known as a fast ship as well. According to Chapelle, she was built in Plymouth while Peck was there as well to supervise the construction of the Continental packet-ketch Mercury. Rattlesnake's lines differ from Belisarius, so it might be possible he was experimenting with the design.

Around 1785, possibly earlier, Peck went to Portsmouth, or perhaps Kittery in Maine across the river, where he operated a small shipyard. In 1790, he fell ill and, by doing of his son, went back to Boston where he died in May of the same year.
