= Belisarius (1781 ship) =

History

Massachusetts
- Name: Belisarius
- Namesake: Belisarius
- Owner: William & John Shatttuck, Boston
- Launched: 1781
- Captured: 7 August 1781

Great Britain
- Name: HMS Bellisarius
- Acquired: 26 August 1781 by purchase of a prize
- Fate: Sold 2 December 1783

Great Britain
- Name: Bellisarius
- Acquired: 1783 by purchase
- Fate: Wrecked 2 September 1787

General characteristics
- Tons burthen: 440, or 48726/94 (bm)
- Length: Overall: 118 ft 9 in (36.2 m); Keel: 100 ft 8 in (30.7 m)
- Beam: 30 ft 2 in (9.2 m)
- Depth of hold: 15 ft 0 in (4.6 m)
- Complement: Privateer: 147; Royal Navy: 140
- Armament: Privateer: 20 × 9-pounder guns; Royal Navy: 20 × 9-pounder guns + 4 smaller

Belisarius was launched in Massachusetts in 1781. The British Royal Navy captured later that year and took her into service as HMS Bellisarius. She captured several American privateers, including one in a single ship action, before the Navy sold her in 1783. Her new owners sailed her as a merchantman between London and British Honduras. In 1787, she carried emigrants to Sierra Leone for the Committee for the Relief of the Black Poor, before returning to trading with Honduras. She was wrecked in September 1787.

== Privateer ==
Belisarius was a privateer built by "Mr. Paul", launched in 1781, and fitted at Boston. She was a fast, miniature frigate or quarterdeck sloop. On 6 May 1781, she sailed on her first cruise.

In July, Belisarius sailed in company with Aurora, but the two ships separated.

Belisarius was under the command of Captain James Munro, when HMS Medea captured her on 7 August 1781, off the Delaware River. She was described as "a very fast-sailing Frigate of 26 Guns and 147 Men, belonging to Salem." Amphitrite and Savage shared in the capture. Reportedly, the privateer Virginia also participated in the capture.

Belisarius arrived at New York City of 12 August.

== HMS Bellisarius ==
The Royal Navy purchased Belisarius and commissioned her as the sixth rate HMS Bellisarius on 29 August 1781, under Captain Richard Graves.

In late 1781 or January 1782, Bellisarius captured the 12-gun Venus, off Boston.

On 13 March 1782, Bellisarius and Pandora captured the sloop Louis, bound to Virginia, taken off the Capes of Virginia. She was carrying cyder and onions.

On 21 April, Bellisarius captured the brig Fox, bound to Havana, off Cape Hattrass. Fox was carrying a cargo of flour.

On 12 May, Bellisarius captured the privateer Chance, of Providence, Rhode Island, Daniel Ahorn, master, and 12 guns and 60 men.

On 18 May, Bellisarius captured the schooner Swordfish, which was carrying a cargo of flour and lumber. Swordfish, Charles Collins, master, was from Warren, Rhode Island.

On 18 May, Bellisarius captured the privateer Sampson, Captain David Brooks, of New London, and eighteen 6-pounder guns and 130 men.

On 3 June, Bellisarius and Quebec captured the privateer Pilgrim.

On 8 July, Bellisarius, Bonetta, and the privateer Tyger captured the galley Comte de Grasse. Comte de Grasse had been sailing in ballast.

On 7 December, Bellisarius captured the brig Harlequin.

On 14 February 1783, Bellisarius captured the ship Tartar. Tartar was a privateer of twenty 9-pounder guns, under the command of Captain John Cathcart; earlier, she had belonged to the Massachusetts Navy. Tartar was sailing for Virginia and in company with another Massachusetts privateer, Alexander, Captain John Foster Williams, when they encountered Bellisarius. Both privateers attempted to flee, with Alexander, succeeding. Bellisarius caught up with Tartar at about 11p.m. and an exchange of broadsides began. After an hour-and-a-quarter, Cathcart struck. British casualties were three men killed and four wounded; American losses are unknown. Bellisarius put a prize crew aboard Tartar and the two vessels arrived at New York city on 28 February. The Vice admiralty court condemned Tartar and she was sold in mid-March.

Bellisarius arrived at Deptford on 10 October 1783, and was paid off in November. The Navy sold her at Deptford on 2 December, for £855.

== Merchantman ==
Bellisarius first appeared in Lloyd's Register (LR) in the volume for 1784.

Year	Master	Owner	Trade	Source & Notes
1784	L.O'Brien; Mayer	Montgomery	Honduras–London	LR

On 13 March 1784, Captain Lucius O'Brien sailed from Gravesend for the "Musquito Shore". He died on the voyage. On 6 October, Bellisarius, Mayor, master, arrived at Portsmouth from the Musquito Shore.

Year	Master	Owner	Trade	Source & Notes
1786	J.Armstrong	Montgomery	Honduras–London	LR; small repairs 1785
1787	J.Sill	Montgomery	Honduras–London	LR; small repairs 1785

In late 1786, in London the Committee for the Relief of the Black Poor chartered Bellisarius and two other vessels, Atlantic, and Vernon, to carry emigrants from London to what was to be a new settlement in Sierra Leone.

On 11 January 1787, Atlantic, Muirhead, master, and Belisarius, Sill, master sailed from Gravesend, bound for Sierra Leone. Vernon delayed leaving London to take on some more migrants, but then sailed to join the other two vessels and their escort at Portsmouth.

Bad weather forced them to divert to Plymouth, during which time about 50 passengers died. Another 24 were discharged, and 23 ran away. Eventually, with some more recruitment, 411 passengers sailed to Sierra Leone in April 1787.

Atlantic, Bellisarius, and Vernon, Gill, master, sailed from Portsmouth on 23 February, under escort by the sloop-of-war HMS Nautilous.

The four vessels were reported to have been safe at Tenerife on 24 April, and had been expected to sail to Sierra Leone that night. Ninety-six passengers died on the voyage from Portsmouth to Sierra Leone.

== Loss ==
On 2 September 1787, Bellisarius was driven ashore during a hurricane and wrecked at the mouth of the Belize River, British Honduras.
