= Empress of China (1783) =

Three-masted, square-rigged sailing ship of 360 tons

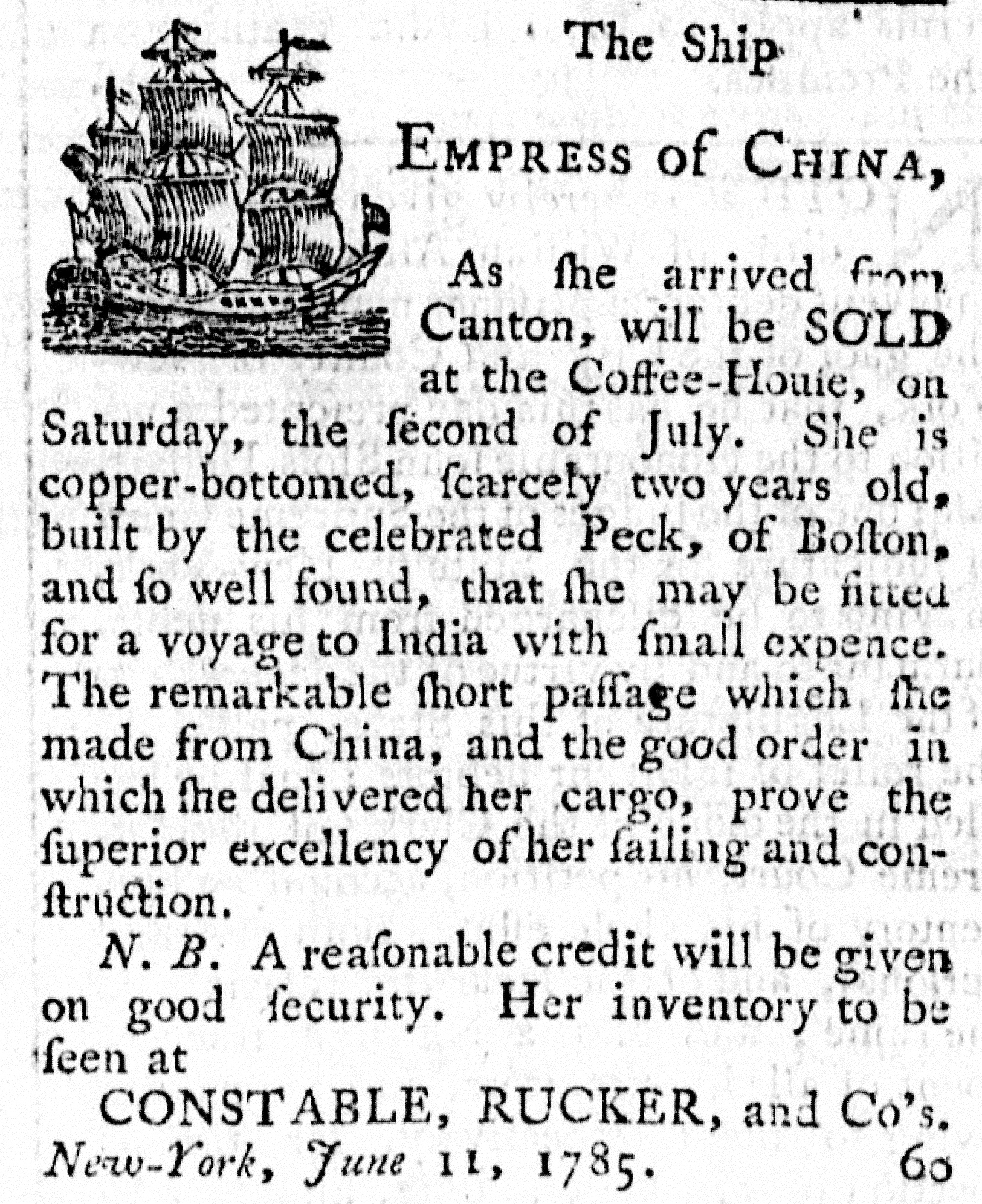
- 1785 advertisement in the New York Independent Journal for the selling of the Empress of China after her return from Canton

History

United States
- Name: Empress of China
- Builder: Mr. John Peck, Boston, U.S.
- Launched: 1783
- Fate: Sunk in the waters off Dublin, Ireland

General characteristics
- Tons burthen: 360 tons
- Sail plan: Full-rigged ship
- Complement: 34
- Armament: 4 × 6-pounder guns

Empress of China, also known as Chinese Queen, was a three-masted, square-rigged sailing ship of 360 tons, initially built in 1783 for service as a privateer. After the Treaty of Paris brought a formal end to the American Revolutionary War, the vessel was refitted for commercial purposes. She became the first American ship to sail from the newly independent United States to China, opening what is known today as the Old China Trade and transporting the first official representative of the American government to Canton.

== First voyage ==
The first American merchant vessel to enter Chinese waters left New York harbor on Washington's birthday, February 22, 1784. Empress of China returned to New York on May 11, 1785 after a round-trip voyage of 14 months and 24 days. The success of the voyage encouraged others to invest in further trading with China. President Washington bought a set of Chinese porcelain tableware from the ship.

The ship's captain, John Green (1736–1796), was a former U.S. Continental Navy officer, her two business agents (supercargos), Samuel Shaw (1754–1794) and Thomas Randall (1723–1797), were former officers in the U.S. Continental Army, and its syndicate of owners, including Robert Morris (1734–1806) and Colonel Samuel Selden Miles (1739-1805), were some of the richest men in the new nation.

== Legacy ==
- In 1986, China minted a silver 5-yuan to commemorate the voyage of Empress of China.

== See also ==
- Foreign relations of Imperial China
- RMS Empress of China (1891)
- Columbia Rediviva
