= HMS Deal Castle (1756) =

Ship of the line of the Royal Navy

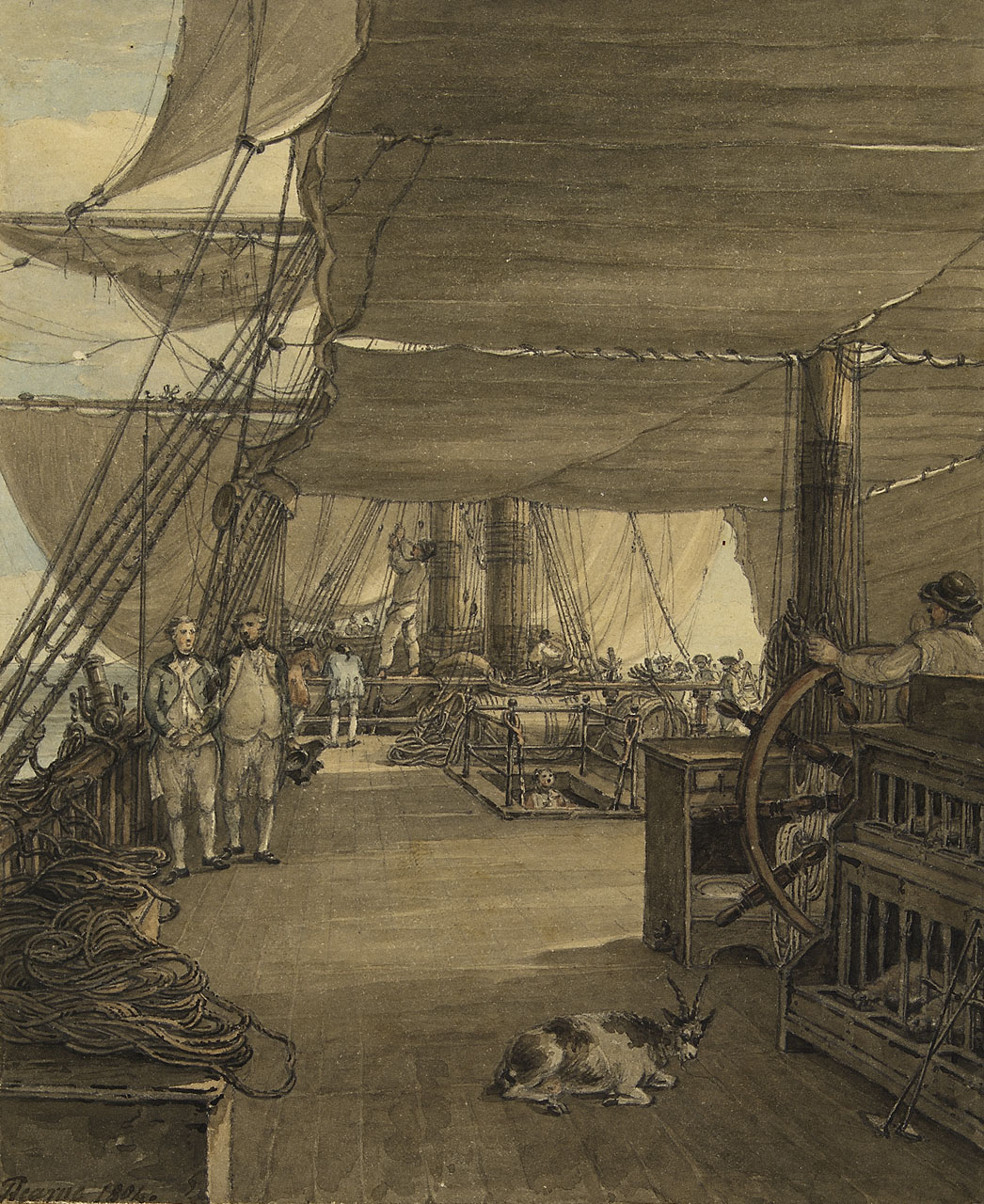
A scene on board the Deal Castle, Captain James Cumming, in a voyage from the West Indies in 1775

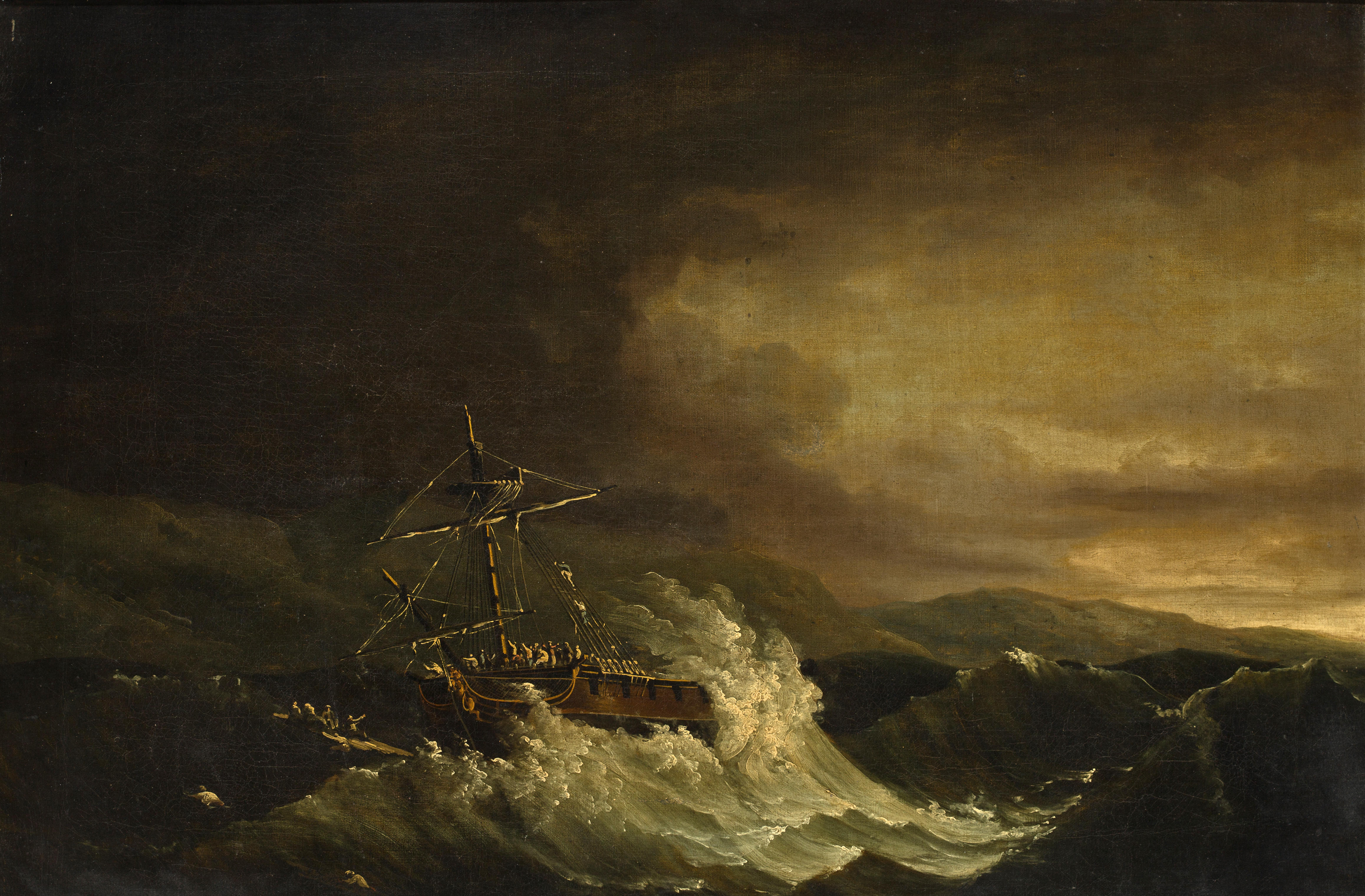
The wreck off Puerto Rico, in the hurricane of 1780 with the crew escaping on a raft

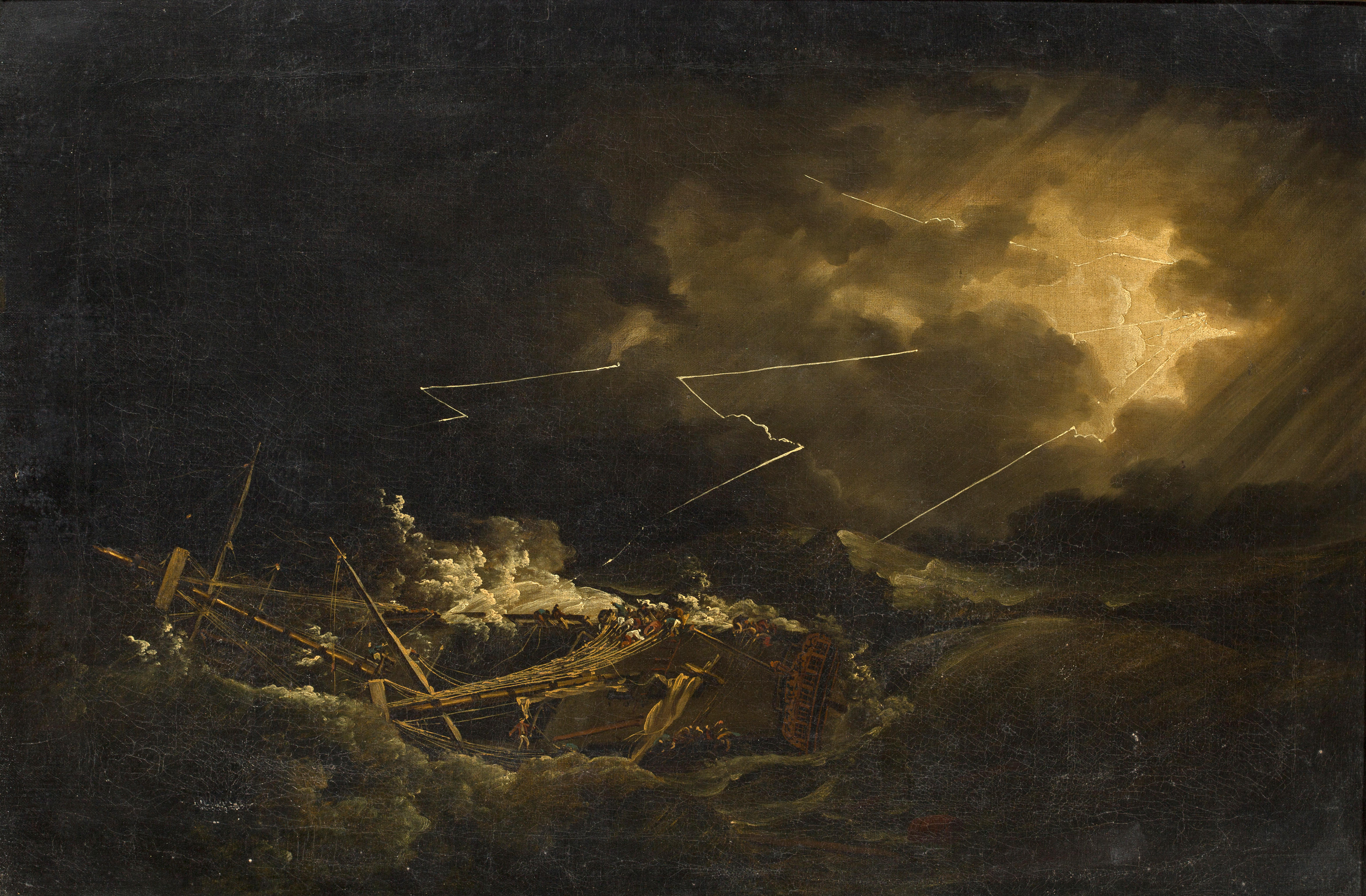
The wreck of the Deal Castle by John Thomas Serres

HMS Deal Castle was a 20-gun post ship of the Royal Navy built in 1756.

== Service ==
Commissioned in 1754, she was built at Blackwall and fitted out in Deptford 1755/56 by Adam Hayes and launched on 20 January 1756. Her first Captain was Edward Hughes. Fitting out was completed in March, and she then plied the English Channel and North Sea. Her first action was on 18 July 1760 when she captured the French privateer Le Faucon.

In 1762, she escorted a convoy of troop carriers to Senegal and saw brief action with the French ship Le Signe. She was recommissioned in 1763 under command of Captain Digby Dent and saw three years of service in the Mediterranean including a diplomatic trip to Cádiz.

From 1766 to 1768, she was repaired and recommissioned at Chatham Docks. She was relaunched in April 1768 and went to North America. She was refitted again in 1772 and, in April 1773, went to the Leeward Islands returning to England in 1775. In 1776, she was recommissioned and refitted at Portsmouth to serve in Newfoundland. This was changed in 1777, and in December she returned to the Leeward Islands again.

On 17 April 1780, she took part in the Battle of Martinique under command of Captain William Fooks with Admiral George Rodney. Fooks moved to HMS Greyhound the day after the battle, and James Hawkins-Whitshed took command.

The ship was wrecked in the Great Hurricane of 1780 off the coast of Puerto Rico on 11 October 1780 (along with 12 other Royal Navy vessels), but only three of the 160 crew perished. Hawkins-Whitshed took over HMS Ceres. 22,000 persons were killed in the storm.
