= HMS Etrusco =

History

United States
- Name: President Washington
- Builder: Rhode Island
- Launched: 1789
- Fate: Sold 1791 at Calcutta

Grand Duchy of Tuscany
- Name: Etrusco
- Owner: Home Riggs Popham
- Acquired: 1791 by purchase
- Fate: Seized c.1793

Great Britain
- Name: Etrusco
- Owner: Home Riggs Popham
- Fate: Sold to the government 1794

Great Britain
- Name: HMS Etrusco
- Acquired: 1794 by purchase
- Fate: Abandoned at sea 15 August 1798

General characteristics
- Tons burthen: 919, or 999 (bm)
- Length: Overall: 137 ft 8 in (42.0 m); Keel: 116 ft 5 7/8 in (35.5 m)
- Beam: 38 ft 6 in (11.7 m)
- Depth of hold: 13 ft 6 in (4.1 m)
- Propulsion: Sail
- Complement: 125
- Armament: 16 × 6-pounder guns

HMS Etrusco was launched in 1789 at Rhode Island as President Washington. Home Riggs Popham purchased her at Calcutta and transferred to her the name and papers of a previous vessel of his named Etrusco, a Tuscan ship.

== Career ==
Merchantman: Between 1787 and 1793 Popham was engaged in a series of commercial ventures in the Eastern Sea, sailing for the Imperial Ostend Company. During this time he took several surveys and rendered some services to the British East India Company, which were officially acknowledged.

In December 1791 he purchased at Calcutta and fitted out an American ship, President Washington, at a cost of about £20,000. He named his purchase Etrusco, transferring to President Washington the name and papers of his previous ship. She therefore sailed under the flag of the Duke of Tuscany.

Popham sailed Etrusco to China and took on board a cargo valued at £50,000, the property of himself and two merchants, apparently French. He also took on the freight charge, which he valued at £40,000. Etrusco arrived at Ostend in July 1793, where the English frigate HMS Brilliant seized her and then brought her back to England. (Note: The only prize money announcement gives her captor as the hired armed cutter Grace.)

Etrusco was claimed as a prize for having French property on board, and condemned as a droit of admiralty for infringing the British East India Company's (EIC) monopoly by bringing tea from China. (Note: Popham contended that he had rendered important services to the EIC and that the governor-general in council had sanctioned the voyage. The case was the subject of prolonged litigation. In 1805 Popham received a grant of £25,000 against his claim for £70,000, not including the heavy costs of the lawsuit.)

Etrusco first appeared in Lloyd's Register (LR) in 1794 with B. Georgi, master, Popham, owner, and trade Cork–Hamburg.

Royal Navy: The Admiralty purchased Etrusco in 1794. Commander James Hanson commissioned her as HMS Etrusco in May 1795; she was registered on 29 June 1795. Commander George Reynolds replaced Hanson in September 1797.

== Loss ==
Etrusco was part of a convoy from Martinique to England when a storm on 23 July 1798 dismasted her completely. Her timbers were already in a poor state before she had left the West Indies and after the storm and the loss of her masts she was now leaking. She progressed under jury rig but on 15 August, the transfer of the last of her crew to HMS Assurance and Beaver was complete. Commander Reynolds fired three of her 6-pounder guns downwards through her bottom to scuttle her and then left her.

Lloyd's List reported that the armed ship Etrusco, from the West Indies, had foundered on 25 August in a gale of wind but that her crew had been saved.
