= Samuel Shaw (consul) =

American diplomat (1754–1794)

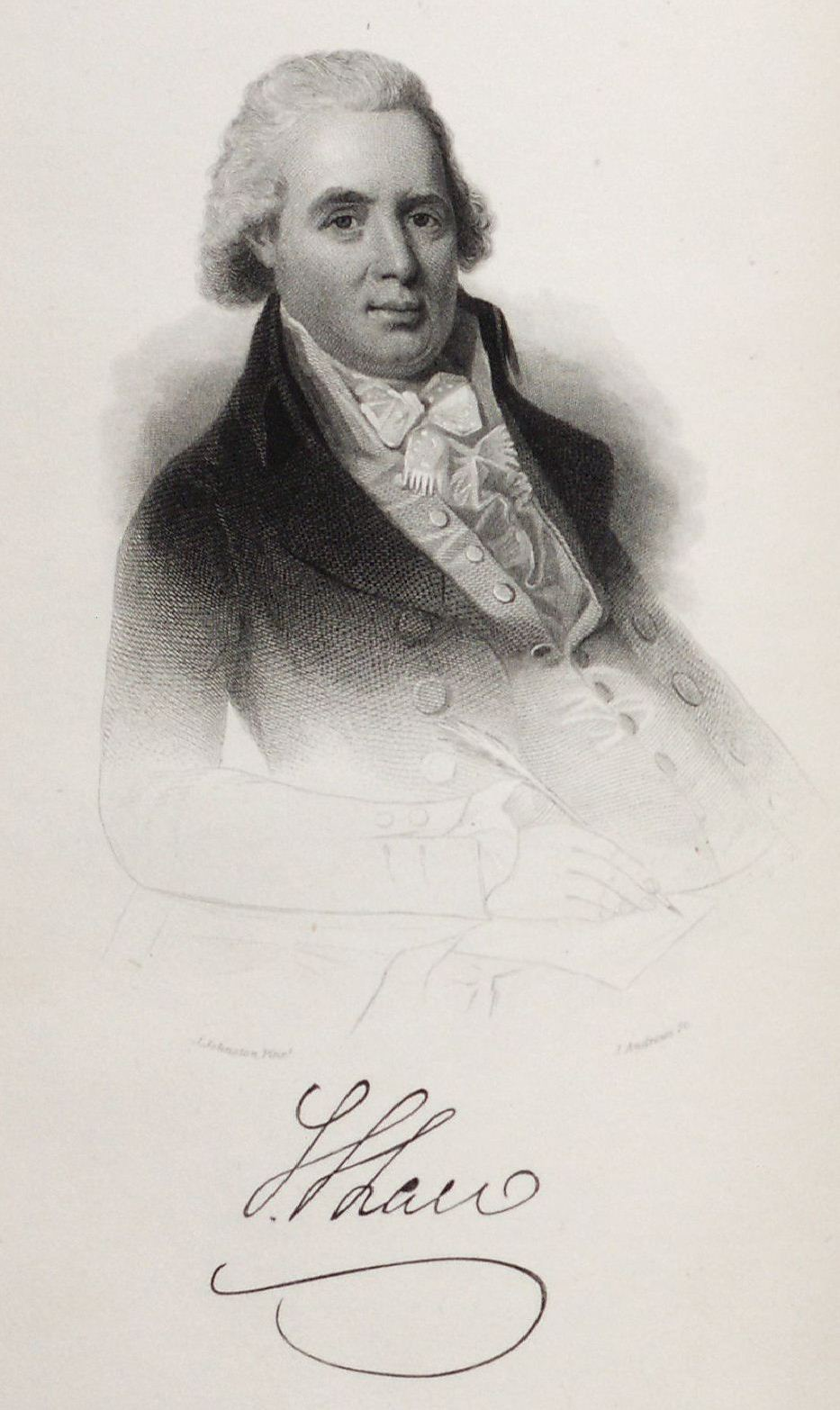
- Samuel Shaw
- Born: October 2, 1754; Boston, Massachusetts
- Died: May 30, 1794 (aged 39); Cape of Good Hope, Dutch Cape Colony
- Military career
- Service years: 1775-84
- Rank: Second lieutenant (continental artillery)
- Commands: Fort Washington
- Conflicts: Revolutionary War; Siege of Boston; Battle of Trenton; Battle of Monmouth; Battle of Yorktown

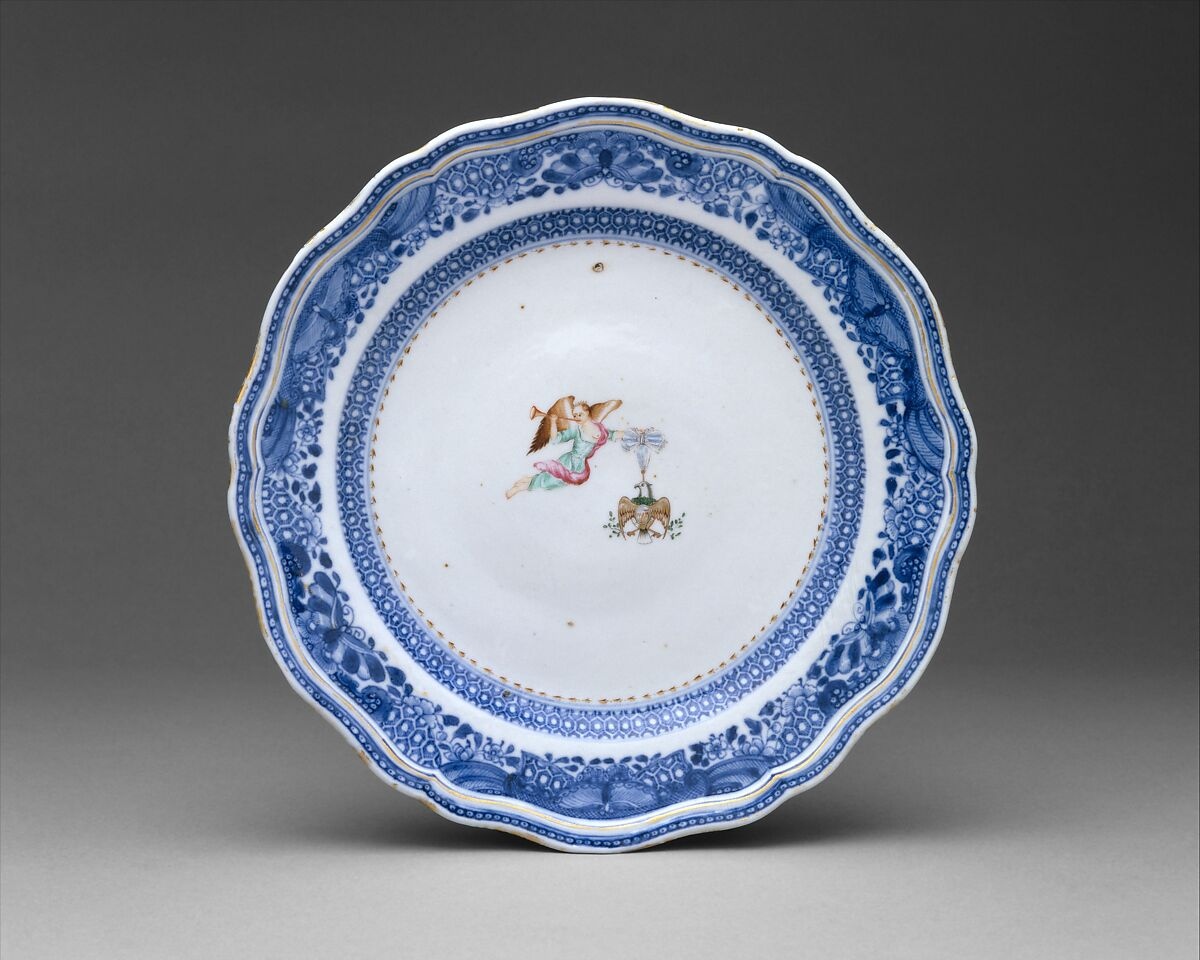
Porcelain brought back by Shaw aboard Empress of China and purchased by George Washington

Samuel Shaw (October 2, 1754 – May 30, 1794) was an American Revolutionary War army officer and diplomat, who served as the first United States consul to China.

Shaw was born in Boston to Francis and Sarah (Burt) Shaw. In 1775 he joined the militia during the Siege of Boston, and in December of that year was commissioned a second lieutenant in the Continental Artillery, and commanded at Fort Washington in 1776. From 1779 to 1783 he served as aide-de-camp to General Henry Knox, chief of the Continental Artillery, in 1780 becoming captain of the 3rd Artillery, and serving in a staff role at the Battle of Trenton, Battle of Monmouth, and Battle of Yorktown.

In 1784, after war's end, he sailed on the Empress of China as an American diplomat to inaugurate the China trade, and from 1786 to 1789 served as consul at Canton. He returned to the United States in 1792 but sailed again for China when reappointed by President George Washington. There he remained until the final year of his life; he died near the Cape of Good Hope on his return voyage to the United States.
