= HMS Cormorant (1781) =

Ship sloop of the Royal Navy

- Ship plan of Cormorant drawn in 1781

History

Massachusetts
- Name: Rattlesnake
- Namesake: Rattlesnake
- Builder: John Peck, Plymouth, Massachusetts (probably)
- Launched: 1780
- Captured: 17 June 1781

Great Britain
- Name: HMS Cormorant
- Namesake: Cormorant
- Acquired: By capture
- Renamed: Rattlesnake (1783)
- Fate: Sold 10 October 1786

General characteristics
- Tons burthen: 198 70/94 or 200 bm
- Length: 89 ft 3 in (27.2 m) (overall); 74 ft 11 in (22.8 m) (keel)
- Beam: 22 ft 4 in (6.8 m)
- Depth of hold: 8 ft 10 1/2 in (2.7 m)
- Propulsion: Sails
- Complement: Rattlesnake:85; HMS Cormorant:90
- Armament: Rattlesnake: 20 guns; HMS Cormorant: 18 × light 4-pounder guns ("of the shortest construction") + 10 × ½-pounder swivel guns

HMS Cormorant was an 18-gun ship sloop of the Royal Navy. She was originally the 20-gun Massachusetts privateer Rattlesnake, which had probably been launched in 1780 at Plymouth, Massachusetts and commissioned in 1781. HMS Assurance captured Rattlesnake on 17 June 1781 shortly after she set out on her first cruise. British naval authorities in New York City subsequently purchased her and commissioned the ship into the Royal Navy as HMS Rattlesnake, and in November 1781 she carried to England the first news of Britain's defeat at the siege of Yorktown. There, she was renamed Cormorant, though the Royal Navy renamed her Rattlesnake in 1783. She was paid off and sold in 1786.

== Privateer Rattlesnake ==
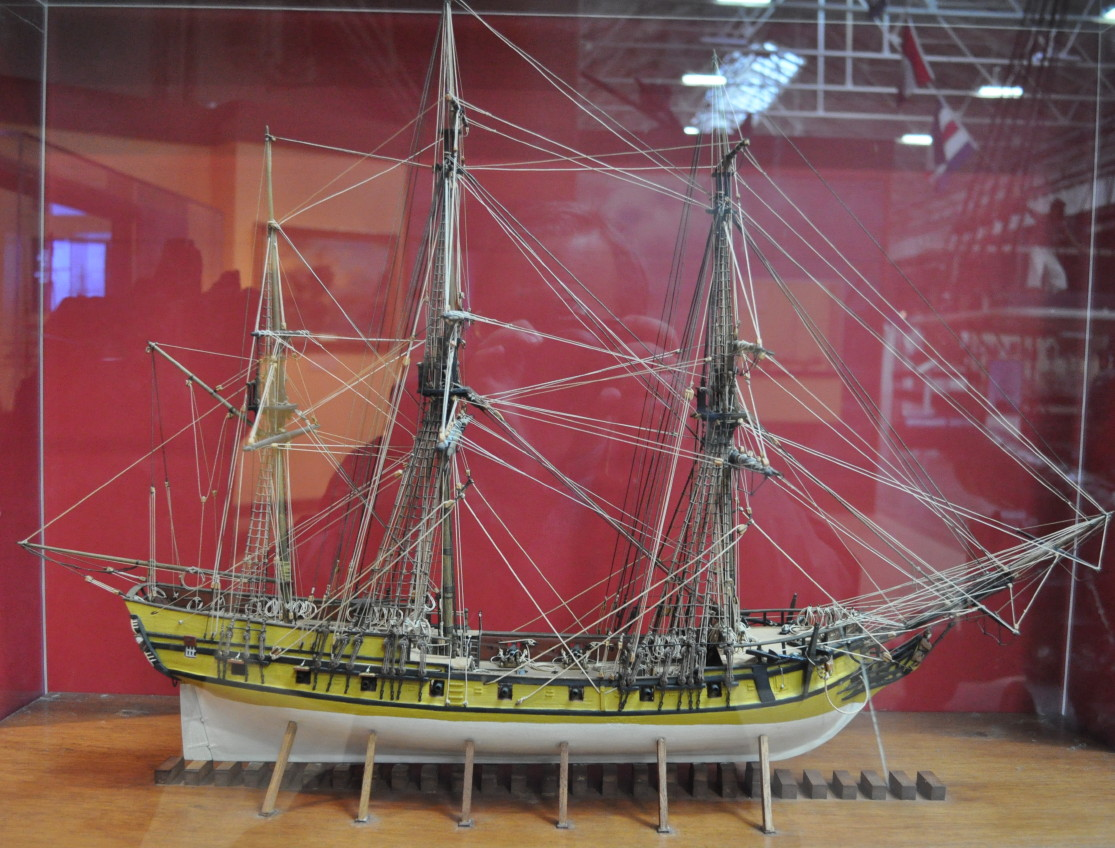
Model of Rattlesnake at the National Museum of the United States Navy

Rattlesnake was probably drawn by John Peck of Boston, Massachusetts, and probably built at Plymouth in 1780. She was very lightly built and was reputedly very fast. Rattlesnake had the appearance of a miniature frigate, with detached quarterdeck and forecastle.

Rattlesnake was commissioned on 12 June 1781 under Commander Mark Clark (or Clarke). She had barely begun her first cruise when she encountered the 44-gun ship HMS Assurance, Captain James Cumming. Assurance captured Rattlesnake on 17 June. He sent her into New York City, where she arrived on 8 July. The Royal Navy purchased her on 28 July in New York.

== HMS Rattlesnake ==
Captain John Melcombe assumed command in September, sailed to England on 29 October, and arrived in late November. Melcombe arrived at the Admiralty on the Sunday evening before 27 November, bearing the news that General Cornwallis had surrendered at Yorktown. (All the reports of Melcombe's arrival refer to him as Captain of His Majesty's sloop Rattlesnake.)

The Navy registered Rattlesnake on 30 November, as HMS Cormorant, there being a Rattlesnake already in service, and Cormorant just having been lost. (Note: Actually the Rattlesnake supposedly still in service had been lost on 12 October 1781. However, the news only reached England around 5 February 1782.)

== HMS Cormorant ==
Cormorant underwent fitting at Plymouth between November 1781 and February 1782. On 19 July 1782 Cormorant recaptured Marine. On 2 July Marine, Rendel, master, had put Torbay, having been chased near Plymouth by a French privateer while Marine was sailing from Dartmouth to Ireland.

On 30 July Cormorant captured the 10-gun naval cutter Téméraire 8–9 leagues (39–43 km) west south west of Cape Clear. She was armed with ten 6-pounder guns and had a crew of 50 men under the command of lieutenant de fregate LeFer. She was nine days out of Brest and taking dispatches to the combined fleets. Before he struck Le Fer threw overboard the dispatches, her logbook and papers, and eight guns. She then arrived at Cork.

In August 1783 the Navy renamed Cormorant Rattlesnake, and Commander John Melcombe recommissioned her.

== HMS Rattlesnake ==
On 3 November 1783 Rattlesnake sailed for the Mediterranean.

On 10 November 1784, Rattlesnake, Captain Melcombe, was escorting the merchantman Countess of Tuscany to Gibraltar when they encountered an Algerine naval squadron of nine ships under the command of an admiral. The Algerine admiral pretended to believe that Rattlesnake was not a British warship and compelled both vessels to put into Algiers. There the Dey of Algiers detained them for five days before releasing them, without apology.

On 29 November 1785 Commander Thomas Hamilton replaced Melcome.

== Fate ==
In July 1786, Rattlesnake was paid off. She was sold on 10 October.
