= French ship Majestueux (1780) =

Ship of the line of the French Navy

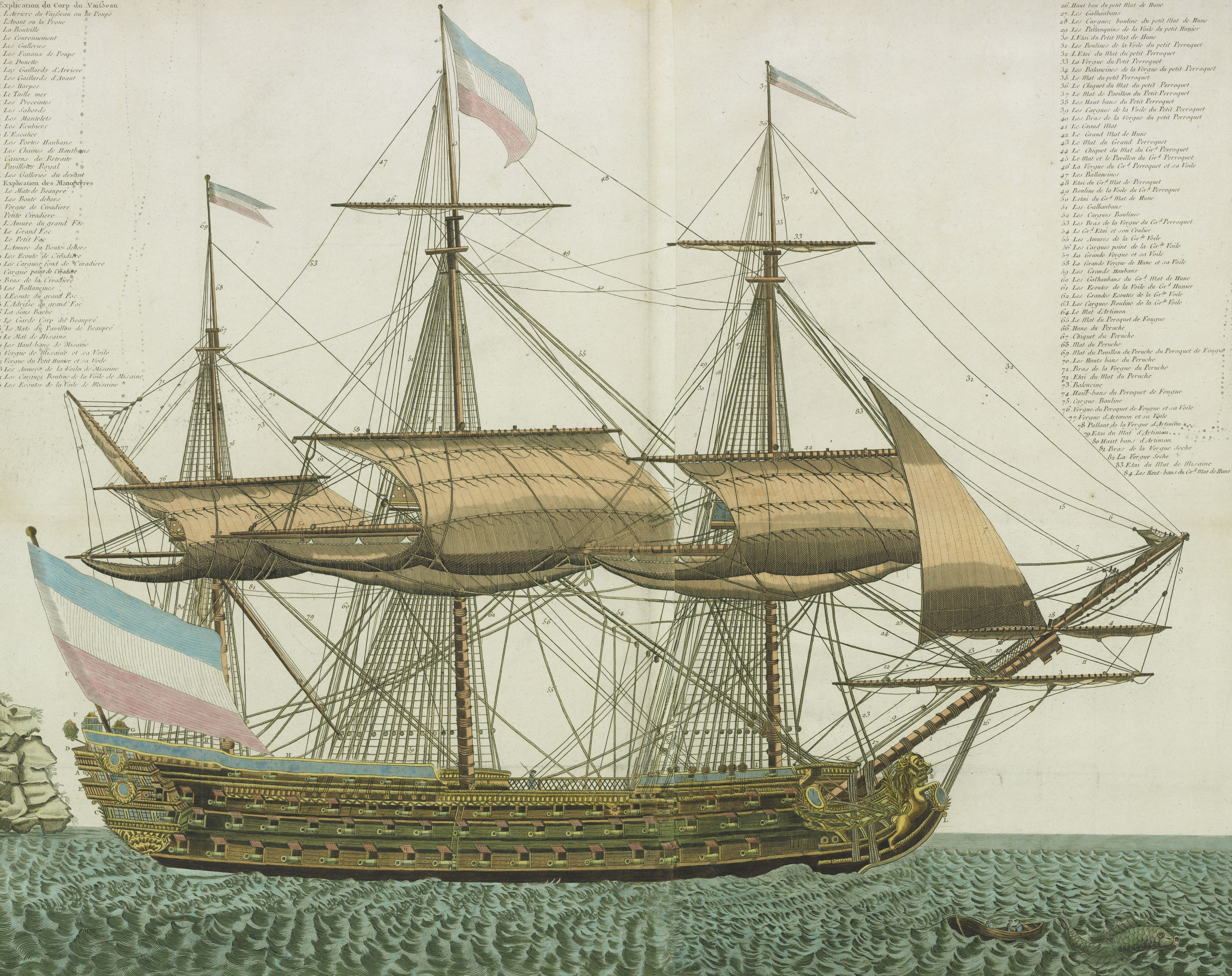
- 18th-century engraving of Terrible, Majestueux's sister ship

History

France
- Name: Majestueux
- Namesake: "Majestuous"
- Ordered: 20 April 1780
- Builder: Toulon
- Laid down: 5 July 1780
- Launched: 17 November 1780
- Commissioned: 4 February 1781
- Fate: Broken up 1808

General characteristics
- Class & type: Terrible-class ship of the line
- Displacement: 4700 tonneaux
- Tons burthen: 2500 port tonneaux
- Length: 60.6 m (198 ft 10 in)
- Beam: 16.2 m (53 ft 2 in)
- Draught: 8.6 m (28 ft 3 in)
- Propulsion: Sail
- Armament: 110 guns

Majestueux was a 110-gun Terrible class ship of the line of the French Navy.

She was renamed Républicain in 1797. In 1807, she was decommissioned and used as a transport.

The ship was broken up in 1808.
