= Queen Charlotte (1789 ship) =

History

Great Britain
- Name: Queen Charlotte
- Builder: Philadelphia
- Launched: 1780
- Fate: Last listed in 1796 with stale data

General characteristics
- Tons burthen: 294, or 298, or 300 (bm)

Queen Charlotte was built in Philadelphia in 1780 almost certainly under another name. She appears in British-origin online sources between 1789 and 1792. She arrived in Britain from the whale fishery. After she arrived in Britain she made two more voyages as a whaler in the British southern whale fishery. She was last listed in 1796 with stale data.

== Career ==
Queen Charlotte arrived in London on 24 February 1789 from the Southern Whale Fishery. Her captain was William Lucas and her owner Oliver & Co. She had gathered two tuns of sperm oil, 90 tuns of whale oil, 40 cwt of whale bone, and 6500 seal skins. She had been reported whaling off the Falklands in 1786. However, she did not appear in Lloyd's List or Lloyd's Register (LR) before 1789, suggesting that she was not operating out of England; probably she was sailing out of Bermuda.

Queen Charlotte first appeared in LR in 1789.

Queen Charlotte, of about 300 tons burthen, "Plantation built", (Note: Plantation built means built in a British plantation, i.e. colony.) was offered for auction on 11 August 1789 "by the candle" at Lloyd's Coffee House. The advertisement stated that she was suitable for whaling in the southern fishery as she had been recently employed in that trade.

Year	Master	Owner	Trade	Source & notes
1789	W.Lucas "Indecipherable"	Fountain; Stephens	London-Southern Fishery	LR
1790	S.Paul	Stephens	London-Southern Fishery	LR

1st whaling voyage (1789-1790): Captain Paul Pease sailed from London on 1 October 1789. Queen Charlotte returned on 29 November 1790.

Year	Master	Owner	Trade	Source & notes
1792	S.Paul	Captain & Co.	London-Southern Fishery	LR

2nd whaling voyage (1791–1792): Captain Simon Paul sailed from England in 1791, bound for Africa. On 6 October 1791 Queen Charlotte was reported to be at Tygers Island Bay, (off Angola). She returned to England on 25 July 1792 with whale bone, and 6500 seal skins.

Year	Master	Owner	Trade	Source & notes
1796	S.Paul	Captain & Co.	London-Southern Fishery	LR

Queen Charlotte was last listed in 1796 with stale data.
