= French cutter Téméraire (1780) =

Military ship

History

Kingdom of France
- Name: Téméraire
- Namesake: Temerarious
- Laid down: July 1780
- Launched: 13 November 1780
- Commissioned: December 1780
- Fate: Stricken 1784

General characteristics
- Class & type: Facteur-class cutter
- Displacement: 150 tonnes
- Length: 26 metres
- Beam: 6.5 metres
- Draught: 2.5 metres
- Sail plan: Xebec
- Armament: 2 × 4-pounder + 8 × swivel guns; Later: 4 × 3-pounders

Téméraire was a cutter aviso of the French Navy, commissioned in Lorient in December 1780.

== Career ==
Built by engineer Arnous-Dessaulsays after plans by Charles Segondat-Duvernet, Téméraire was started in July 1780 in Lorient, and commissioned in December.

In July 1782, HMS Cormorant captured her off Brest. (British sources give the place of capture as 8–9 leagues WSW of Cape Clear.) Téméraire was armed with ten 6-pounder guns and had a crew of 50 men under the command of lieutenant de frégate Le Fer. She was nine days out of Brest and taking dispatches to the combined fleets. Before he struck Le Fer, her commander, threw overboard the dispatches, her logbook and papers, and eight guns. She then arrived at Cork.

The French recaptured her in 1783 and recommissioned her in the French Royal Navy.

== Fate ==
Téméraire was struck from the Navy lists in 1784; at that time, she was either in Toulon or in Brest.

== Sources ==
- Demerliac, Alain (2004). La Marine de Louis XVI: Nomenclature des Navires Français de 1774 à 1792 (in French). Éditions Ancre. ISBN 2-906381-23-3.
- Roche, Jean-Michel (2005). Dictionnaire des bâtiments de la flotte de guerre française de Colbert à nos jours [Dictionary of French Warships from Colbert to Today] (in French). Vol. 1. Group Retozel-Maury Millau. ISBN 978-2-9525917-0-6. OCLC 165892922.
