= HMS Amphitrite (1778) =

History

Great Britain
- Name: HMS Amphitrite
- Ordered: 8 January 1777
- Builder: Deptford Dockyard
- Laid down: 2 July 1777
- Launched: 28 May 1778
- Completed: 22 July 1778
- Commissioned: May 1778
- Fate: Wrecked on 30 January 1794

General characteristics
- Class & type: 24-gun Porcupine-class sixth-rate post ship
- Tons burthen: 51355/94 (bm)
- Length: 114 ft 3 in (34.8 m) (gundeck); 94 ft 3 1/2 in (28.7 m) (keel)
- Beam: 32 ft (9.8 m)
- Draught: 7 ft 10 in (2.4 m)
- Depth of hold: 10 ft 3 in (3.1 m)
- Sail plan: Full-rigged ship
- Complement: 160
- Armament: Upper deck: 22 × 9-pounder guns; QD: 2 × 6-pounder guns

HMS Amphitrite was a 24-gun Porcupine-class sixth-rate post ship of the Royal Navy. She served during the American Revolution primarily in the economic war. On the one hand she protected the trade by capturing or assisting at the capture of a number of privateers, some of which the Royal Navy then took into service. On the other hand, she also captured many American merchant vessels, most of them small. Amphitrite was wrecked early in 1794.

== Construction and commissioning ==
Amphitrite was ordered on 8 January 1777 from Deptford Dockyard, and laid down there on 2 July 1777. She was built under the supervision of Master Shipwright Adam Hayes, and was launched on 28 May 1778. She was commissioned into navy service on 22 July 1778, having cost a total of £12,737.6.6d to build, including the cost of fitting out and coppering.

== Career ==
She was commissioned in May 1778 under the command of Captain Thomas Gaborian. She initially operated as part of the squadron off the Downs. There she captured the French privateer Agneau on 15 August. Amphitrite shared with the sloop Fairy, and the cutters Griffin, Flying Fish, Sprightly, and Wells, in the capture on 24 May of the French privateers Dunkerque and Prince de Robcq, which had "eight ransomers" aboard. Then on 6 July Amphitrite and the cutter Rambler captured the shallop Samuel and Elizabeth.

In 1780 Amphitrite passed under the command of Captain Robert Biggs. She was among the vessels sharing in the proceeds of the capture in January 1780 of the brig Kitty and the ship Jolly Tar. (Note: The date of January 1780 is almost certainly a mistake, with January perhaps more correctly reading June or July. The other vessels mentioned in the item were on the North America station, and Amphitrite had not sailed there yet. Furthermore, Charles Town did not come into British hands until May.) Biggs sailed Amphitrite to North America in May that year. On her arrival she joined Graves's squadron.

In June 1781 Admiral Mariot Arbuthnot sent Amphitrite and several other vessels to attempt to intercept some French reinforcements from entering Boston.

On 30 June Amphitrite captured the brig Adventure. One month later, on 30 July, Medea, Amphitrite, and the armed ship General Monk shared in the capture of the schooner Neptune. The squadron that Arbuthnot sent to Boston recaptured HMS Atalanta on 7 July.

On 7 September 1781 Medea captured Belisarius, "a fast sailing frigate of 26 guns and 147 men, belonging to Salem". Medea captured her off the Delaware River. Amphitrite and Savage shared in the capture. The Royal Navy took her into service as the sixth rate Bellisarius, but then sold her in 1783, after the end of the war.

On 10 September Admiral Graves received two letters from Biggs dated 10 September, at Boston. Biggs mentioned that together with the armed ship General Monk, Amphitrite had captured four prizes. Then on 4 September she had encountered a French ship of the line and a frigate off Cape Ann, but had escaped them. Lastly, Biggs reported that on 2 September Chatham had captured the French frigate Magicienne on 2 September off Cape Ann. Biggs reported that the French lost 60 men killed and 40 wounded; the British lost one man killed and one man wounded.

Between 20 August and 31 October Amphitrite made a number of captures:

- Experiment, privateer of 300 tons, 20 men and 22 guns;
- Endeavour, of 70 tons, eight men, carrying beef, port, etc.;
- Union, of 100 tons, nine men, carrying beef, port, etc.;
- St. John, of 90 90 tons, 10 men, carrying plank;
- Minerva, of 95 tons, 10 men, carrying tobacco;
- Dolphin of 100 tons, 11 men, carrying plank;
- Nero, carrying tobacco; and lastly,
- Revenge privateer, of 40 tons, 30 men, and eight guns.

Amphitrite may have come under the command of Captain Robert George temporarily in November 1781. (Note: This could be a mistake, confusing both the name, "Robert George" for "Rupert George", and the time.)

Between 11 November and 23 March 1782, Amphitrite took three vessels: the schooner Betsey (12 January), and the brigs Sally (13 February) and Peggy (20 February). Amphitrite and Amphion then took the privateer Franklin on 3 April off the Chesapeake. She was in ballast. Five days later the same two captured the brig Gale, off Cape Henry. She was taking coffee to Amsterdam. Then on the 14th, they took the brig Patty, also off Cape Henry. She was carrying flour to Havana. That same day they took the brig Nymphe, also off Cape Henry, and also carrying flour to Havana.

On 2 May Amphitrite and Amphion were off Match Springs when they captured three vessels on their way to Philadelphia. Fair American and the brig Adriana were carrying rum and dry goods. The sloop Alpin was carrying sugar and coffee. Hornet and the privateer Digby shared in the capture of the Adriana and the Alpin.

Observer, a sloop of 10 guns, was the Massachusetts privateer Amsterdam, which Amphitrite captured on 19 October. The British took Observer into the Royal Navy and sold her on 21 October 1784.

On 12 November, Amphitrite captured the brig Adventure, the schooner Salisbury, the ship Rattlesnake, and the sloop Phoenix. On 5 December she captured the ship Bellisarius, brig Marianne, and schooner Neptune.

Amphitrite continued to take prizes in 1782:

- Betsey (4 March);
- Peggy 22 April;
- Nymphe (5 October);
- Franklin (25 June);
- ship Enterprise recaptured (3 September); and lastly,
- Vigilante (20 December).

Amphitrite, Fowey, Hope, and Thames captured the sloop Lark. Amphitrite alone captured the ship Salem Packet, the brigs Amsterdam, Dolphin, and Minerva, and the sloops Dove and Fox.

American records show that in late January 1783, Amphitrite, Captain Robert George, captured the former Massachusetts privateer and now letter of marque Apollo. She sent Apollo into New York where she was condemned and sold in March.

== Between the wars ==
After the end of the American War of Independence Amphitrite returned to Britain and was paid off in January 1784. She underwent a small repair between 1783 and 1784, followed by a larger one between 1790 and 1793, after which she was fitted out at Woolwich.

== French Revolutionary Wars ==
Amphitritie was recommissioned in April 1793 with the outbreak of the French Revolutionary Wars, under Captain John Child Purvis. On 23 July 1793 she arrived at Portsmouth from Lymington under the command of Captain Bowyer.New Forest Military Archive She came under the command of Captain James Dickinson in April 1794, and then Captain Anthony Hunt the following month. Hunt sailed her to the Mediterranean where she was on the Toulon station with Vice Admiral Hood.

== Fate ==
On 30 January 1794 Amphitrite was wrecked after striking an uncharted submerged shoal whilst entering Leghorn harbour. Efforts were made to save her, but they were futile and she was abandoned as a wreck. A court martial on 3 February acquitted Hunt of blame.
