= James Cumming (Royal Navy officer) =

British Naval officer

Admiral James Cumming
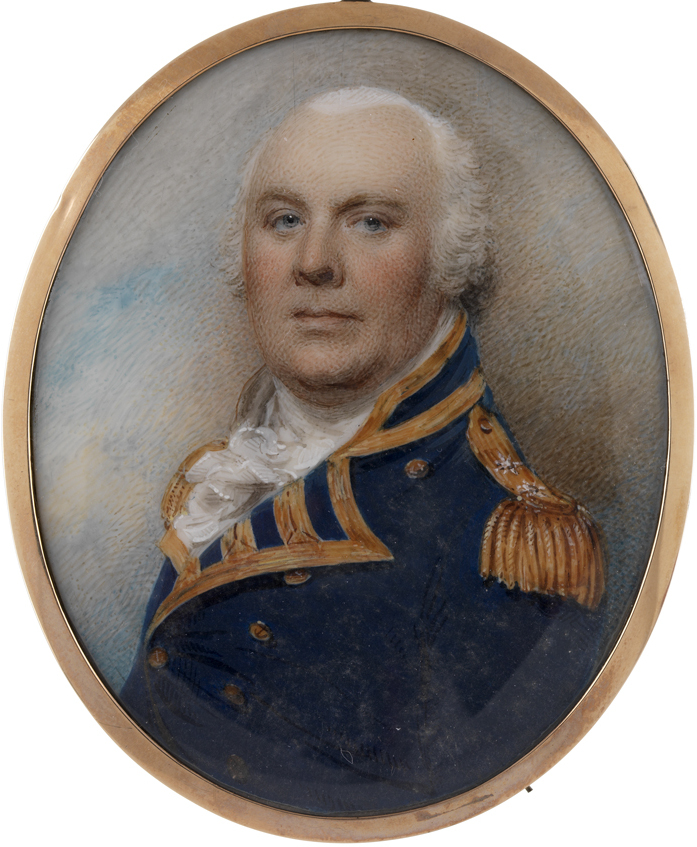
- Miniature portrait of Cumming c.1795–1800
- Born: 16 April 1738; Sandwich, Kent, England
- Died: 19 August 1808 (aged 70); Wilmington, England
- Burial place: St Luke's, London, England
- Military career
- Allegiance: United Kingdom
- Branch: Royal Navy
- Service years: 1751–1808
- Rank: Admiral
- Commands: HMS Tamar; HMS Wasp; HMS Cruizer; HMS Deal Castle; HMS Aurora; HMS Assurance; HMS Confederate; HMS Resolution
- Conflicts: Seven Years' War; Capture of Belle Île; American Revolutionary War; Battle of St. Lucia; French Revolutionary Wars

Admiral James Cumming (16 April 1738 – 19 August 1808) was a British Royal Navy officer. He sailed with John Byron as part of a circumnavigation of the world in 1764. He fought in the American Revolutionary War and eventually rose to the rank of Admiral before his death in 1808.

== Early life ==
Born in Sandwich, England to a Naval family, he was the third son to James Cumming, A Lieutenant of Greenwich Hospital. He studied at the Royal Naval Academy and was commissioned Lieutenant in 1758.

== Voyage around the world ==
In 1764, Cumming served as 1st Lieutenant on HMS Dolphin, on a circumnavigation of the world. Captain John Byron was secretly tasked with surveying the Falklands Islands, searching for the non-existent Pepys's Island, and finding a northeastern passage across North America.

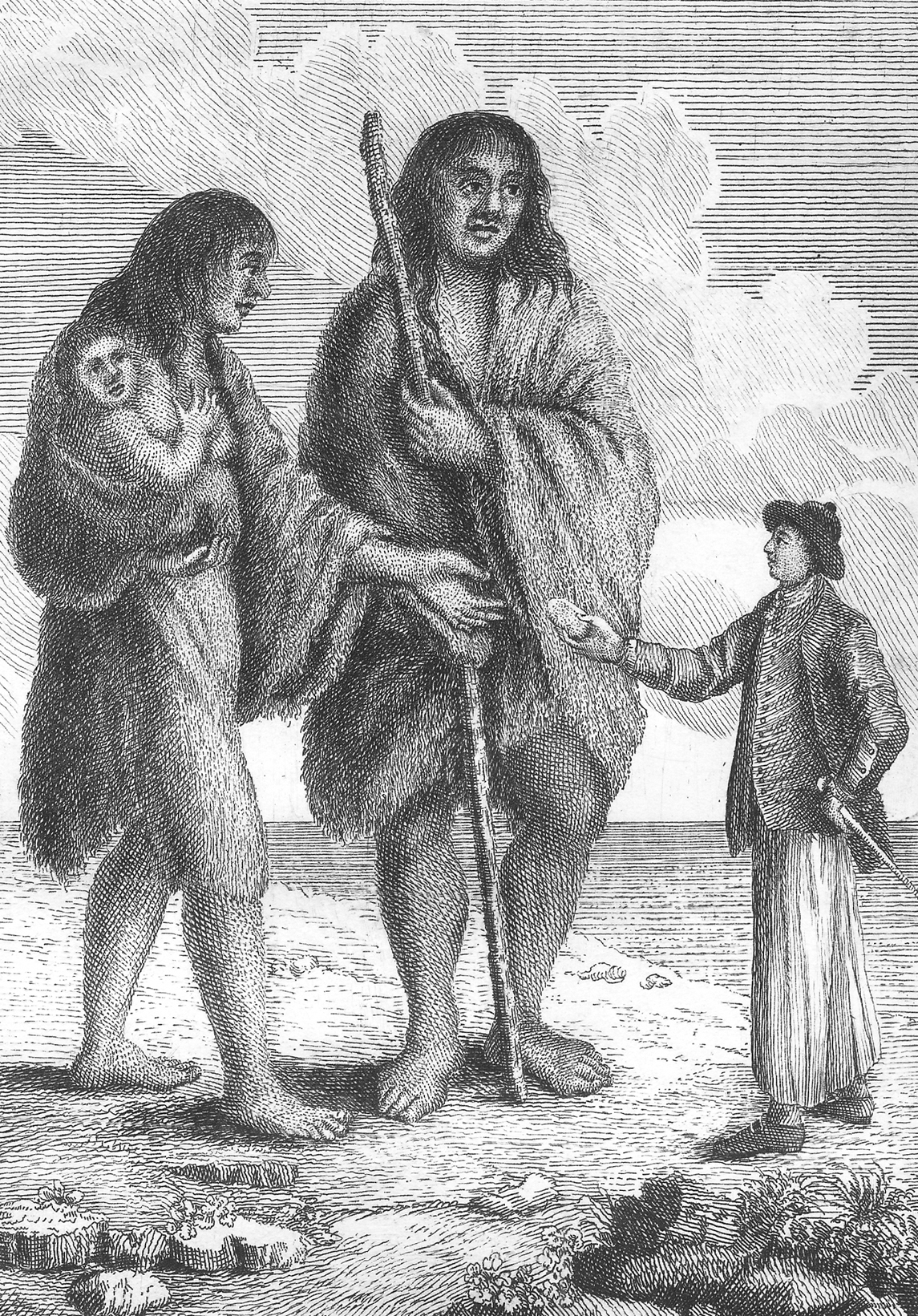
Sketch of Patagonian Giants by an officer aboard HMS Dolphin

The two-ship expedition made landfall in Patagonia, where the crew made contact with indigenous people. Cumming, being the only other officer ashore within a close distance, became Byron's reference to the natives' supposed enormous size, due in part to his own tall stature. Cumming, who stood at 6'2", was described as being dwarfed over by the natives. Following the voyage, various accounts would be added to the already existing European lore of the 'Patagonian Giants'. Later on, it was implied through conversation to Captain Robert Scott, an uncle of Sir Walter Scott and close acquaintance of Cumming, that the descriptions of the giants were merely exaggerated.

In April, 1765 Cumming was transferred and promoted to Commander of HMS Tamar, the Dolphin's consort ship. He would reach England again in 1766, after stopping in Antigua to repair a broken rudder.

== Service in the American Revolutionary War ==
Cumming was a commissioned captain during the American Revolutionary war, seeing action on both the American coast and West Indies. He would capture several American Privateers during this time. He was present during the Battle of St. Lucia, commanding HMS Aurora as part of Samuel Barrington's convoy against the French attempt to re-take the island. The Aurora was among three frigates positioned in a line of battle to protect the windward side of the island. Thereafter, Cumming would go on to command HMS Assurance in 1780. His last commission was HMS Confederate, which proved to be a defective ship.

== Later career ==
Cumming was not commissioned again until 1793, when he commanded HMS Resolution (74) during the early period of the French Revolutionary Wars. Soon after, he reached flag rank and would not see any further field service. He was promoted to Vice-Admiral in 1795, and finally Admiral of the White in 1805 before dying at his home in Wilmington, England in 1808.
