= HMS Mentor (1781) =

History

Massachusetts
- Name: Aurora
- Owner: Mungo Mackay and Thomas Dennie
- Commissioned: 2 October 1780
- Captured: 11 July 1781

Great Britain
- Name: HMS Mentor
- Acquired: 11 September 1781 by purchase of a prize
- Fate: Foundered April 1783

General characteristics
- Tons burthen: 230 (bm)
- Sail plan: Sloop
- Complement: Massachusetts:20; RN:125
- Armament: Massachusetts:10-24 guns; RN:18 × 6-pounder guns

HMS Mentor was the Massachusetts letter of marque Aurora, commissioned in 1780. The Royal Navy captured her in July 1781 and took her into service as HMS Mentor. Mentor disappeared in 1783.

== Letter of marque ==
Captain Porter, of Boston, commissioned Aurora on 2 October 1780. While sailing to Port-au-Prince she came upon the wreck of HMS Stirling Castle and was able to rescue four men.

Aurora unloaded her cargo at Port-au-Prince and started to take on a cargo of sugar for France. While she was loading a squall struck her. The squall overturned and sank her, drowning several men in the process. She was salvaged and two weeks later sailed with her cargo to France. Aurora sailed from Lorient on 24 April 1781 and returned to Boston on 20 May.

On 16 June her owners posted bond for Aurora to operate as a privateer. She sailed in July in company with the Massachusetts privateer Belisarius, James Munro, master, but the two ships separated.

The 74-gun ship HMS Royal Oak captured Aurora on 11 July 1781, or 18 July. She was at New York by 20 August.

== Royal Navy ==
The Royal Navy purchased Aurora on 11 September 1781 at Boston. The Navy already had an Aurora in service so the Navy named the prize HMS Mentor, and Commander Richard Tilledge commissioned her.

Mentor was one of the naval vessels that shared in the capture of the brigs Unity and Betsey, on 20 January 1783.

After HMS Cerberus wrecked on 21 August 1783 at Bermuda, Mentor was sent to take off the survivors. Mentor did so, but then disappeared. She was assumed to have foundered with all hands, including the survivors from Cerberus she had taken on.
