= Terrible-class ship of the line =

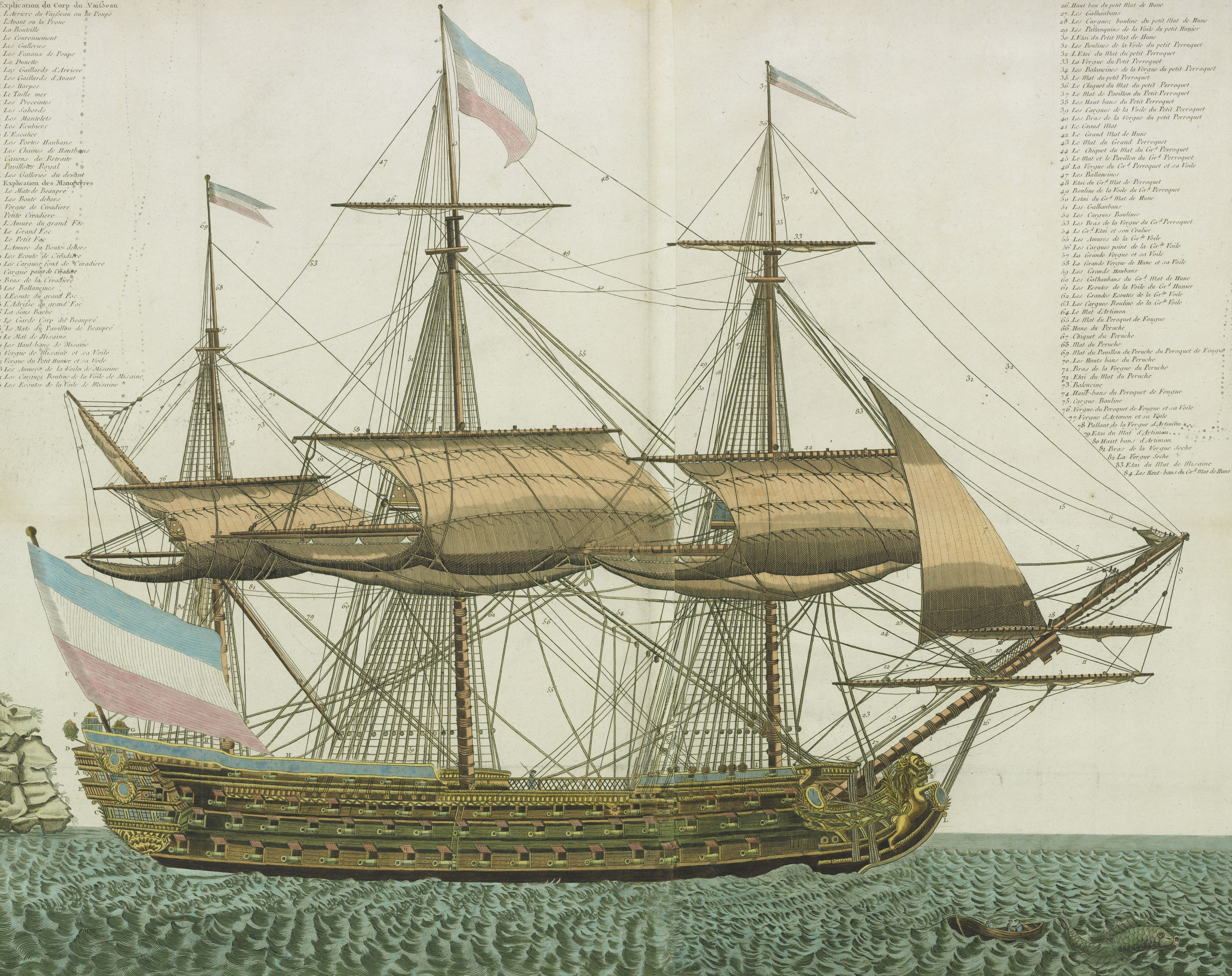
- 18th-century engraving of Terrible

Class overview
- Name: Terrible
- Builders: Toulon
- Operators: French Navy
- Completed: 2

General characteristics
- Type: Ship of the line
- Displacement: 4700 tonneaux
- Tons burthen: 2500 port tonneaux
- Length: 60.6 metres
- Beam: 16.2 metres
- Draught: 8.6 metres
- Propulsion: Sail
- Armament: 110 guns
- Armour: Timber
- Notes: Ships in class include: Terrible, Majestueux

The Terrible class was a type of two 110-gun ships of the line, built to a design by Joseph-Marie-Blaise Coulomb.

== Ships ==
- Terrible

Builder: Toulon
Ordered: 23 October 1778
Launched: 27 January 1780
Fate:Broken up in 1804

- Majestueux

Builder: Toulon
Ordered: 20 April 1780
Launched: 17 November 1780
Fate:armed en flûte from 1807
