= French ship Terrible (1780) =

Ship of the line of the French Navy

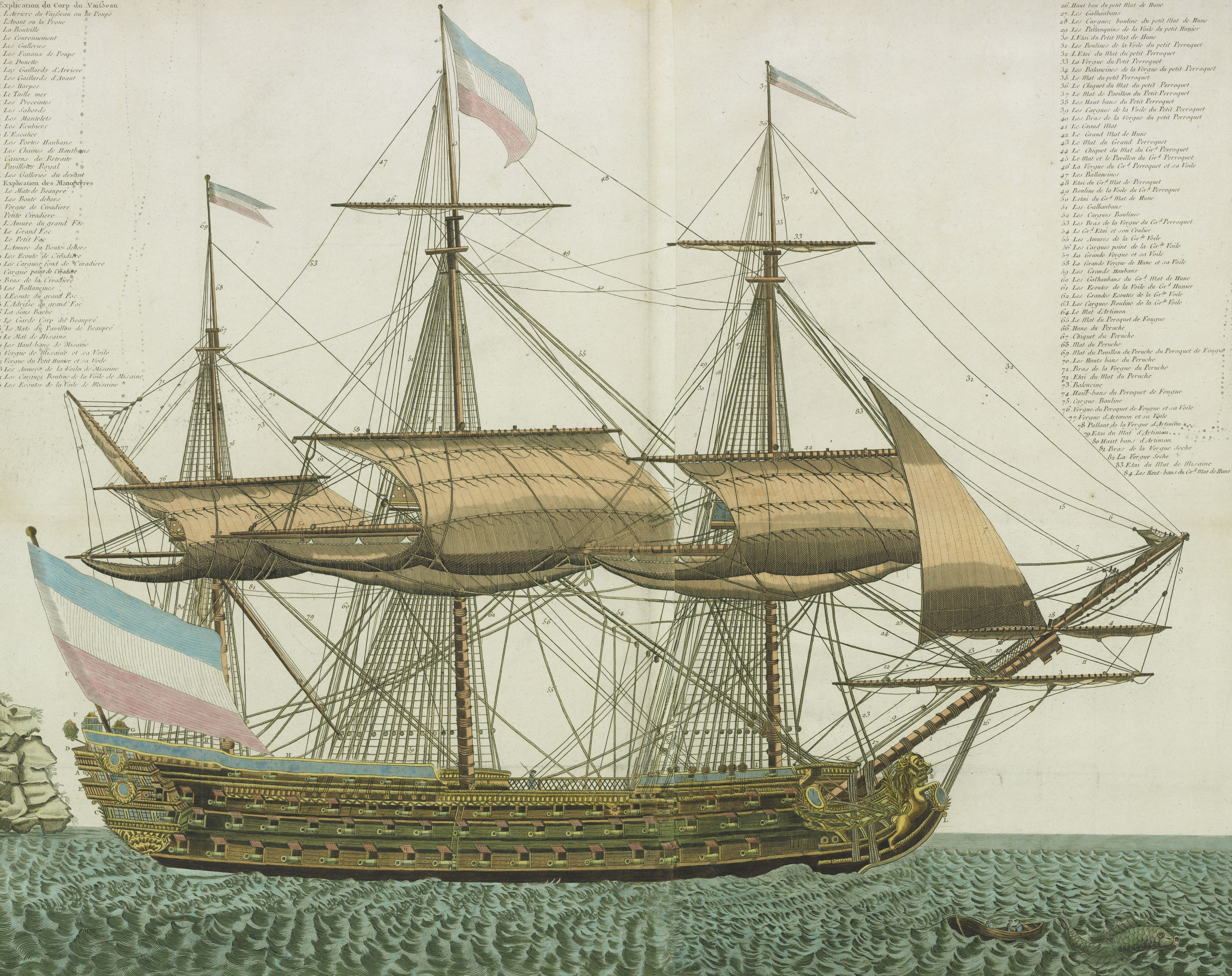
- 18th-century engraving of Terrible

History

France
- Name: Terrible
- Ordered: 23 October 1778
- Builder: Toulon
- Laid down: April 1779
- Launched: 27 January 1780
- Commissioned: May 1780
- Decommissioned: 1802
- Fate: Broken up in October 1804

General characteristics
- Class & type: Terrible-class ship of the line
- Displacement: 4700 tonneaux
- Tons burthen: 2500 port tonneaux
- Length: 60.6 m (198 ft 10 in)
- Beam: 16.2 m (53 ft 2 in)
- Draught: 8.6 m (28 ft 3 in)
- Propulsion: Sail
- Armament: 110 guns

Terrible was a 110-gun Terrible-class ship of the line of the French Navy. She was the lead ship of her class.

== Career ==
In 1780, she was under Louis-André Beaussier de Chateauvert.

In 1783, she was part of a Franco-Spanish fleet assembled in Cádiz under Admiral Charles Henri Hector, Count of Estaing, but the American Revolutionary War ended before it saw action.

She took part in the Glorious First of June, where she was dismasted by HMS Royal Sovereign. She later took part in the Croisière du Grand Hiver and the Croisière de Bruix.

She was decommissioned in 1802, condemned in May 1804, and eventually broken up in October of that year.
