= List of ship launches in 1779 =

The list of ship launches in 1779 includes a chronological list of some ships launched in 1779.

Date	Ship	Class	Builder	Location	Country	Notes
2 January	Sibyl	Enterprise-class frigate	Henry Adams	Bucklers Hard	Great Britain	For Royal Navy.
4 January	Walpole	East Indiaman	Wells	Deptford	Great Britain	For British East India Company.
18 January	Diane	Sibylle-class frigate		Saint-Malo	Kingdom of France	For French Navy.
January	Duguay-Trouin	Privateer		Havre de Grâce	Kingdom of France	For Thieulent Colleville.
January	Le Jean Bart	Privateer		Havre de Grâce	Kingdom of France	For Colleville et Reverdin.
1 February	Miño	Third rate	Reales Astilleros de Esteiro	Ferrol	Spain	For Spanish Navy.
3 February	Baleine	Baleine-class gabarre		Bordeaux	Kingdom of France	For French Navy.
7 February	Neptune	East Indiaman	builder	location	Great Britain	For private owner.
13 February	Jason	Third rate		Toulon	Kingdom of France	For French Navy.
17 February	Thorn	Swan-class sloop	James Betts	Mistley	Great Britain	For Royal Navy.
18 February	Batavier	Fourth rate		Amsterdam	Dutch Republic	For Dutch Navy.
1 March	Cerf	Cerf-class cutter		Saint-Malo	Kingdom of France	For French Navy.
1 March	Chevreuil	Cerf-class cutter		Saint-Malo	Kingdom of France	For French Navy.
4 March	Serapis	Roebuck-class ship	Randall & Brent	Rotherhithe	Great Britain	For Royal Navy.
5 March	Outarde	Baleine-class gabarre		Havre de Grâce	Kingdom of France	For French Navy.
18 March	Fury	Swan-class sloop	Mackenzie Sime	Leith	Kingdom of France	For Royal Navy.
20 March	Duc de la Vauginon	Privateer	André-François Normand	Honfleur	Kingdom of France	For private owner.
31 March	Triomphant	Ship of the line	Joseph-Marie-Blaise Coulomb	Toulon	Kingdom of France	For French Navy.
March	Crescent	Enterprise-class frigate	Hilhouse	Bristol	Great Britain	For Royal Navy.
1 April	Hussard	Cerf-class cutter		Saint-Malo	Kingdom of France	For French Navy.
3 April	Serpent	Cerf-class cutter		Dunkirk	Kingdom of France	For French Navy.
14 April	Desiatyi	Vosmoi-class frigate	S. I. Afanaseyev	Novokhoperskaya	Russia	For Imperial Russian Navy.
15 April	Deviatyi	Vosmoi-class frigate	S. I. Afanaseyev	Novokhoperskaya	Russia	For Imperial Russian Navy.
16 April	Levrette	Cutter		Dunkirk	Kingdom of France	For French Navy.
19 April	Odinnadtsatyi	Vosmoi-class frigate	S. I. Afanaseyev	Novokhoperskaya	Russia	For Imperial Russian Navy.
28 April	Hermione	Concorde-class frigate		Rochefort, Charente-Maritime	Kingdom of France	For French Navy.
29 April	Bonetta	Swan-class sloop	John Perry	Blackwall Yard	Great Britain	For Royal Navy.
April	Wild Cat	Privateer		Salem, Massachusetts	United States	For John Fisk et al.
14 May	Patrikii	Modified Pavel-class frigate	M. D. Portnov	Arkhangelsk	Russia	For Imperial Russian Navy.
16 May	Simion	Modified Pavel-class frigate	M. D. Portnov	Arkhangelsk	Russia	For Imperial Russian Navy.
17 May	Champion	Porcupine-class post ship	John Barnard	Ipswich	Great Britain	For Royal Navy.
17 May	Pandora	Porcupine-class post ship	Adams & Barnard	Deptford	Great Britain	For Royal Navy.
18 May	Thunder	Etna-class bomb vessel	John Randall	Rotherhithe	Great Britain	For Royal Navy.
31 May	Galatea	Leon Trionfante-class ship of the line	Zuanne Seibezzi	Venice	Republic of Venice	For Venetian Navy.
31 May	Néréide	Sibylle-class frigate	Geoffroy	Saint-Malo	Kingdom of France	For French Navy.
May	Drake	Brig-sloop	Henry Ladd	Dover	Great Britain	For Royal Navy.
1 June	Pegasus	Enterprise-class frigate	Adam Hayes	Deptford Dockyard	Great Britain	For Royal Navy.
2 June	Terror	Etna-class bomb vessel	John Randall	Rotherhithe	Great Britain	For Royal Navy.
15 June	Prins Frederik	Third rate		Rotterdam	Dutch Republic	For Dutch Navy.
21 June	Fenice	Leon Trionfante-class ship of the line		Venice	Republic of Venice	For Venetian Navy.
24 June	Spiridon	Slava Rossii-class ship of the line	Joseph Noy	Saint Petersburg	Russia	For Imperial Russian Navy.
24 June	Tsar Konstantin	Tsar Konstantin-class ship of the line	M. D. Portnov	Saint Petersburg	Russia	For Imperial Russian Navy.
28 June	Galathée	Galathée-class frigate		Rochefort, Charente-Maritime	Kingdom of France	For French Navy.
30 June	Edgar	Arrogant-class ship of the line	George White	Deptford Dockyard	Great Britain	For Royal Navy.
14 July	Ulysses	Roebuck-class ship	John Fisher	Liverpool	Great Britain	For Royal Navy.
15 July	Brilliant	Enterprise-class frigate	Henry Adams	Bucklers Hard	Great Britain	For Royal Navy.
15 July	Cerberus	Active-class frigate	John Randall	Rotherhithe	Great Britain	For Royal Navy.
29 July	Siren	Porcupine-class post ship	John Baker	Newcastle upon Tyne	Great Britain	For Royal Navy.
30 July	Alcide	Albion-class ship of the line	Adam Hayes	Deptford Dockyard	Great Britain	For Royal Navy.
31 July	Cyclops	Enterprise-class frigate	James Menetone & Son	Limehouse	Great Britain	For Royal Navy.
July	Active	Brigantine		Marshfield, Massachusetts	United States	For Continental Navy.
11 August	Fine	Sibylle-class frigate	Jean-Jacques Maistral	Rochefort	Kingdom of France	For French Navy.
11 August	Railleuse	Galathée-class frigate		Bordeaux	Kingdom of France	For French Navy.
27 August	Magnanime	Magnanime-class ship of the line		Rochefort	Kingdom of France	For French Navy.
28 August	Endymion	Roebuck-class ship	Edward Greaves	Limehouse	Great Britain	For Royal Navy.
28 August	Montagu	Alfred-class ship of the line	Nicholas Phillips	Chatham Dockyard	Great Britain	For Royal Navy.
28 August	Sérieuse	Magicienne-class frigate		Toulon	Kingdom of France	For French Navy.
29 August	Minorca	Xebec		Port Mahon	(Kingdom of Great Britain) Balearic Islands	For Royal Navy.
11 September	Lutine	Magicienne-class frigate		Toulon	Kingdom of France	For French Navy.
25 September	Nossa Senhora de Bom	Fifth rate		Lisbon	Portugal	For Portuguese Navy.
1 October	Alert	Cutter	Thomas King	Dover	Great Britain	For Royal Navy.
12 October	Lascelles	East Indiaman	Wells	Deptford	Great Britain	For British East India Company.
23 November	Ponsborne	East Indiaman	Barnard	Deptford	Great Britain	For British East India Company.
25 October	Émeraude	Sibylle-class frigate	Jean-Jacques Maistral	Nantes	Kingdom of France	For French Navy.
27 October	Laurel	Enterprise-class frigate	Thomas Raymond	Southampton	Great Britain	For Royal Navy.
October	La Comtess d'Artois	Comtesse d'Artois-class frigate	Jacques Denys	Dunkirk	Kingdom of France	For private owner.
October	Le Stanislas	Privateer	M. Blanche	Havre de Grâce	Kingdom of France	For Robert Coppens.
October	Tigre	Indien-class frigate	Jacques Boux	Amsterdam	Dutch Republic	For French Navy.
11 November	San Justo	San Joaquin-class ship of the line		Carthagen	Spain	For Spanish Navy.
26 November	Cleopatra	Amazon-class frigate	Hilhouse	Bristol	Great Britain	For Royal Navy.
9 December	Mercury	Enterprise-class frigate	Peter Everitt Mestaer	Rotherhithe	Great Britain	For Royal Navy.
11 December	Coquette	Coquette-class corvette		Toulon	Kingdom of France	For French Navy.
23 December	Capricieuse	Fifth rate	Charles-Jean-François Segondat-Duvernet	Lorient	Kingdom of France	For French Navy.
24 December	Purísima Concepción	First rate	Reales Astilleros de Esteiro	Ferrol	Spain	For Spanish Navy.
24 December	Vestal	Enterprise-class frigate	Robert & John Batson	Limehouse	Great Britain	For Royal Navy.
26 December	Hannibal	Fourth rate	Adams	Bucklers Hard	Great Britain	For Royal Navy.
Unknown date	Adventure	Brig	Nicholas Bools	Bridport	Great Britain	For Mr. Le Mesurier.
Unknown date	Aurora	Merchantman		Philadelphia, Pennsylvania	United States	For private owner.
Unknown date	Boyne	Merchantman		Philadelphia, Pennsylvania	United States	For private owner.
Unknown date	Cleminson	Full-rigged ship	Nicholas Bools	Bridport	Great Britain	For Ingram & Co.
Unknown date	Contractor	East Indiaman	Batson	Limehouse	Great Britain	For British East India Company.
Unknown date	Defence	Privateer			United States	For private owner.
Unknown date	Drake	Sloop-of-war	Henry Ladd	Dover	Great Britain	For Royal Navy.
Unknown date	Enkhuizen	Sixth rate	J. Hand	Enkhuizen	Dutch Republic	For Dutch Navy.
Unknown date	Fame	West Indiaman	Hilhouse	Bristol	Great Britain	For A. Clibourn.
Unknown date	General Kepple	Brig	Nicholas Bools	Bridport	Great Britain	For private owner.
Unknown date	Hazard	Merchantman		Bermuda	(Kingdom of Great Britain) Bermuda	For private owner.
Unknown date	Hoorn	Sixth rate		Hoorn	Dutch Republic	For Dutch Navy.
Unknown date	John	Merchantman		Newhaven	Great Britain	For private owner.
Unknown date	La Comtesse de Provence	Comtesse d'Artois-class frigate		Dunkirk	Kingdom of France	For private owner.
Unknown date	La Dunkerquoise	Privateer		Dunkirk	Kingdom of France	For private owner.
Unknown date	Le Duc d'Estissac	Privateer		Boulogne-sur-Mer	Kingdom of France	For François-Régis Becquerel.
Unknown date	Espérance	Fifth rate		Bordeaux	Kingdom of France	For French Navy.
Unknown date	Lively	Sloop-of-war	Thomas King	Dover	Great Britain	For Royal Navy.
Unknown date	London	East Indiaman	Perry	Blackwall	Great Britain	For British East India Company.
Unknown date	Marquis de Seignelay	Privateer		Havre de Grâce	Kingdom of France	For private owner.
Unknown date	Maarten Harpentzoon Tromp	Fourth rate		Rotterdam	Dutch Republic	For Dutch Navy.
Unknown date	Monsieur	Privateer		Havre de Grâce	Kingdom of France	For Deslandes, Laforterie-Valmont and de Vallefleur.
Unknown date	Oldenborg	Indfødsretten-class ship of the line			Denmark-Norway	For Dano-Norwegian Navy.
Unknown date	Patrioten	Frigate			Sweden	For Royal Swedish Navy.
Unknown date	Prince of Wales	Merchantman		Sidmouth	Great Britain	For John Mather.
Unknown date	Prinses Frederika Louisa Wilhelmina	Fourth rate	J. Swerus	Harlingen	Dutch Republic	For Dutch Navy.
Unknown date	Protector	Frigate		Newburyport, Massachusetts	United States	For Massachusetts State Navy.
Unknown date	San Fermín	Ship-sloop			Spain	For Spanish Navy.
Unknown date	Scourge	Sloop-of-war	Thomas Allin	Dover	Great Britain	For Royal Navy.
Unknown date	Şehbaz-ı Bahri	Fourth rate		Rhodes	Ottoman Empire	For Ottoman Navy.
Unknown date	Ship Sloop No 1	Caspian Sea-class ship sloop		Kazan	Russia	For Imperial Russian Navy.
Unknown date	Ship Sloop No 2	Caspian Sea-class ship sloop		Kazan	Russia	For Imperial Russian Navy.
Unknown date	Speedy	Whaler		River Thames	Great Britain	For Samuel Enderby & Sons.
Unknown date	Swallow	Packet ship		Bombay dockyard	India	For British East India Company.
Unknown date	Two Brothers	Merchantman	John Brockbank	Lancaster	Great Britain	For private owner.
Unknown date	Vengeance	Unrated			United States	For Continental Navy.
Unknown date	Young William	West Indiaman		Whitby	Great Britain	For George Atty.
Unknown date	Zephyr	Sloop-of-War	John Barnard	Deptford	Great Britain	For Royal Navy.
Unknown date	Name unknown	Merchantman		Philadelphia, Pennsylvania	United States	For private owner.
Unknown date	Name unknown	Full-rigged ship		Deptford Dockyard	Great Britain	For Royal Navy.
Unknown date	Name unknown	Merchantman			Kingdom of France	For private owner.
Unknown date	Name unknown	Merchantman			Kingdom of France	For private owner.
