= List of shipwrecks in 1780 =

The List of shipwrecks in 1780 includes some ships sunk, wrecked or otherwise lost during 1780.

table of contents
1780
| Jan | Feb | Mar | Apr |
| May | Jun | Jul | Aug |
| Sep | Oct | Nov | Dec |
Unknown date

== January ==
=== 2 January ===
List of shipwrecks: 2 January 1780
| Ship | State | Description |
|---|---|---|
| Nancy | Great Britain | The ship sprang a leak off Port Antonio, Jamaica and was consequently beached there. |

=== 6 January ===
List of shipwrecks: 6 January 1780
| Ship | State | Description |
|---|---|---|
| Rachel | Great Britain | The transport ship foundered in the Atlantic Ocean. Her crew were rescued. |

=== 11 January ===
List of shipwrecks: 11 January 1780
| Ship | State | Description |
|---|---|---|
| Gunton | Great Britain | The ship foundered. Her crew were rescued. She was on a voyage from New York, United States to Great Yarmouth, Norfolk. |

=== 15 January ===
List of shipwrecks: 15 January 1780
| Ship | State | Description |
|---|---|---|
| Two unnamed vessels | Great Britain | American Revolutionary War:Two schooners stuck in ice off Sandy Hook are captured and destroyed. |
| Unnamed | Great Britain | American Revolutionary War:The sloop, stuck in ice off Sandy Hook, was captured and destroyed. |

=== 16 January ===
List of shipwrecks: 16 January 1780
| Ship | State | Description |
|---|---|---|
| Santo Domingo | Spanish Navy | American Revolutionary War, Battle of Cape St. Vincent: The third rate ship of the line was sunk by HMS Ajax, HMS Edgar and HMS Marlborough (all (Kingdom of Great Britain) Royal Navy). |

=== 18 January ===
List of shipwrecks: 18 January 1780
| Ship | State | Description |
|---|---|---|
| Sally | Great Britain | The sloop was driven ashore and wrecked at Weymouth, Dorset. She was on a voyage from Liverpool, Lancashire to London. |

=== 19 January ===
List of shipwrecks: 19 January 1780
| Ship | State | Description |
|---|---|---|
| Sally | Great Britain | The ship was driven ashore and wrecked at Cork, Ireland. She was on a voyage from Liverpool, Lancashire to the West Indies. |

=== 28 January ===
List of shipwrecks: 28 January 1780
| Ship | State | Description |
|---|---|---|
| HM Cutter Lark | Great Britain | The cutter was driven ashore and wrecked on Jersey, Channel Islands. Her crew were rescued. |

=== 30 January ===
List of shipwrecks: 30 January 1780
| Ship | State | Description |
|---|---|---|
| Joseph & Betsey | Great Britain | The ship was driven ashore and wrecked on the coast of Cornwall. She was on a voyage from Emsworth, Hampshire to Cork, Ireland. |

=== 31 January ===
List of shipwrecks: 31 January 1780
| Ship | State | Description |
|---|---|---|
| Peggy | Great Britain | The ship was wrecked on the Irish coast. She was on a voyage from Liverpool, Lancashire to Belfast, County Antrim, Ireland. |

=== Unknown date ===
List of shipwrecks: Unknown date in January 1780
| Ship | State | Description |
|---|---|---|
| Arethusa | Great Britain | The ship departed from Antigua. No further trace, presumed foundered with the loss of all hands. |
| Glory | Great Britain | The ship was driven ashore and wrecked in the Isles of Scilly. She was on a voyage from Plymouth, Devon to Dublin, Ireland |
| Henry | Great Britain | The ship was wrecked on Lambay Island, County Dublin, Ireland. She was on a voyage from Liverpool, Lancashire to Dublin. |
| Mars | Dutch Republic | The ship was driven ashore near Chichester, Sussex, Great Britain. She was on a voyage from Sint Eustatius to Amsterdam. |
| Mary | Great Britain | The ship foundered in the Atlantic Ocean. She was on a voyage from New York, United States to Madeira. |
| New Newry Packet | Ireland | The ship foundered near Newry, County Antrim. She was on a voyage from Newry to Liverpool. |
| Nossa Senhora da Arrábida Santo Christo | Portugal | The ship was driven ashore at "Montruel", France with the loss of several of her crew. She was on a voyage from Lisbon to London, Great Britain. |
| Pheasant | Great Britain | The ship was lost off the Isles of Scilly. She was on a voyage from Waterford, Ireland to Poole, Dorset. |
| Two Sisters | Great Britain | The ship foundered in the Atlantic Ocean off Land's End, Cornwall. She was on a voyage from London to Dublin. |
| Unnamed | Great Britain | American Revolutionary War: The brig was driven ashore in a snowstorm at Middletown Point, New Jersey, probably on the 4th. Crew captured. |
| Unnamed | Great Britain | American Revolutionary War: The 40 gun ship was driven ashore by Americans near Egg Harbor, New Jersey. |
| Unity | Great Britain | The ship foundered in the Atlantic Ocean. Her crew were rescued by Betsey and Sally (Great Britain). Unity was on a voyage from Newfoundland, British America to Pool. |
| Vengeance | Great Britain | American Revolution: The privateer departed Savannah, Georgia on or after 10 January and vanished. |

== February ==
=== 1 February ===
List of shipwrecks: 1 February 1780
| Ship | State | Description |
|---|---|---|
| Haywood | Great Britain | The transport ship was destroyed by fire at Deptford, Kent. Ann and Elizabeth (Great Britain) was damaged. |

=== 6 February ===
List of shipwrecks: 6 February 1780
| Ship | State | Description |
|---|---|---|
| Resolution | Great Britain | The ship ran aground and was wrecked in the North Sea off Lowestoft, Suffolk. She was on a voyage from Newcastle upon Tyne, Northumberland to Portsmouth, Hampshire and Saint Kitts. |

=== 23 February ===
List of shipwrecks: 23 February 1780
| Ship | State | Description |
|---|---|---|
| Batchelor | Great Britain | The privateer was lost in a hurricane at Montego Bay, Jamaica. |
| Cornelia | United States | The ship was lost in a hurricane at Montego Bay. |
| Echo | Great Britain | The ship was lost in a hurricane at Montego Bay. |
| Hero | Great Britain | The ship was lost in a hurricane at Montego Bay. |
| Martha | Great Britain | The ship was lost in a hurricane at Montego Bay. |
| Nancy | Great Britain | The ship was lost in a hurricane at Montego Bay. |
| Orangefield | United States | The ship was lost in a hurricane at Montego Bay. |
| Petersfield | Great Britain | The ship was lost in a hurricane at Montego Bay. |
| Quebec Packet | Great Britain | The ship was lost in a hurricane at Montego Bay. |

=== 24 February ===
List of shipwrecks: 24 February 1780
| Ship | State | Description |
|---|---|---|
| Amazon | Ireland | The privateer was driven ashore and wrecked at Donaghadee, County Down. |
| Hope | Great Britain | The ship was wrecked off São Miguel Island, Azores. Her crew were rescued. She was on a voyage from Cowes, Isle of Wight to Halifax, Nova Scotia, British America. |
| Three Sisters | Great Britain | The ship was driven ashore at Donaghadee. She was on a voyage from Bristol, Gloucestershire to Belfast, County Down. |

=== 25 February ===
List of shipwrecks: 25 February 1780
| Ship | State | Description |
|---|---|---|
| Mary | Great Britain | The ship was wrecked at Holyhead, Anglesey with the loss of all but her captain. She was on a voyage from Milford, Pembrokeshire to Preston, Lancashire. |
| Sally | Great Britain | The ship was lost on the Nass Sands, in the Bristol Channel. She was on a voyage from Barnstaple, Devon to Bristol, Gloucestershire. |
| Sarah | Great Britain | The ship was driven ashore on an island in Cardigan Bay. She was on a voyage from Liverpool, Lancashire to Africa. |
| Tyne | Great Britain | The ship foundered in the North Sea off Whitby, Yorkshire. Her crew were rescued. |

=== 26 February ===
List of shipwrecks: 26 February 1780
| Ship | State | Description |
|---|---|---|
| Betsey | Great Britain | The ship was driven ashore and wrecked at Hoyle, Cheshire with the loss of fourteen or fifteen of her crew. She was on a voyage from Saint Kitts to Lancaster, Lancashire. |
| Mayflower | Great Britain | The sloop was driven ashore and wrecked at Caister-on-Sea, Norfolk with the loss of all hands. She was on a voyage from Scarborough, Yorkshire to London. |
| Speedwell | Great Britain | The sloop was driven ashore and wrecked at Caister-on-Sea with the loss of all hands. She was on a voyage from Wells-next-the-Sea, Norfolk to London. |

=== 27 February ===
List of shipwrecks: 27 February 1780
| Ship | State | Description |
|---|---|---|
| Good Intent | (Denmark) Danish Asiatic Company | The East Indiaman caught fire, exploded and sank at Copenhagen with the loss of many lives. |
| HMS Leviathan | (Kingdom of Great Britain) Royal Navy | The storeship sprang a leak and foundered in the Atlantic Ocean. Her crew were rescued by HM hired armed ship Howe ( (Kingdom of Great Britain) Royal Navy) and other ships. HMS Leviathan was on a voyage from Jamaica to The Downs. |
| St Joanna | Great Britain | The ship was in collision with Friendship (Great Britain) in The Downs and was abandoned by her crew. |

=== Unknown date ===
List of shipwrecks: Unknown date in February 1780
| Ship | State | Description |
|---|---|---|
| Catharine | Ireland | The ship was lost at Castlehaven, County Cork. She was on a voyage from New York, United States to Castlehaven. |
| Endeavour | Great Britain | The brig ran aground and was wrecked in the Thames Estuary off the Isle of Grain, Kent. She was on a voyage from London to Plymouth, Devon. |
| Fair Trader | Great Britain | The ship was lost near Boscastle, Cornwall. Her crew were rescued. She was on a voyage from Bristol, Gloucestershire to Boscastle. |
| Free Mason | Great Britain | The schooner was wrecked near Canso, Nova Scotia. Her 19 crew made it to shore but all but 3 died due to lack of food and shelter, the 3 surviving by cannibalism. |
| Manchester | Great Britain | The ship was lost on the Burbo Bank, in Liverpool Bay. She was on a voyage from Londonderry, Ireland to Liverpool, Lancashire. |
| Philo | Ireland | The ship was lost at Castlehaven. She was on a voyage from Lisbon, Portugal to Waterford. |
| Riviera de Genoa | Spain | The ship was driven ashore and sank at Ostend, Dutch Republic. She was on a voyage from Alicante to Ostend. |
| Susanna | Great Britain | The ship foundered in the Atlantic Ocean a few days before 25 February. Her crew were rescued by Morant (Great Britain). She was on a voyage from Jamaica to a British port. |
| Vrow Margaretta | Dutch Republic | The ship was driven ashore and wrecked near Portloe, Cornwall. She was on a voyage from Sint Eustatius to Amsterdam. |

== March ==
=== 2 March ===
List of shipwrecks: 2 March 1780
| Ship | State | Description |
|---|---|---|
| Mercury | Great Britain | The ship was driven ashore on Long Island, Rhode Island, United States. She was on a voyage from New York, United States to Portugal. Mercury was later taken in to New York, where she was condemned. |

=== 9 March ===
List of shipwrecks: 9 March 1780
| Ship | State | Description |
|---|---|---|
| British Queen | Great Britain | The ship was destroyed by fire in the River Thames. She was on a voyage from London to Quebec, British America. |

=== 20 March ===
List of shipwrecks: 20 March 1780
| Ship | State | Description |
|---|---|---|
| HM hired armed ship Howe | (Kingdom of Great Britain) Royal Navy | The ship was driven ashore on the south coast of the Isle of Wight. All on board were rescued. |

=== Unknown date ===
List of shipwrecks: Unknown date in March 1780
| Ship | State | Description |
|---|---|---|
| Adventure | Great Britain | The ship was lost on the coast of Yorkshire. Her crew were rescued. She was on a voyage from Borrowstounness, Lothian to Rotterdam, Dutch Republic. |
| Ann | Great Britain | The ship was driven ashore near Pool, Dorset. She was on a voyage from Guernsey, Channel Islands to London. |
| Clarendon | Great Britain | The ship was driven ashore in the River Mersey. She was on a voyage from Jamaica to Liverpool, Lancashire. |
| Crook | Great Britain | The ship was lost near "Harley". She was on a voyage from London to South Shields, County Durham. |
| Dove | Great Britain | The ship was driven ashore at Beachy Head, Sussex. She was on a voyage from Dublin, Ireland to London. |
| Hannah and Nancy | Ireland | The ship was wrecked in the Shetland Islands, Great Britain. She was on a voyage from Dublin to "Dronton". |
| Hercules | Ireland | The ship was lost near St. Ubes, Portugal. She was on a voyage from Dublin to St. Ubes and Cork. |
| Jon Jonge | Hamburg | The ship was lost near Cádiz, Spain. She was on a voyage from Hamburg to Genoa and Livorno, Grand Duchy of Tuscany. |
| La Vulture | France | The ship, a prize of the privateer Pallas (Great Britain), was lost on the coast of Ireland with the loss of several of her crew. |
| Nossa Senhora do Carmo e São José Baptista e Almas | Portugal | The ship foundered in the Bay of Biscay off the coast of Spain. Her crew survived. She was on a voyage from Lisbon to Dublin, Ireland. |
| Prince Frederick | (Denmark) Norway | The ship was wrecked on the Isle of Man. She was on a voyage from Liverpool to Christiansand. |
| St. Antonio | Dutch Republic | The ship was driven ashore on the south coast of the Isle of Wight, Great Britain. She was on a voyage from Falmouth, Cornwall, Great Britain to Ostend. |
| HMS Tapageur | (Kingdom of Great Britain) Royal Navy | The Mutin-class cutter was wrecked in Carenage Bay, Saint Lucia. |
| Vrow Christina | Denmark | The ship was lost near Newhaven, Sussex, Great Britain. She was on a voyage from Saint Thomas, Virgin Islands to Ireland and Copenhagen. |
| Vrow Elizabeth | Dutch Republic | The ship was driven ashore and wrecked in Bigbury Bay. She was on a voyage from Sint Maarten to Amsterdam. |
| William | Great Britain | The ship was wrecked on a sandbank off Wexford, Ireland. She was on a voyage from Newry, County Antrim, Ireland to London. |
| Young Dragon | Great Britain | The ship was wrecked near Baltimore, County Cork, Ireland with the loss of all but one of her crew. She was on a voyage from Liverpool to Barbados. |

== April ==
=== 1 April ===
List of shipwrecks: 1 April 1780
| Ship | State | Description |
|---|---|---|
| Leevart | Dutch Republic | The ship was wrecked on the Goodwin Sands, Kent, Great Britain. Her crew were rescued. She was on a voyage from Amsterdam to Lisbon, Portugal. |

=== 9 April ===
List of shipwrecks: 9 April 1780
| Ship | State | Description |
|---|---|---|
| Betty Greg | Great Britain | The ship was wrecked at Cork, Ireland. |

=== 15 April ===
List of shipwrecks: 15 April 1780
| Ship | State | Description |
|---|---|---|
| Unnamed | United States | American Revolutionary War: The brig was driven ashore at Deal Beach, New Jersey while trying to avoid capture by HMS Vulture ( (Kingdom of Great Britain) Royal Navy). |
| Unnamed | United States | American Revolutionary War: The brig was driven ashore at Sandy Hook while trying to avoid capture by HMS Galatea ( (Kingdom of Great Britain) Royal Navy). |

=== 17 April ===
List of shipwrecks: 17 April 1780
| Ship | State | Description |
|---|---|---|
| Fame | Great Britain | The ship was lost on the coast of Friesland, Dutch Republic. Her crew were rescued. She was on a voyage from. Great Yarmouth, Norfolk to Amsterdam, Dutch Republic. |
| Nancy | Great Britain | The ship was wrecked on the French coast. Her crew were rescued. She was on a voyage from Liverpool, Lancashire to London. |
| Success | Great Britain | The ship was lost on the coast of Friesland. Her crew were rescued. She was on a voyage from Great Yarmouth to Amsterdam. |

=== 23 April ===
List of shipwrecks: 23 April 1780
| Ship | State | Description |
|---|---|---|
| Four Sisters | Great Britain | The ship was lost in the North Sea 2 leagues (6 nautical miles (11 km) west of Domesnes, Norway. Her crew were rescued. She was on a voyage from Dundee, Perthshire to Riga, Russia. |

=== Unknown date ===
List of shipwrecks: Unknown date in April 1780
| Ship | State | Description |
|---|---|---|
| Anna Margaretta and Maria | Dutch Republic | The ship was lost near Rye, Sussex, Great Britain. She was on a voyage from Sint Eustatius to Amsterdam |
| Black Prince | Great Britain | The privateer was wrecked near Cherbourg, France. Her crew were rescued. |
| Blandford | Great Britain | The ship was wrecked near Weymouth, Dorset. She was on a voyage from Falmouth, Cornwall to London. |
| Hope | Ireland | The ship was lost on the west coast of Ireland. She was on a voyage from Newry, County Antrim to Cork. |
| Johanna Henrietta | Sweden | The ship sank in the River Thames at Blackwall, Middlesex, Great Britain. She was on a voyage from Stockholm to London. |
| Mary Louisa | Grand Duchy of Tuscany | The poleacre was driven ashore near Étaples, France. She was on a voyage from Livorno to London. |
| Richard | Great Britain | The ship was lost near Riga, Russia. She was on a voyage from Hull, Yorkshire to Riga. |
| Thames | Great Britain | The ship ran aground off "Belem". She was on a voyage from London to Lisbon, Portugal. |

== May ==
=== 9 May ===
List of shipwrecks: 9 May 1780
| Ship | State | Description |
|---|---|---|
| Denbigh | Great Britain | The transport ship was driven ashore in the Cattewater. |
| Resolution | Great Britain | The ship was driven ashore and wrecked in Tor Bay. She was on a voyage from Torquay, Devon to Newfoundland, British America. |

=== 11 May ===
List of shipwrecks: 11 May 1780
| Ship | State | Description |
|---|---|---|
| USS Queen of France | (United States) Continental Navy | American Revolutionary War: The frigate was scuttled at Charleston, South Carolina to prevent capture by the British. |

=== 25 May ===
List of shipwrecks: 25 May 1780
| Ship | State | Description |
|---|---|---|
| Bom Jesus do Além | Portugal | The ship was wrecked on Warden Ledge, Isle of Wight, Great Britain. |

=== 31 May ===
List of shipwrecks: 31 May 1780
| Ship | State | Description |
|---|---|---|
| Aurora | Great Britain | The ship was run down and sunk in the Atlantic Ocean between Land's End, Cornwall and the Isles of Scilly by a Prussian vessel. Her crew were rescued. She was on a voyage from Dartmouth, Devon to Waterford, Ireland. |
| Nossa Senhore de Conceicao St. Antonio e Almas | Great Britain | The ship was lost near Sandwich, Kent, Great Britain with the loss of four of her crew. She was on a voyage from Amsterdam, Dutch Republic to Lisbon. |

=== Unknown date ===
List of shipwrecks: Unknown date in May 1780
| Ship | State | Description |
|---|---|---|
| Maria | Prussia | The ship was driven ashore on Bornholm, Denmark. She was on a voyage from Königsberg to London, Great Britain. |
| Pro Patria | Great Britain | The ship was driven ashore in the River Thames at Wapping, Middlesex. She was on a voyage from Gothenburg, Sweden to London. |
| Stadt van Brussel | Dutch Republic | The ship ran aground and was severely damaged at Ostend. She was on a voyage from Ostend to Sint Eustatius. |
| Success | Great Britain | The ship was holed by her anchor and was consequently beached at Elsineur, Denmark. She was later refloated and taken in to Copenhagen, Denmark for repairs. |
| Valliant | Great Britain | The ship was driven ashore and wrecked at Chepstow, Monmouthshire. |

== June ==
=== 9 June ===
List of shipwrecks: 9 June 1780
| Ship | State | Description |
|---|---|---|
| Admiral Duff | (Kingdom of Great Britain) Royal Navy | American Revolution:The ship was sunk by frigate USS Protector (United States Navy) when her stern was blown off in an explosion off Boston. |

=== 10 June ===
List of shipwrecks: 10 June 1780
| Ship | State | Description |
|---|---|---|
| Mayflower | Great Britain | The ship was run down and sunk in the North Sea off Whitby, Yorkshire. Her crew were rescued. She was on a voyage from London to Newcastle upon Tyne, Northumberland. |

=== 18 June ===
List of shipwrecks: 18 June 1780
| Ship | State | Description |
|---|---|---|
| Nataliya (Наталия, 'Natalie') | Imperial Russian Navy | The brigantine was driven ashore by a tsunami and wrecked on Urup, Kuril Islands. |

=== Unknown date ===
List of shipwrecks: Unknown date in June 1780
| Ship | State | Description |
|---|---|---|
| Adventure | Great Britain | The ship was run down and sunk in the River Thames at Limehouse, Middlesex by a collier. She was on a voyage from London to Cork, Ireland. |
| Betsey | Great Britain | The ship was driven ashore and wrecked on the coast of Cornwall. |
| Hannah | Dutch Republic | The ship was destroyed by fire at Brielle. She was on a voyage from Rotterdam to Hull, Yorkshire, Great Britain. |
| Liberty | Great Britain | The ship was driven ashore and wrecked on the coast of Cornwall. |

== July ==
=== 7 July ===
List of shipwrecks: 7 July 1780
| Ship | State | Description |
|---|---|---|
| Christiana Margretta | Sweden | The ship was destroyed by fire in the Tagus. |

=== Unknown date ===
List of shipwrecks: Unknown date in July 1780
| Ship | State | Description |
|---|---|---|
| Capricieux | French Navy | Anglo-French War (1778–83): The frigate was captured by HMS Licorne and HMS Prudente (both (Kingdom of Great Britain) Royal Navy) after an engagement in which she lost 52 men. She was scuttled due to damage sustained. |
| Comte de Maurepas | France | Anglo-French War (1778–83): The privateer was sunk in the English Channel off Portland, Dorset, Great Britain by HMS Southampton ( (Kingdom of Great Britain) Royal Navy). Her 80 crew were rescued. |
| Santa Fee | United States | The ship was driven ashore at Sunbury, Georgia in a hurricane. |
| St Nicholas | Portugal | The ship was driven ashore and wrecked near Plymouth, Devon, Kingdom of Great Britain. |

== August ==
=== 7 August ===
List of shipwrecks: 7 August 1780
| Ship | State | Description |
|---|---|---|
| Frotune-teller | Great Britain | The privateer was lost off Barbuda. Her crew were rescued. |

=== Unknown date ===
List of shipwrecks: Unknown date in August 1780
| Ship | State | Description |
|---|---|---|
| Admiral Duffe | Great Britain | American Revolutionary War: The ship exploded and sank in an engagement with an America privateer. |
| De Smyrna | Dutch Republic | The ship was driven ashore and wrecked at "Hestose", Cornwall, Kingdom of Great Britain. She was on a voyage from Smyrna, Ottoman Empire to Rotterdam. |
| Dublin | Great Britain | Anglo-French War (1778–83): The ship was captured and burnt by a French privateer. She was on a voyage from the Clyde to Gothenburg, Sweden. |
| Ederyg and Elizabeth | Danzig | The ship was lost near St. Lucar, Spain. She was on a voyage from Danzig to Cádiz, Spain. |
| Jonge Peters | Dutch Republic | The ship was wrecked on the Goodwin Sands, Kent, Great Britain. She was on a voyage from Ostend to London, Great Britain. |
| Resolution | Great Britain | The privateer was sunk in the Atlantic Ocean off the Canary Islands with the loss of about twenty of her crew. |

== September ==
=== 2 September ===
List of shipwrecks: 2 September 1780
| Ship | State | Description |
|---|---|---|
| Friendship | Great Britain | The ship foundered in the Atlantic Ocean. Her crew were rescued by Jenny (Great Britain). Friendship was on a voyage from Saint Kitts to London. |

=== 7 September ===
List of shipwrecks: 7 September 1780
| Ship | State | Description |
|---|---|---|
| Unnamed | United States | American Revolutionary War:The brig was run ashore at Egg Harbor, New Jersey by frigate HMS Iris ( (Kingdom of Great Britain) Royal Navy). |

=== 9 September ===
List of shipwrecks: 9 September 1780
| Ship | State | Description |
|---|---|---|
| Yevstafy (Евстафий, 'Eustathios') | Imperial Russian Navy | The pink was wrecked on a skerry 3 nautical miles (5.6 km) off Whalsay, Shetland Islands, Great Britain with the loss of all but five of the 195 people on board. |
| Friendship | Great Britain | The transport ship foundered in the Atlantic Ocean. She was on a voyage from New York, United States to London. |

=== 29 September ===
List of shipwrecks: 29 September 1780
| Ship | State | Description |
|---|---|---|
| HDMS Printz Friderich | Royal Dano-Norwegian Navy | The ship-of-the-line ran aground on Kobbergrund shoal in the Kattegat and was a total loss. |

=== 30 September ===
List of shipwrecks: 30 September 1780
| Ship | State | Description |
|---|---|---|
| Porter | Great Britain | The ship was wrecked on the west coast of Bornholm, Denmark. She was on a voyage from Hull, Yorkshire to Danzig. |

=== Unknown date ===
List of shipwrecks: Unknown date in September 1780
| Ship | State | Description |
|---|---|---|
| Nossa Senhora da Conceição da Figurido | Portugal | The ship lost her rudder at Memel, Prussia and was driven ashore on or before 23 September. She was on a voyage from São Miguel Island, Azores to Memel. |
| Tryal | Great Britain | The ship was wrecked in the Isles of Scilly. She was on a voyage from Saint Kitts to Bristol, Gloucestershire. |
| Valiant | France | The brig was captured by the privateers Enterprize and Stag (both Great Britain). She was sent in to Liverpool, Lancashire, Great Britain but was lost going into port. There was one survivor. |

== October ==
=== 4 October ===
List of shipwrecks: 4 October 1780
| Ship | State | Description |
|---|---|---|
| HMS Phoenix | (Kingdom of Great Britain) Royal Navy | HMS Phoenix Great Hurricane of 1780: The fifth rate foundered off the coast of Cuba with the loss of twenty of her 260 crew. Survivors landed on Cuba and were later rescued by HMS Porcupine ( (Kingdom of Great Britain) Royal Navy). |

=== 5 October ===
List of shipwrecks: 5 October 1780
| Ship | State | Description |
|---|---|---|
| HMS Scarborough | (Kingdom of Great Britain) Royal Navy | Great Hurricane of 1780: The ship foundered off San Domingo with the loss of all hands. |
| HMS Stirling Castle | (Kingdom of Great Britain) Royal Navy | The Worcester-class ship of the line was wrecked on the Silver Keys, off Cap François, Cuba with the loss of most of her crew. Four survivors were rescued by Aurora (United States). |

=== 7 October ===
List of shipwrecks: 7 October 1780
| Ship | State | Description |
|---|---|---|
| Molly | Great Britain | The ship foundered in the Kattegat. Her crew were rescued. She was on a voyage from "Colburg" to London. |

=== 8 October ===
List of shipwrecks: 8 October 1780
| Ship | State | Description |
|---|---|---|
| Aurora | Great Britain | The ship was lost near Point Lynas, Anglesey with the loss of twelve of the sixteen people on board. She was on a voyage from Dublin, Ireland to Liverpool, Lancashire. |
| Friendship | Ireland | The ship sprang a leak in the Atlantic Ocean and was abandoned by her crew. She was on a voyage from New York, United States to Cork. |

=== 9 October ===
List of shipwrecks: 9 October 1780
| Ship | State | Description |
|---|---|---|
| Aligator | Great Britain | The privateer was lost on the French coast. Her crew were rescued. |
| John & Elizabeth | Great Britain | The ship was driven ashore at Great Yarmouth, Norfolk with the loss of two lives. She was on a voyage from London to Leith, Lothian. |

=== 10 October ===
List of shipwrecks: 10 October 1780
| Ship | State | Description |
|---|---|---|
| Georgia | Great Britain | The ship foundered in the English Channel off Beachy Head, Sussex. |

=== 11 October ===
List of shipwrecks: 11 October 1780
| Ship | State | Description |
|---|---|---|
| HMS Ajax | (Kingdom of Great Britain) Royal Navy | Great Hurricane of 1780: The third rate ship of the line was driven ashore and damaged at Saint Lucia. |
| HMS Amazon | (Kingdom of Great Britain) Royal Navy | Great Hurricane of 1780: The frigate was driven ashore and damaged at Saint Lucia with the loss of 30 lives. |
| HMS Andromeda | (Kingdom of Great Britain) Royal Navy | Great Hurricane of 1780: The Enterprise-class frigate foundered off Martinique with the loss of most of her crew. |
| HMS Beaver's Prize | (Kingdom of Great Britain) Royal Navy | Great Hurricane of 1780: The ship was driven ashore and wrecked on Saint Lucia. Seventeen of her crew survived. |
| HMS Blanche | (Kingdom of Great Britain) Royal Navy | Great Hurricane of 1780: The fifth rate was lost at Saint Lucia. |
| HMS Brune | (Kingdom of Great Britain) Royal Navy | Great Hurricane of 1780: The Blonde-class frigate was damaged at Saint Lucia. |
| HMS Chamelion | (Kingdom of Great Britain) Royal Navy | Great Hurricane of 1780: The Sloop-of-War was driven into HMS Deal Castle ( (Kingdom of Great Britain) Royal Navy) and foundered in Gros Islet Bay, Saint Lucia. |
| HMS Deal Castle | (Kingdom of Great Britain) Royal Navy | HMS Deal Castle. Great Hurricane of 1780: The Squirrel-class post ship foundered in Gros Islet Bay after HMS Chamelion ( (Kingdom of Great Britain) Royal Navy) was driven into her. |
| HMS Endymion | Great Britain | Great Hurricane of 1780: The Man-of-War was lost at Martinique with the loss of all hands. |
| Junon | French Navy | The Charmante-class frigate was wrecked in a typhoon. |
| HMS Laurel | (Kingdom of Great Britain) Royal Navy | Great Hurricane of 1780: The sixth rate frigate was wrecked at Martinique with the loss of all but twelve of her crew. |
| HMS Montagu | (Kingdom of Great Britain) Royal Navy | Great Hurricane of 1780: The third rate ship of the line was driven ashore and damaged at Saint Lucia. |
| HMS Vengeance | (Kingdom of Great Britain) Royal Navy | Great Hurricane of 1780: The third rate ship of the line was driven ashore and damaged at Saint Lucia. |

=== 12 October ===
List of shipwrecks: 12 October 1780
| Ship | State | Description |
|---|---|---|
| Bellona | Great Britain | The ship was wrecked in a hurricane at Saint Kitts. |
| Brothers | Great Britain | The ship was wrecked in a hurricane at Saint Kitts. |
| Eleanor | Great Britain | The ship was wrecked in a hurricane at Saint Kitts. |
| Minerva | Great Britain | The ship was wrecked in a hurricane at Saint Kitts. |
| Rowley | Great Britain | The ship was wrecked in a hurricane at Saint Kitts. |

=== 19 October ===
List of shipwrecks: 19 October 1780
| Ship | State | Description |
|---|---|---|
| Emperor | Great Britain | The ship foundered in the Atlantic Ocean (41°30′N 35°00′W) with the loss of all but one of her crew. She was on a voyage from Jamaica to London. |
| Helena | Great Britain | The ship was driven ashore and wrecked at Ostend, Dutch Republic. Her crew were rescued. |
| Richard | Great Britain | The ship was driven ashore on Chiswell Bank, Dorset. She was on a voyage from Porto, Portugal to Plymouth, Devon, then Weymouth and Pool, Dorset. |

=== 22 October ===
List of shipwrecks: 22 October 1780
| Ship | State | Description |
|---|---|---|
| Benjamin | Great Britain | The ship was run down and sunk in the River Thames at Blackwall, Middlesex. |

=== 23 October ===
List of shipwrecks: 23 October 1780
| Ship | State | Description |
|---|---|---|
| Slava Rossii (Слава России, 'Glory of Russia') | Imperial Russian Navy | The ship of the line was wrecked at Levant Island, near Toulon, France, with the loss of eleven of the 457 people on board. She was on a voyage from Mahón, Mallorca, Spain to Livorno, Grand Duchy of Tuscany. The wreck was discovered in 1947 and excavated 1980–81. |
| Surprise | Great Britain | The ship was driven ashore and wrecked at Hurst Castle, Hampshire. She was on a voyage from Southampton to Guernsey, Channel Islands. |

=== 31 October ===
List of shipwrecks: 31 October 1780
| Ship | State | Description |
|---|---|---|
| HMS Ontario | (Kingdom of Great Britain) Royal Navy | The sixth rate sloop-of-war foundered in Lake Ontario with the loss of about 130 lives. |

=== Unknown date ===
List of shipwrecks: Unknown date in October 1780
| Ship | State | Description |
|---|---|---|
| Abigail | Dutch Republic | Great Hurricane of 1780: The snow was driven ashore and wrecked on Grenada. |
| Adonis | (Dutch Republic) Sint Eustatius | Great Hurricane of 1780: The schooner was damaged at Grenada. |
| Anna | Spain | The ship capsized at San Sebastián. She was on a voyage from Ostend, Dutch Republic to San Sebastián and Cádiz. |
| Anne Gertrude Margarette | Dutch Republic | Great Hurricane of 1780: The full-rigged ship was driven ashore and wrecked on Grenada. |
| Aston Hall | Great Britain | Great Hurricane of 1780: The ship was wrecked at Jamaica. |
| Britannia | Great Britain | Great Hurricane of 1780: The ship was blown out of Barbados. No further trace, presumed foundered with the loss of all hands. |
| Cecelia | Denmark | The ship was driven ashore at Elsineur, Denmark. She was on a voyage from the West Indies to Copenhagen. |
| Charlotte | Great Britain | The ship was driven ashore at the Mumbles, Glamorgan. She was on a voyage from Bristol, Gloucestershire to Cork, Ireland. |
| Comte de Durat | France | Great Hurricane of 1780: The full-rigged ship was driven ashore and wrecked at Grenada. |
| Diana | (Kingdom of Great Britain) Guernsey | The ship was driven ashore and wrecked on the coast of Brittany, France. She was on a voyage from Bordeaux, France to Guernsey. |
| Edward | Great Britain | Great Hurricane of 1780: The ship was blown out of Carlisle Bay, Barbados. She was severely damaged and consequently had to be beached on Barbados. |
| Elizabeth Helena | Dutch Republic | Great Hurricane of 1780: The full-rigged ship was damaged at Grenada. |
| Elliot | Great Britain | Great Hurricane of 1780: The ship was wrecked at Jamaica. |
| Good Del | Prussia | The ship was wrecked on Bornholm, Denmark. She was on a voyage from London, Great Britain to Rugenwalde. |
| Helmsley | Great Britain | The ship was driven ashore and wrecked at Great Yarmouth, Norfolk. She was on a voyage from Saint Petersburg, Russia to London. |
| Henry | Great Britain | Great Hurricane of 1780: The ship was wrecked at Jamaica. |
| John & Betty | Great Britain | The ship was driven ashore and wrecked at Marazion, Cornwall. |
| Lisbon Paquet | Great Britain | The ship was lost near "Warburg". She was on a voyage from Hull, Yorkshire to Saint Petersburg. |
| Margaret | Great Britain | Great Hurricane of 1780: The full-rigged ship was wrecked on the Zeipne, La Bay. |
| Minerva | Great Britain | Great Hurricane of 1780: The ship was blown out of Montserrat. She sprang a leak and put into Antigua for repairs. |
| Neptune | Dutch Republic | Great Hurricane of 1780: The snow was driven ashore and wrecked on Grenada. |
| Nossa Senhora Da Lapa | Portugal | The ship was driven ashore near St. Ubes. She was on a voyage from Cádiz to Ostend. |
| Phoenix | Dutch Republic | Great Hurricane of 1780: The full-rigged ship was driven ashore and wrecked at Grenada with the loss of a crew member. |
| Prince Constantine | Russia | The ship was lost near Karlskrona, Sweden. She was on a voyage from Saint Petersburg to Bordeaux, France. |
| Prince Frederick Adolph | Sweden | Great Hurricane of 1780: The full-rigged ship was driven ashore and wrecked on Grenada. |
| Princess Royal | Great Britain | Great Hurricane of 1780: The ship was wrecked at Jamaica. |
| HDMS Prinds Frederick | Royal Danish Navy | The Man-of-War was wrecked on Læsø with the loss of several of her crew. |
| Revenge | Great Britain | Great Hurricane of 1780: The ship was blown out of Saint Kitts and was subsequently wrecked on the coast of Puerto Rico. |
| Roseau | Great Britain | Great Hurricane of 1780: The schooner was severely damaged at Grenada. |
| Royal Gorse | (Kingdom of Great Britain) Grenada | Great Hurricane of 1780: The full-rigged ship was driven ashore and wrecked on Grenada. |
| Sally | Great Britain | Great Hurricane of 1780 The ship was blown out of Saint Kitts. No further trace, presumed foundered with the loss of all hands. |
| Three Friends | (Dutch Republic) Sint Eustatius | Great Hurricane of 1780: The brig was driven ashore and wrecked on Grenada. |
| HMS Thunderer | (Kingdom of Great Britain) Royal Navy | Great Hurricane of 1780: The third rate ship of the line foundered in the West Indies. |
| Two Bothers | Great Britain | The ship was driven ashore and wrecked at Dungeness, Kent. She was on a voyage from Newcastle upon Tyne, Northumberland to Jersey, Channel Islands. |
| Two Sisters | France | Great Hurricane of 1780: The full-rigged ship was driven ashore and wrecked at Grenada. |
| William Burr | Ireland | American Revolutionary War: The ship was lost in the Mull of Galloway following an engagement with an American privateer. She was on a voyage from Arkhangelsk, Russia to Dublin. |
| Wynhandelaet | Dutch Republic | Great Hurricane of 1780: The ship was wrecked at Sint Maarten. She was on a voyage from Sint Maarten to Cork. |
| Zewreight | Dutch Republic | Great Hurricane of 1780: The full-rigged ship was driven ashore and wrecked at Grand Povre. |

== November ==
=== 1 November ===
List of shipwrecks: 1 November 1780
| Ship | State | Description |
|---|---|---|
| Hedwig Elizabeth | Sweden | The ship was wrecked on Bornholm, Denmark. She was on a voyage from Stockholm to Dublin, Ireland. |

=== 4 November ===
List of shipwrecks: 4 November 1780
| Ship | State | Description |
|---|---|---|
| Friendship | Great Britain | The ship was wrecked on the north coast of Scotland. She was on a voyage from Stockholm, Sweden to "North Faro". |

=== 7 November ===
List of shipwrecks: 7 November 1780
| Ship | State | Description |
|---|---|---|
| Ann and Mary | Great Britain | The ship was wrecked at Elsinore, Denmark. Her crew were rescued. She was on a voyage from London to Saint Petersburg, Russia. |
| Winburg | Grand Duchy of Tuscany | The ship was driven ashore at Tangesola, Spain. She was on a voyage from Livorno to Dublin, Ireland. |

=== 10 November ===
List of shipwrecks: 10 November 1780
| Ship | State | Description |
|---|---|---|
| Crown | Great Britain | The ship was driven ashore and wrecked on Öland, Sweden. She was on a voyage from Riga, Russia to Great Yarmouth, Norfolk. |
| São João Baptista | Portugal | The ship was wrecked on Gotland, Sweden. She was on a voyage from Saint Petersburg, Russia to São Miguel Island, Azores. |

=== 23 November ===
List of shipwrecks: 23 November 1780
| Ship | State | Description |
|---|---|---|
| HMS Hussar | (Kingdom of Great Britain) Royal Navy | The sixth rate frigate struck Pot Rock, in Long Island Sound, and foundered with the loss of 70 American prisoners. Her crew survived. |

=== 26 November ===
List of shipwrecks: 26 November 1780
| Ship | State | Description |
|---|---|---|
| HMS Sartine | (Kingdom of Great Britain) Royal Navy | The fifth rate frigate ran aground and sank off Mangalore, India. |

=== Unknown date ===
List of shipwrecks: Unknown date in November 1780
| Ship | State | Description |
|---|---|---|
| Bom Sucesso | Portugal | The ship was wrecked on the Mort Stone. Her crew were rescued. She was on a voyage from Faro, Portugal to Bristol, Gloucestershire, Great Britain. |
| Briton | Great Britain | The ship was wrecked on the coast of Scotland. She was on a voyage from Onega, Russia to Liverpool, Lancashire. |
| Diana | Stettin | The ship was lost near Quimper, France. She was on a voyage from Bordeaux, France to Guernsey, Channel Islands. |
| Dordzechts Welvaren | Russia | The ship was wrecked on Bornholm, Denmark. She was on a voyage from Riga to Lisbon, Portugal. |
| Friendship | Great Britain | The ship was lost at Espoo, Sweden. She was on a voyage from Stockton on Tees, County Durham to Saint Petersburg, Russia. |
| Goede Vriendschap | Great Britain | The ship was lost near Skagen, Denmark. Her crew were rescued. She was on a voyage from Riga to Amsterdam. |
| Hope | Danzig | The ship was lost off the Isle of Man with the loss of six of her crew. |
| John and Ann | Great Britain | The ship was lost in Carnarvon Bay with the loss of all hands. She was on a voyage from Jamaica to Liverpool. |
| Kitty | Great Britain | The ship was driven ashore at Harwich, Essex. |
| Margaret | Great Britain | The ship capsized in the North Sea off Whitby, Yorkshire with some loss of live. |
| Recovery | Great Britain | The ship was wrecked on the coast of Cornwall with the loss of five of her crew. She was on a voyage from Dublin, Ireland to London. |
| Margery | Great Britain | The ship was driven ashore near Banff, Aberdeenshire. She was on a voyage from Gothenburg to a Scottish port. |
| Rodney | Great Britain | The ship was driven ashore and wrecked in the River Thames at Gravesend, Kent. She was on a voyage from London to the West Indies. |
| St Lazara | France | The ship foundered in the Gulf of Finland. She was on a voyage from Saint Petersburg to Bordeaux. |
| Victoria | Sweden | The ship was lost near Karlskrona. She was on a voyage from Stockholm to Plymouth, Devon, Great Britain. |

== December ==
=== 5 December ===
List of shipwrecks: 5 December 1780
| Ship | State | Description7 |
|---|---|---|
| St. Lawrence | Great Britain | The brigantine was wrecked on Cape Breton Island, Nova Scotia, British North America. Her fourteen crew survived. She was on a voyage from Quebec City, British North America to New York, United States. |

=== 18 December ===
List of shipwrecks: 18 December 1780
| Ship | State | Description |
|---|---|---|
| Principessa Sofia Frederica | (Denmark) | Danish Asiatic Company: The East Indiaman was destroyed by fire at Whampo, China. |

=== 19 December ===
List of shipwrecks: 19 December 1780
| Ship | State | Description |
|---|---|---|
| Betsey and Valentine | Great Britain | The ship was wrecked on the Gunfleet Sand, in the North Sea off the coast of Essex with the loss of four of her crew. She was on a voyage from Wells-next-the-Sea, Norfolk to Schiedam or Rotterdam, Dutch Republic. |

=== 31 December ===
List of shipwrecks: 31 December 1780
| Ship | State | Description |
|---|---|---|
| Trimmer | Great Britain | The privateer caught fire, exploded and sank at Mahón, Menorca. |

=== Unknown date ===
List of shipwrecks: Unknown date in December 1780
| Ship | State | Description |
|---|---|---|
| Alice | Great Britain | The ship was driven ashore in Dungarvan Bay. She was on a voyage from London to Londonderry, Ireland and Glasgow, Renfrewshire. |
| Catharina Dorothea | Prussia | The ship was driven ashore near Stettin. She was on a voyage from Memel to Bordeaux, France. |
| Charming Molly | Great Britain | The ship foundered in the Atlantic Ocean off the Isles of Scilly. She was on a voyage from Weymouth, Dorset to Dublin, Ireland. |
| Dart | Great Britain | The privateer was wrecked at Madeira with the loss of her captain. |
| Endeavour | Great Britain | Anglo-French War (1778–83): The ship was captured by a privateer and was subsequently lost near Saint-Malo, France. She was on a voyage from Falmouth, Cornwall to Bristol, Gloucestershire. |
| Granby | Great Britain | The ship struck rocks and was wrecked at South Shields, County Durham. Her crew were rescued. She was on a voyage from Stockton on Tees to South Shields. |
| Jenny | Ireland | The ship was wrecked on the coast of Scotland. She was on a voyage from Christiansand, Norway to Londonderry. |
| Senhora da Encarnação e Santo Christo | Portugal | The ship was lost off Cherbourg, France. She was on a voyage from London to Lisbon. |

== Unknown date ==
List of shipwrecks: Unknown date in 1780
| Ship | State | Description |
|---|---|---|
| Adventure | Great Britain | American Revolutionary War: The ship was driven ashore by an American privateer at St. John's, Newfoundland, British America and was wrecked. She was on a voyage from Sint Eustatius to Newfoundland. |
| Ann | Great Britain | The ship was wrecked on the Île d'Orléans, in the Saint Lawrence River. She was on a voyage from Quebec, British America to Barbados. |
| Aurora | Ireland | The ship was driven out of Charles Town, South Carolina, United States. No further trace, presumed foundered with the loss of all hands. She was on a voyage from Cork to New York, United States. |
| Bell | Great Britain | The ship sprang a leak in the Saint Lawrence River and was lost. She was on a voyage from Quebec to London. |
| Blossom | Great Britain | The ship was struck by lightning and was consequently condemned. She was on a voyage from Liverpool, Lancashire to Africa and the West Indies. |
| Bristol | Great Britain | The ship was lost at Antigua. She was on a voyage from Barbados to Bristol, Gloucestershire. |
| Britannia | Great Britain | The ship foundered in the Atlantic Ocean. She was on a voyage from London to New York. |
| Buck | Great Britain | Anglo-French War (1778–83): The privateer was sunk off Candia, Crete in an engagement with Sérieuse (French Navy). Her crew were taken prisoner. |
| Catharina | Dutch Republic | The ship was destroyed by fire at Sint Eustatius. Se was on a voyage from Amsterdam to Sint Eustatius. |
| Ceres | Great Britain | The ship was lost on Barbuda. She was on a voyage from London to Antigua. |
| Ceres | Great Britain | The ship was driven ashore and wrecked on Tybee Island, Georgia, United States. |
| Champion | Great Britain | The ship was lost at Saint Lucia. |
| Chance | Great Britain | The ship capsized off Montego Bay, Jamaica. Her crew were rescued. She was on a voyage from Jamaica to Georgia, United States. |
| Clyrus | Great Britain | The ship foundered in the Atlantic Ocean. Her crew were rescued. She was on a voyage from London to Nevis. |
| Diligence | Great Britain | Anglo-French War (1778–83): The ship was captured by a French privateer and taken in to Martinique, where she was burnt to avoid being recaptured by the Royal Navy. The privateer was also burnt. Diligence was on a voyage from Greenock, Renfrewshire to the West Indies. |
| Dolphin | Great Britain | The ship was lost at Saint Lucia. |
| Eagle | Great Britain | The ship was lost on the coast of North Carolina. She was on a voyage from London to North Carolina. |
| Elizabeth | Great Britain | The ship was lost near St. John's Island, British America. She was on a voyage from Liverpool to Lisbon, Portugal and Quebec. |
| Friends | Great Britain | African slave trade: The ship was wrecked on Trinidada. There were eight survivors. She was on a voyage from the Cape Coast to the West Indies. |
| Friendship | Great Britain | American Revolutionary War: The ship was captured by the privateers Junius Brutus and Rhodes (both United States) off Charles Town, South Carolina, United States. She was recaptured by Iris (Great Britain) but ran aground at Charles Town and was wrecked. |
| General Greene | United States | American Revolutionary War: The privateer was lost in the Delaware River in an engagement with the privateer Sukey (Great Britain). |
| General Halcimand | Great Britain | The ship was lost in the Saint Lawrence River with the loss of a crew member. |
| George | Great Britain | The transport ship foundered in the Atlantic Ocean. Her crew were rescued. she was on a voyage from New York to Georgia, British America. |
| Good Hope | France | The ship was lost near Curaçao. She was on a voyage from Le Havre to Curaçao. |
| Greenock | Great Britain | The ship foundered in the Atlantic Ocean. She was on a voyage from Jamaica to Bristol. |
| Happy Return | Great Britain | The ship was lost at Barbados. |
| Harvey | Great Britain | The ship was lost in the Saint Lawrence River. Her crew were rescued. |
| Jamaica | Great Britain | The ship was lost whilst on a voyage from Jamaica to Georgia. |
| Jane | Great Britain | The ship was lost on Sable Island, Nova Scotia, British America. Her crew were rescued. She was on a voyage from London to Halifax, Nova Scotia. |
| Judith | Great Britain | The transport ship foundered in the Atlantic Ocean. Her crew were rescued. She was on a voyage from New York to Georgia. |
| Kitty | Great Britain | The ship was lost whilst on a voyage from New York to Newfoundland, British America. |
| Live Oak | Great Britain | The ship was wrecked at the Black River, Belize. Her crew were rescued. |
| Lizard | Great Britain | The ship was lost at Quebec. |
| London | Great Britain | The ship was lost in the Saint Lawrence River. Her crew were rescued. |
| Margaretta Christina | Flag unknown | The ship was lost whilst on a voyage from Halifax to Newfoundland. Her crew were rescued. |
| "Marquis Lafayette" | United States | American Revolutionary War: Leslie Expedition: The unfinished Privateer was sunk at Suffolk, Virginia to prevent capture in October or November. Later raised, finished in 1781, and put into service. |
| Mary & Isabella | Great Britain | The ship was lost at Barbados. |
| Nancy | United States | American Revolutionary War: While operating as a privateer, the brig was scuttled — apparently to avoid capture by the British — in 10 to 40 feet (3.0 to 12.2 m) of water off Cape Elizabeth, Massachusetts (now Maine), approximately 50 yards (46 m) north of the future site of the Portland Head Light. |
| Orange | Great Britain | The ship was wrecked on Grand Cayman. She was on a voyage from the Musquito Shore to London. |
| Pallas | Great Britain | The ship was lost in Morant Bay, Jamaica. |
| Patience | United States | American Revolutionary War: The ship was captured by Earl of Dunsmore (Great Britain. She was recaptured, but was subsequently lost on Long Island, Rhode Island. |
| Peggy | Great Britain | The ship (a.k.a. Wolf) was lost at St. Peter's, Nova Scotia. |
| Perseverance | Great Britain | Anglo-French War (1778–83): The ship was sunk by Bellone (French Navy). She was on a voyage from Cork to the West Indies. |
| Phœnix | (Kingdom of Great Britain) British America | The ship was driven ashore and severely damaged in the Saint Lawrence River at Maltby, Quebec. She was on a voyage from Newfoundland to Quebec. |
| Russia Merchant | Great Britain | The transport ship foundered in the Atlantic Ocean. Her crew were rescued. She was on a voyage from New York to Georgia. |
| Sharp | Great Britain | The ship was lost at Quebec. |
| St. Lawrence | (Kingdom of Great Britain) British North America | The ship was wrecked at the mouth of the Margaree River, Cape Breton Island, Nova Scotia with some loss of life. |
| Swan | Great Britain | The transport ship foundered in the Atlantic Ocean. Her crew were rescued. She was on a voyage from New York to Georgia. |
| Three Brothers | Great Britain | The ship was captured and sunk by six American vessels operating under letters of marque. She was on a voyage from New York to Jamaica. |
| Twee Gesusters | Dutch Republic | The ship was lost in the West Indies. Her crew were rescued. She was on a voyage from Amsterdam to Curaçao. |
| Venus | Great Britain | The transport ship foundered in the Atlantic Ocean. Her crew were rescued. she was on a voyage from New York to London. |
| Watt | Great Britain | The ship was wrecked on Long Island, Rhode Island, United States with the loss of 26 of her crew. She was on a voyage from New York to Jamaica. |
| William | Great Britain | The ship foundered in the Atlantic Ocean. She was on a voyage from St. Augustine, Florida, British America to London. |
| William & Elizabeth | Great Britain | The transport ship foundered in the Atlantic Ocean. Her crew were rescued by Earl of Dunmore (Great Britain). |
| William and Polly | Great Britain | The ship foundered in the Atlantic Ocean with the loss of seven of her fourteen crew. She was on a voyage from Vigo, Spain to Boston, Massachusetts, United States. |
