= Novokhopyorsky =

Novokhopyorsky/Novokhopersky (masculine), Novokhopyorskaya/Novokhoperskaya (feminine), or Novokhopyorskoye/Novokhoperskoye (neuter) may refer to:

- Novokhopyorsky District, a district of Voronezh Oblast, Russia
- Novokhopyorsky (urban locality), an urban locality (a work settlement) in Voronezh Oblast, Russia
