= Ponsborne (ship) =

Two ships named Ponsborne served as East Indiamen for the British East India Company (EIC):

- Ponsborne (1764 EIC ship) made four voyages for the EIC before her owners sold her in 1775 to Portuguese owners then sailed her between Lisbon and Goa.
- Ponsborne (1779 EIC ship) made six voyages for the EIC before she was wrecked in 1796 after having landed troops at Grenada.
