= Chris Atkins =

Chris Atkins may refer to:

- Chris Atkins (filmmaker) (born 1976), British journalist and filmmaker
- Christopher Atkins (born 1961), American actor
- Captain Christopher Atkins of HMS Actaeon (1775)

== See also ==
- Chris Akins (born 1976), retired American football player
- Chris Atkin (born 1993), English rugby league player
