= HMS Decade =

Frigate of the Royal Navy

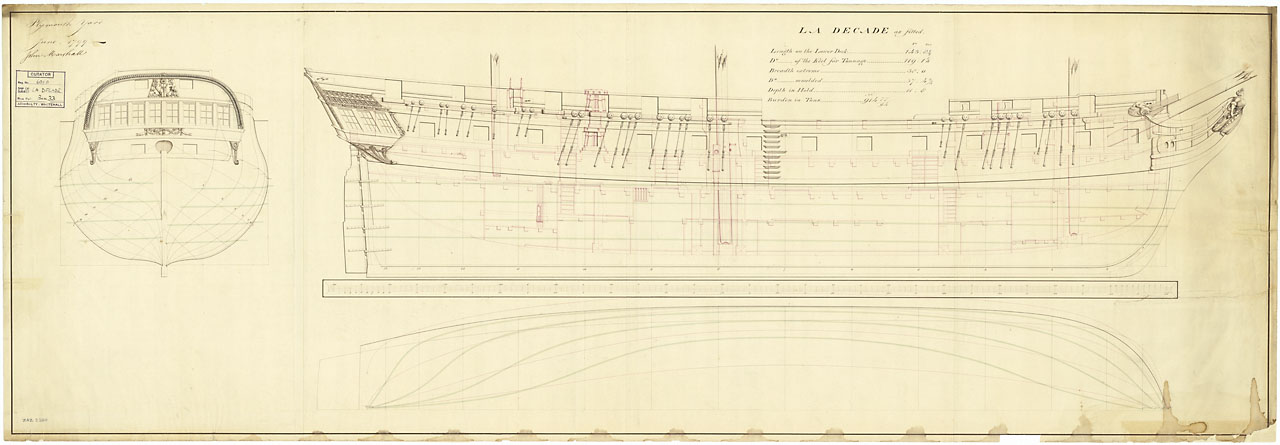
- Decade

History

France
- Name: Décade
- Builder: Pierre Guibert, Bordeaux
- Laid down: March 1794
- Launched: 10 October 1794
- Completed: January 1795
- Renamed: Had been previously named Macreuse, and Décade française
- Captured: 24 August 1798, by the Royal Navy

Great Britain
- Name: HMS Decade
- Acquired: 24 August 1798
- Fate: Sold on 21 February 1811

General characteristics
- Class & type: Galathée-class frigate
- Displacement: 1,150 tonneaux
- Tons burthen: 600 port tonneaux; 914 77/94 (bm)
- Length: 143 ft 8 1/2 in (43.8 m) (overall); 119 ft 1 1/4 in (36.3 m) (keel)
- Beam: 38 ft (11.6 m)
- Depth of hold: 11 ft 8 in (3.56 m)
- Sail plan: Full-rigged ship
- Complement: French service: 209 (peace) & 282 (war); British service:255
- Armament: French service; Upper deck (UD): 26 × 12-pounder guns; Spar deck:12 × 6-pounder guns; British service; UD: 26 × 12-pounder guns; QD: 2 × 6-pounder guns + 10 × 24-pounder carronades; Fc: 4 × 6-pounder guns + 2 × 24-pounder carronades

HMS Decade was a 36-gun fifth-rate frigate of the Royal Navy. She was formerly the French 'Galathée-class frigate Décade, which the British had captured in 1798. She served with the British during the French Revolutionary and Napoleonic Wars, and was sold out of the service in 1811.

== French service and capture ==
Décade was built at Bordeaux between March 1794 and January 1795, having been launched on 10 October 1794. She had been previously named Macreuse. After a short career with the French Navy she was captured on 24 August 1798.

On 24 August, Naiad was chasing a French frigate, which Magnanime joined. After about three hours the two British ships had caught up with the French ship, which proceeded for the next hour to fire on them with her stern chasers. She then struck. The French ship was Décade, with a crew of 336 men under the command of Citoyen Villeneau. Décade was pierced for 44 guns, but she had landed ten in Cayenne, from where she had sailed. In all, Naiad had chased Décade for 36 hours. The British took Décade back to Plymouth. She was registered there in October and fitted out there between April and December 1799.

== British service ==
She was commissioned in June 1799 under Captain James Wallis, and sent to Jamaica in January the following year. She was paid off in October 1802. Decade was fitted out at Portsmouth between May and July 1803 and recommissioned again in June 1803 under Captain William Rutherfurd. Rutherfurd commanded Decade in the English Channel, before sailing to join the Mediterranean Fleet in March 1805. She took part in the pursuit of the French fleet to the West Indies during the Trafalgar Campaign, and in 1806 she came under the command of Captain John Stuart. Stuart was assigned to Sir Richard Strachan's squadron, and took part in the pursuit of Jean-Baptiste Willaumez's squadron during the Atlantic campaign of 1806. Decade was assigned to the serve in the Channel in 1807, and by 1808 was on the Irish station.

== Fate ==
She was sold at Deptford on 21 February 1811.
