= Antoine-Stanislas de Curières de Castelnau Saint-Cosme Sainte-Eulalie =

French Navy officer of the War of American Independence

Antoine-Stanislas de Curières de Castelnau Saint-Cosme Sainte-Eulalie (Saint-Cosme, Aveyron, 1740 — Lyon, September 1783) was a French Navy officer. He served in the War of American Independence, and became a member of the Society of the Cincinnati.

== Biography ==
Sainte-Eulalie joined the Navy as a Garde-Marine in 1755. He took part in the Battle of Minorca on 20 May 1756.

He took part in the Larache expedition in 1765 under Du Chaffault, where he was gravely wounded and earned a promotion to Lieutenant for his conduct.

In 1777, he captained the 18-gun corvette Flèche. The year after, he transferred to the 26-gun frigate Aimable, part of the squadron under Vice-amiral d'Estaing. He took part in the Battle of Rhode Island on 29 August 1778, in the Battle of St. Lucia on 15 December 1778, and in the Battle of Grenada on 6 July 1779, where he was wounded.

Sainte-Eulalie was then given command of the 32-gun frigate Railleuse, on which he took part in the Battle of the Chesapeake on 5 September 1781, and in the subsequent Siege of Yorktown.

In 1782, he was given command of the 64-gun Vaillant, which he sailed to France. He then captained the 74-gun Magnanime and Téméraire.

He died in September 1783.

== Sources and references ==
Notes

Citations

References

- Contenson, Ludovic (1934). La Société des Cincinnati de France et la guerre d'Amérique (1778-1783). Paris: éditions Auguste Picard. OCLC 7842336.
- Lacour-Gayet, Georges (1910). La marine militaire de la France sous le règne de Louis XVI. Paris: Honoré Champion. pp. 431–434.
