= Joseph de Cambis =

Joseph, viscomte de Cambis (French pronunciation: [ʒozɛf də kɑ̃bi]; 20 September 1748 in Entrevaux – 25 October 1825) was a French Navy officer and Rear-Admiral.

== Career ==
Cambis was born to a noble family in Provence; his father was the governor of the small town of Entrevaux. He joined the Navy as a garde marine in Toulon, and rose steadily in rank. In 1776, he served on the Pléyade. He took part in the War of American Independence in the squadron of Count d'Estaing.

In the summer of 1791, with the rank of Major de vaisseau, he captained the frigate Galathée, ferrying civilian commissaries to Santo Domingo. In the summer of 1792, with the rank of captain, he relieved Vice-Admiral de Girardin as chief of the Leeward Antilles station. During the experiditon to Saint-Domingue in 1792, Cambis captained the Astrée, on which he escorted a convoy ferrying ammunitions and troops from Rochefort to Haiti. Later that year, he transferred from Galathée to take command of the 74-gun Jupiter at the station of Santo Domingo, where he had to repress a mutiny of his crew.

In early 1793, with the rank of rear-admiral, he captained the 74-gun Éole, and he relieved Vice-Admiral Morard de Galles as chief of the Leeward Antilles station.

He faced another mutiny in New York, where he was wounded. Cambis was hated by the colonists of Haiti and by his own crew for upholding the abolition of slavery and trying to protect free men of colour.

He returned to France in September 1793 on the frigate Surveillante, commanded by Captain Tréhouart-Beaulieu. Upon arrival, he was arrested for his political opinions and kept prisoner until the Thermidorian Reaction. He was kept unemployed during the French Directory, but returned as an inspector after the 18 Brumaire. His attempts at organising the Navy were thwarted by the policies of the consulate.

== Honours ==
- Knight of the Order of Saint Louis
- Knight of the Order of Saint Lazarus
- Society of the Cincinnati

== Notes and references ==
=== Bibliography ===
- Arnault, Antoine-Vincent (1827). Biographie nouvelle des contemporains [1787-1820] (in French). Vol. 4.
- Fonds Marine. Campagnes (opérations; divisions et stations navales; missions diverses). Inventaire de la sous-série Marine BB4. Tome premier : BB4 1 à 482 (1790-1826)
