= French frigate Républicaine française =

Galathée class frigate built in 1796

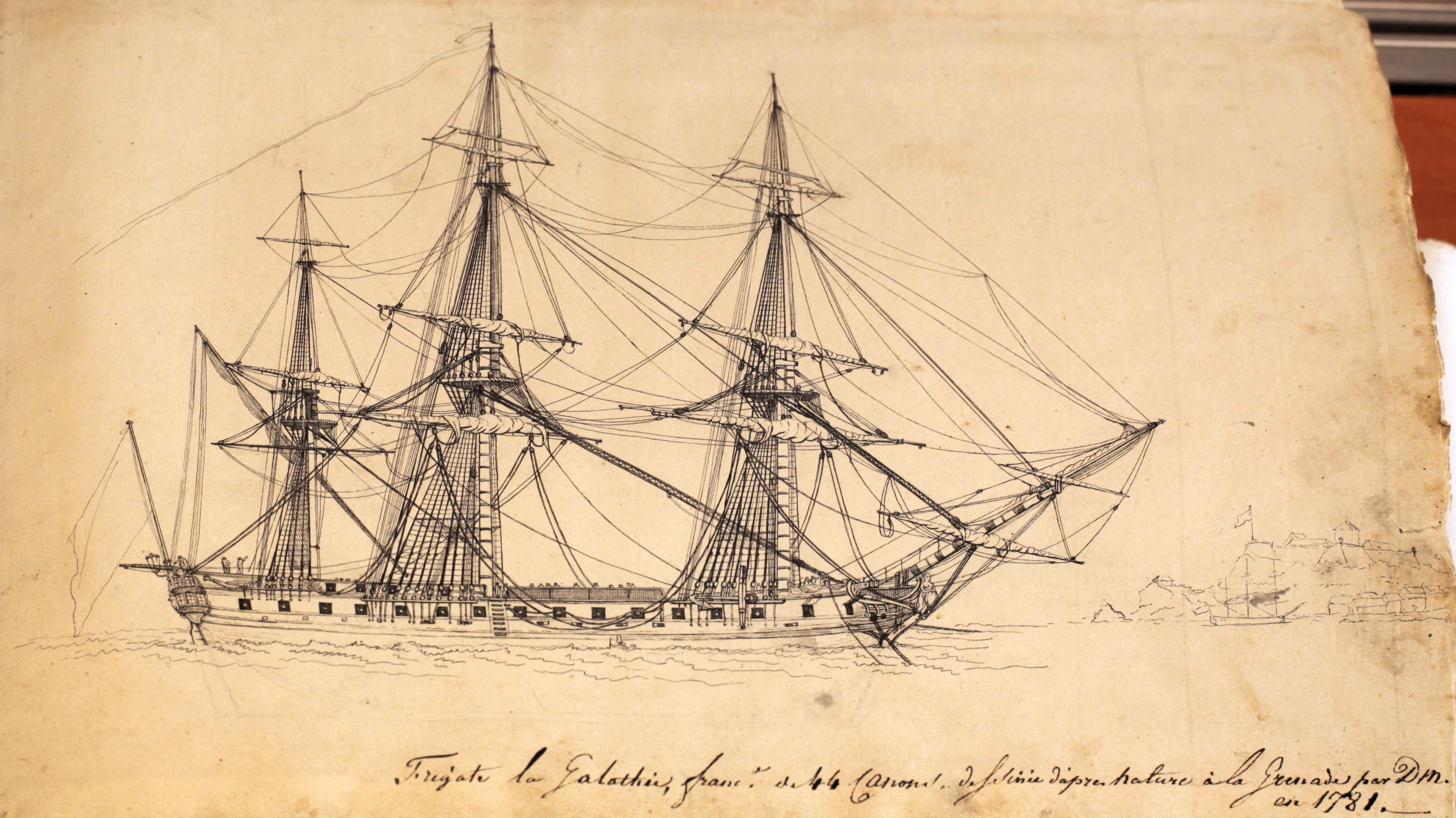
- Galathée, sister-ship of Républicaine française

History

France
- Name: Républicaine française
- Namesake: French Republic
- Builder: Bordeaux
- Laid down: July 1793
- Launched: 3 January 1794
- Commissioned: March 1794
- Captured: 1796

United Kingdom
- Name: HMS Renommee
- Acquired: 12 July 1796 by capture
- Honours and awards: Naval General Service Medal with clasp "Egypt"
- Fate: Broken up, September 1810

General characteristics
- Class & type: Galathée-class frigate
- Displacement: 1,150 tonneaux
- Tons burthen: 600 port tonneaux; 923 2/94 (bm)
- Length: 44.5 m (146 ft); 140 ft 6 1/2 in (42.8 m) (overall); 119 ft 4 5/8 in (36.4 m) (keel)
- Beam: 12.2 m (40 ft); 38 ft 1 1/2 in (11.6 m)
- Depth of hold: 5.5 m (18 ft); 11 ft 7 1/2 in (3.5 m)
- Propulsion: Sails
- Sail plan: Full-rigged ship
- Complement: French service:320; British service:264
- Armament: French service: 32 guns, later upgraded to 44; British service: Upper deck:26 × 12-pounder guns; QD: 12 × 32-pounder carronades; Fc: 2 × 9-pounder guns + 2 × 32-pounder carronades

Républicaine française was a 32-gun frigate of the French Navy, of the Galathée class. The Royal Navy captured her in 1796. The Navy fitted her as a troopship in 1800, but both as a troopship, and earlier as a frigate, she captured several small Spanish and French privateers. She was broken up in 1810.

== French service ==
Ordered in March 1793 as Panthère, she became République française in January 1794, and eventually Républicaine française when commissioned in May, as the name had been attributed to the 120-gun République française (1802).

Under Lieutenant François Pitot, she cruised the Atlantic off Brest. On 30 May 1795, she was again renamed to Renommée.

=== Action of 13 June 1796 ===
In July 1796, Renommée patrolled the Caribbean off Porto Rico. On 12 July, she chased a strange ship, which she joined around 18:00. The ship hoisted two flags half-mast and fired a shot, to which Renommée responded by flying her colours. Immediately, the ship hoisted the Union Jack and gave chase.

Captain Pitot attempted to escape by throwing his anchors and some of his guns overboard, but the ship gained on Renommée. On 13 July, at around 4a.m., the British ship, identified as the 74-gun HMS Alfred under captain Drury, fired a broadside that struck Renommée under the waterline, causing a leak that wet her ammunition. After a second broadside from Alfred, Pitot struck his colours.

Led aboard Alfred, Pitot learned that several ships had been lured into the trap that had caught him. Pitot was later acquitted by the court-martial for the loss of his ship.

== British service ==
On her capture Commander John Richards (acting) took command of Renommee. The Royal Navy commissioned her at Jamaica as HMS Renommee, under the command of Captain Robert Rolles.

On 6 September 1797 she was in company with HMS Diligence and HMS Hermione when Diligence captured a Spanish 6-gun packet ship with troops on board.

On 20 September 1798, Renommee captured the 6-gun privateer Triomphante. Then in February 1799, Renommee captured the Spanish 4-gun privateer Neptune.

Early in 1799 Renommee captured a merchant vessel.

Renommee arrived at Portsmouth on 2 August 1799. Captain William Sanderson took command in August, and paid her off that month.

Between January and March 1800, Renommee underwent fitting at Portsmouth for service as a troopship. In February Commander James Nasmyth Marshall recommissioned her. Commander Peter M'Keller later replaced Marshall.

Renommee served in the navy's Egyptian campaign between 8 March 1801 and 2 September, so her officers and crew qualified for the clasp "Egypt" to the Naval General Service Medal, which the Admiralty authorised in 1850 to all surviving claimants. (Note: A first-class share of the prize money awarded in April 1823 was worth £34 2s 4d; a fifth-class share, that of a seaman, was worth 3s 11½d. The amount was small as the total had to be shared between 79 vessels and the entire army contingent.) After the Egyptian operations Renommee was paid off.

Between September 1804 and January 1805 Renommee underwent repairs by Perry & Co., Blackwall. She then underwent fitting-out at Woolwich until March for a return to service as a 38-gun frigate. Captain Sir Thomas Livingstone recommissioned her in January for the Channel. She then sailed to the Mediterranean.

Renommee shared with ten other vessels in the capture on 2 August 1805 of the vessels:

- Lucy, F. G. Voizard, Master,
- Desiree, J. V, Coltais,
- Paix, B. Potel,
- Deux Amis, P. Endelinne, and
- Gun Pinnace, No. 311, A. Hice.

On 4 April 1806 Renommee came upon a Spanish brig anchored under Fort Callcretes on the Cape de Gatte. Renommee was able to capture the brig despite coming under fire from the brig, shore batteries, and two gun boats. The captured brig was the Vigilante, armed with twelve 12-poounder long guns and six short 24-pounder guns. She had a crew of 109 men under the command of Teniento de Navio Don Joseph Julian. British casualties amounted to two men wounded; Spanish casualties were one man killed and three men wounded. Vigilante's main mast went overboard shortly after the engagement ended, and her foremast almost did. Renommee therefore took her under tow and brought her into port. The Royal Navy took Vigilante into service as HMS Spider.

In the early morning of 4 May, the boats of Renommee and Nautilus, under the command of Lieutenant Sir William Parker, of Renommee, brought out from under the fire of the guns of the town and tower of Vieja and also from under the fire of more than 100 musketeers, the Spanish naval schooner Giganta. Giganta was armed with two 24-pounders, three 4-pounder long guns, four 4-pounders, and swivel guns. She had a crew of 38 men under the command of Alfirre de Navis Don Juan de Moire. British casualties amounted to four men severely wounded and three lightly wounded; Spanish casualties consisted of one man mortally wounded and nine men severely wounded. There were no immediate fatalities. Livingstone recommended that the Navy take Giganta into service at Gibraltar. (Note: Lloyd's Patriotic Fund awarded Lieutenant Parker and Lieutenant Charles Adams, both of Renommee, an honour sword worth £50 each.)

On 21 and 22 October 1806, Lieutenant Sir William Parker again led Renomee's boats in cutting-out expeditions. The first occurred at Colon, on Majorca, where in the face of enemy fire the British captured one tartane of four guns, and two settees, one of which mounted three guns. The settees were carrying grain and the British were able to bring them out. The tartan ran aground so the raiding party set her on fire, which led to her blowing up. One British seaman was wounded in the action.

The next night, Parker again went into the port and from under the fire of the tower of Falconara, brought out a settee armed with two guns. Small arms fire from shore wounded one British seaman, so Parker landed with some seamen and marines. The landing party killed one Spaniard and drove the others off. There were no other British casualties.

Early in the morning of 7 November 1807, boats from Renommee and Grasshopper cut out a Spanish brig and a French tartan, each armed with six guns, from under the Torre de Estacio. The prize crews were not able to prevent winds and tides from causing the two vessels to ground. The boats and the two vessels were under a constant fire from the tower that wounded several prisoners. After about three hours the British abandoned their prizes as they could not free them and were unwilling to set fire to them as the captured vessels had prisoners and women and children aboard, many of whom were wounded. The British had two men badly wounded in the action; although the enemy suffered many wounded, they apparently had no deaths.

Renomee shared in the proceeds of Grasshopper's capture on 12 November of the American schooner Henrietta, Henry Dawson, master.

== Fate ==
Renomee was scrapped at Deptford in September 1810.

== Legacy ==
Derek Gardner created a painting of her surrender to HMS Alfred.
