= Aurora (1779 ship) =

Merchant vessel and British slave ship 1779-1807

History

Pennsylvania
- Name: Aurora
- Builder: Philadelphia
- Launched: 1779
- Fate: Sold c.1799

Great Britain
- Name: Aurora
- Acquired: c.1799
- Fate: Wrecked November 1807 and condemned

General characteristics
- Tons burthen: 284, or 286, or 299 (bm)
- Complement: 1800:28; 1803:30; 1805:40
- Armament: 1800:18 × 9-pounder guns; 1800:18 × 18&6-pounder cannons; 1803:12 × 6-pounder guns; 1805:12 × 6-pounder guns

Aurora was launched at Philadelphia in 1779. She did not appear in British registers until 1800. She then made five voyages from London as a slave ship in the triangular trade in enslaved people. She was damaged and condemned at Jamaica in 1807 after having landed the captives from her fifth voyage.

== Career ==
Aurora first appeared in Lloyd's Register (LR) in 1800 with A. Duncan, master, changing to A.Rose, changing to Lawson. Her owner was A.Hughans. Her trade was Liverpool–Jamaica, changing to London–Africa. She had been almost rebuilt in 1797.

Captain Adam Rose acquired a letter of marque on 22 April 1800.

1st voyage transporting enslaved people (1800–1801): Captain George Lawson acquired a letter of marque on 26 November 1800. He sailed from London on 2 December 1800, bound for the Gold Coast. In 1800, 133 vessels sailed from English ports bound for Africa to acquire and transport captives; ten of these vessels sailed from London.

Aurora acquired captives at Cape Coast Castle and Anomabu. She arrived at Kingston, Jamaica, on 11 August 1801 and there landed 278 captives. She left Kingston on 5 September, and arrived back at London on 1 November. At some point in the voyage Captain Thomas Ramsey had replaced Lawson.

2nd voyage transporting enslaved people (1802–1803): Captain Nathaniel McGhie sailed from London on 17 January 1802. In 1802, 155 vessels sailed from English ports bound for Africa to acquire and transport captives; 30 of these vessels sailed from London.

Aurora embarked captives on the Gold Coast. She arrived at Kingston on 17 December and landed 277 captives. She left Kingston on 7 March 1803 and arrived at London on 8 May.

3rd voyage transporting enslaved people (1803–1804): Captain James Wilkinson acquired a letter of marque on 15 October 1803. Captain James Wilkins sailed from London on 15 November. In 1802, 99 vessels sailed from English ports bound for Africa to acquire and transport captives; 15 of these vessels sailed from London.

Aurora started embarking captives on 26 February 1804, first at Cape Coast Castle, and then at Accra. She arrived at Kingston on 28 June with 290 captive. She arrived back at London on 11 October.

4th voyage transporting enslaved people (1805–1806): Captain James Phillips acquired a letter of marque on 14 March 1805. He sailed from London on 5 April. Aurora acquired captives on the Gold Coast and arrived at Demerara on 16 November. There she landed 280 captives. She arrived back at London on 1 June 1806. On 23 March she was at the Long Island Channel at Crookhaven, having had to throw her guns and some of her cargo overboard during bad weather. From Long Island she sailed to Cork and then Rostock, before arriving back at England.

Lloyd's List reported in May 1805 that the French had burned Aurora, Phillips, master, at Dominica. The entry in the 1806 volume of Lloyd's Register for the Aurora of the present article carried the annotation "burnt". However, it is not clear which vessel the Aurora that was burnt was. The Aurora, Phillips, master, of London, of this article was on the coast of Africa when the other Aurora, Phillips, master, of London, was at Dominica.

5th voyage transporting enslaved people (1806–1807): Captain John Finlay sailed from London on 14 July 1806. Lloyd's List reported in September that Aurora, Findlay, master, had put into Lisbon having lost her masts. She acquired captives at Lagos, Onim, and at Accra. She arrived at Kingston on 31 July 1807.

== Fate ==
On 26 November 1807 a gale upset Aurora, Finlay, master, while she was at Jamaica. She was condemned there.

In 1807, some 12 British Guineamen were lost, though it is not clear whether that estimate includes Aurora. During the period 1793 to 1807, war, rather than maritime hazards or resistance by the captives, was the greatest cause of vessel losses among British enslaving vessels.
