= French frigate Galathée (1779) =

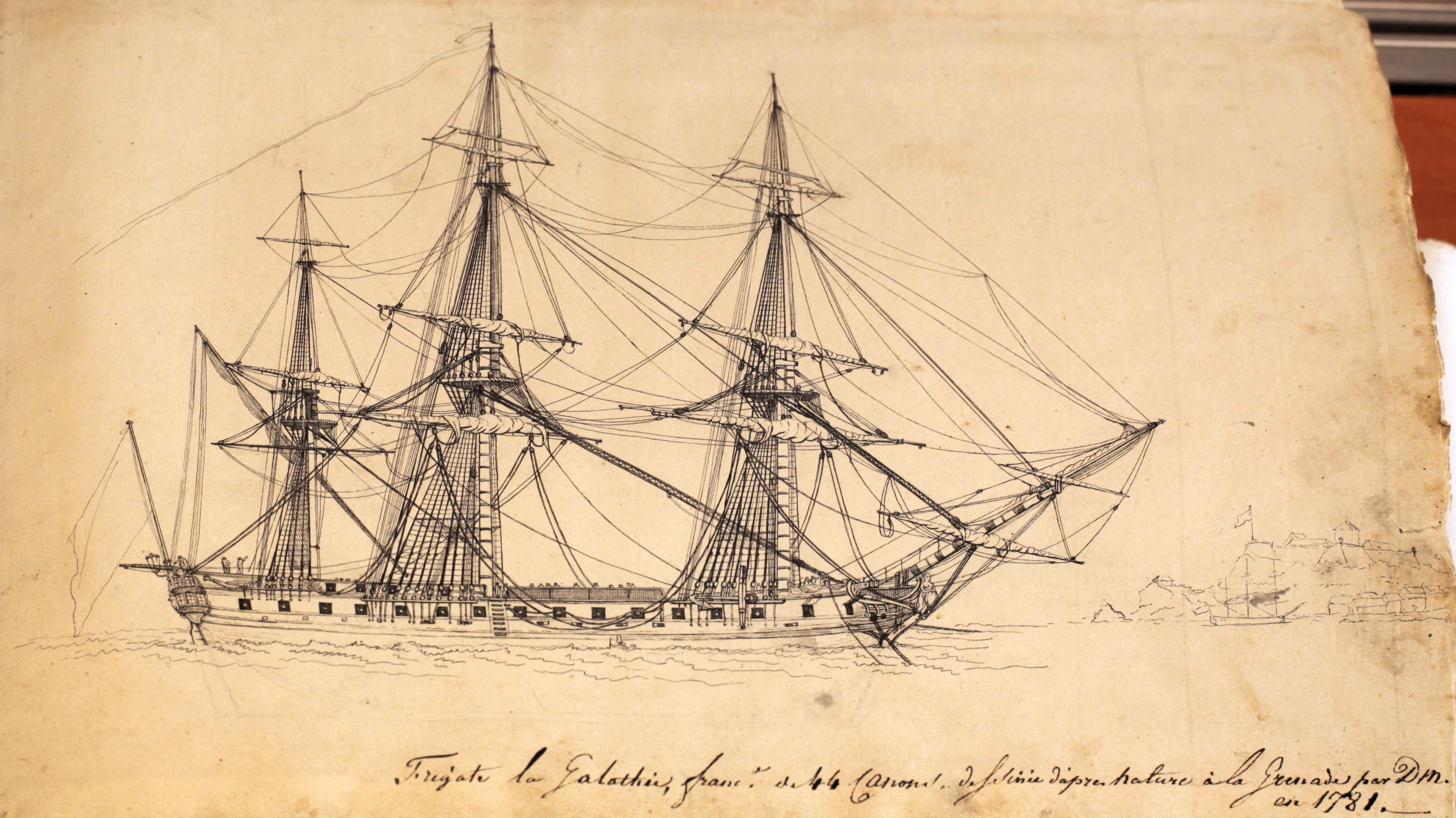
- Galathée, drawn in 1781 by François Aimé Louis Dumoulin

History

France
- Name: Galathée
- Namesake: Galatea
- Builder: Rochefort
- Laid down: January 1778
- Launched: 28 June 1779
- Fate: Ran aground 1795

General characteristics
- Class & type: Galathée-class frigate
- Displacement: 1,150 tonneaux
- Tons burthen: 600 port tonneaux
- Length: 44.5 m (146 ft 0 in)
- Beam: 12.2 m (40 ft 0 in)
- Depth of hold: 5.5 m (18 ft 1 in)
- Propulsion: Sails
- Sail plan: Full-rigged ship
- Armament: 32 guns, later upgraded to 44

Galathée (or Galatée) was a 32-gun frigate of the French Navy, lead ship of her class.

== Career ==
In February 1780, Galathée escorted convoys in the Bay of Biscay, along with Hermione.

Galathée took part in the Naval operations in the American Revolutionary War, taking part in the capture of Sint Eustatius and to the Battle of the Saintes.

In the summer of 1791, under Major de vaisseau Joseph de Cambis, she ferried French national commissioners to Saint-Domingue. In March 1792, in support of one of these commissioners, Edmond de Saint-Léger, Galathée shelled the forces of Romaine-la-Prophétesse which were attacking Léogâne.

During the French Revolution, she took part in the Combat du 13 prairial, where she took Terrible in tow, under fire, preventing her capture by the British.

On 14 July 1794 she and Seine captured the 16-gun sloop-of-war HMS Hound in the Atlantic.

In the night of 23 to 24 April 1795, Galathée ran aground off Penmarch, becoming a total loss.
