= French ship Magnanime (1779) =

Ship of the line of the French Navy

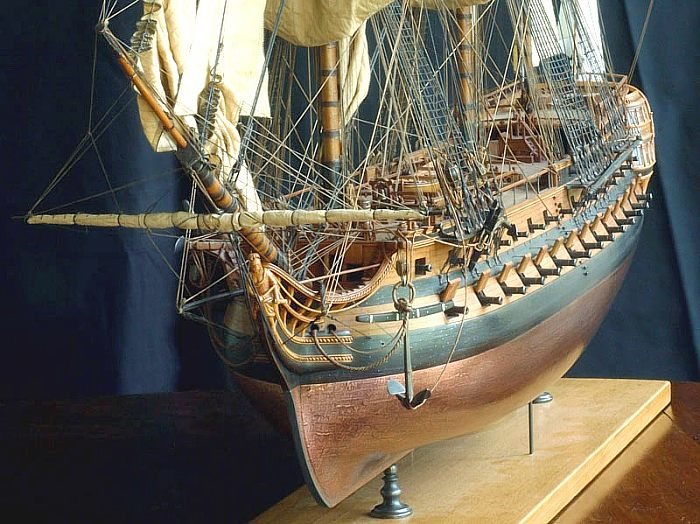
- A 74-gun French ship of the line similar to Magnanime

History

France
- Name: Magnanime
- Namesake: Magnanimous
- Builder: Rochefort
- Laid down: October 1778
- Launched: 27 August 1779
- In service: December 1779
- Out of service: 1792
- Fate: Broken up 1793

General characteristics
- Class & type: Magnanime-class ship of the line
- Displacement: 2,950 tonneaux
- Tons burthen: 1,500 port tonneaux
- Length: 55.6 m (182 ft 5 in)
- Beam: 14.3 m (46 ft 11 in)
- Draught: 6.8 m (22 ft 4 in)
- Propulsion: Sail
- Armament: 74 guns: 28 × 36-pounder long guns; 30 × 18-pounder long guns; 16 × 8-pounder long guns

Magnanime was a 74-gun ship of the line of the French Navy who was the lead ship of her class.

== Career ==
She took part in the American Revolutionary War in De Grasse's squadron, under Captain Jean Antoine Le Bègue de Germiny, most notably in the Battle of the Chesapeake, the Battle of St. Lucia, and the Battle of the Saintes.

In 1782 or 1783, she was under Antoine-Stanislas de Curières de Castelnau Saint-Cosme Sainte-Eulalie.

== Fate ==
Magnanime was broken up in Brest in 1793.
