= HMS Actaeon (1775) =

Enterprise-class Royal Navy frigate

History

Great Britain
- Name: HMS Actaeon
- Ordered: 5 November 1771
- Builder: Woolwich Dockyard
- Laid down: October 1772
- Launched: 18 April 1775
- Completed: August 1775
- Commissioned: 19 June 1775
- Fate: Lost in action off Fort Sullivan, South Carolina, 29 June 1776

General characteristics
- Class & type: 28-gun Enterprise-class sixth-rate frigate
- Tons burthen: 593 89/94 (bm)
- Length: 120 ft 6.5 in (36.741 m) (overall); 99 ft 6 in (30.33 m) (keel)
- Beam: 33 ft 6 in (10.2 m)
- Depth of hold: 11 ft 0.25 in (3.3592 m)
- Sail plan: Full-rigged ship
- Complement: 200 officers and men
- Armament: 28 guns comprising; Upper deck: 24 × 9-pounder guns; Quarterdeck: 4 × 6-pounder guns; Forecastle: nil; 12 × swivel guns

HMS Actaeon was a 28-gun Enterprise-class sixth-rate frigate of the Royal Navy.

== History ==
The Actaeon was first commissioned in June 1775 under the command of Captain Christopher Atkins, as part of a class of 27 vessels that were designed in 1770 by John Williams.

In August 1775, she was driven ashore at Lymington, Hampshire. She was refloated on 31 August and taken in to Portsmouth, Hampshire for repairs.
