= Magnanime-class ship of the line =

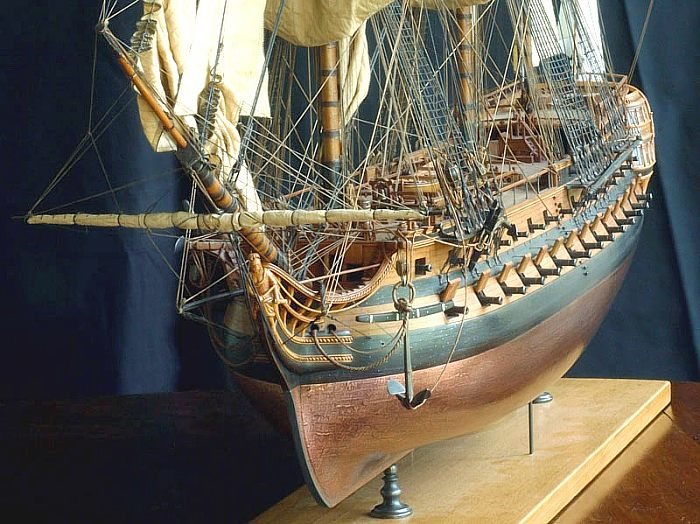
- A 74-gun French ship of the line similar to the Magnanime-class ships of the line

Class overview
- Name: Magnanime
- Builders: Toulon
- Operators: French Navy
- Completed: 2

General characteristics
- Type: Ship of the line
- Displacement: 2,950 tonneaux
- Tons burthen: 1,500 port tonneaux
- Length: 55.6 m (182 ft 5 in)
- Beam: 14.3 m (46 ft 11 in)
- Draught: 6.8 m (22 ft 4 in)
- Propulsion: Sail
- Armament: 74 guns: 28 36-pounder long guns; 30 18-pounder long guns; 16 8-pounder long guns
- Armour: Timber

The Magnanime class was a class of two 74-gun ships of the line built for France in the late 1770s. They were designed by Jean-Denis Chevillard, and both were constructed at Rochefort Dockyard.

- Magnanime

Builder: Rochefort Dockyard
Ordered: 1778
Begun: October 1778
Launched: 27 August 1779
Completed: December 1779
Fate: Decommissioned in 1792 at Brest, broken up in 1793

- Illustre

Builder: Rochefort Dockyard
Ordered: 1778 or 1779
Begun: August 1779
Launched: 23 February 1781
Completed: March 1781
Fate: Renamed Mucius Scévola in January 1791, shortened to Scévola in February 1791, and cut down (raséed) to a 50-gun "heavy" frigate between August 1793 and February 1794. Wrecked in a storm on 16 December 1796 during the attempted invasion of Ireland.
