= USS Active (1779) =

Brigantine of the Continental Navy

History

United States
- Name: Active
- Builder: Marshfield, Massachusetts
- Launched: July 1779
- Captured: 23 March 1782
- Fate: Condemned as a prize and sold

General characteristics
- Class & type: Packet
- Tons burthen: 60
- Propulsion: Sail
- Sail plan: Brigantine
- Complement: 15

USS Active was a brigantine of the Continental Navy. She was built at Marshfield, Massachusetts on the orders of the Continental Congress and launched in July 1779. Under the command of Captain Corbin Barnes, Active made voyages to Bilbao, Spain, in 1780 and to Nantes, France, in 1781. On 23 March 1782, while sailing from Philadelphia to Havana, Cuba, she encountered the British man-of-war HMS Proserpine and was captured. The British warship took her into Jamaica where she was condemned as a prize and sold.

== Notes ==
Citations

== Bibliography ==
Online sources

- "Active I (Brigantine)". Dictionary of American Naval Fighting Ships. Naval History and Heritage Command. 19 January 2016. This article incorporates text from this source, which is in the public domain.
