= HMS Andromeda (1777) =

Enterprise-class Royal Navy frigate

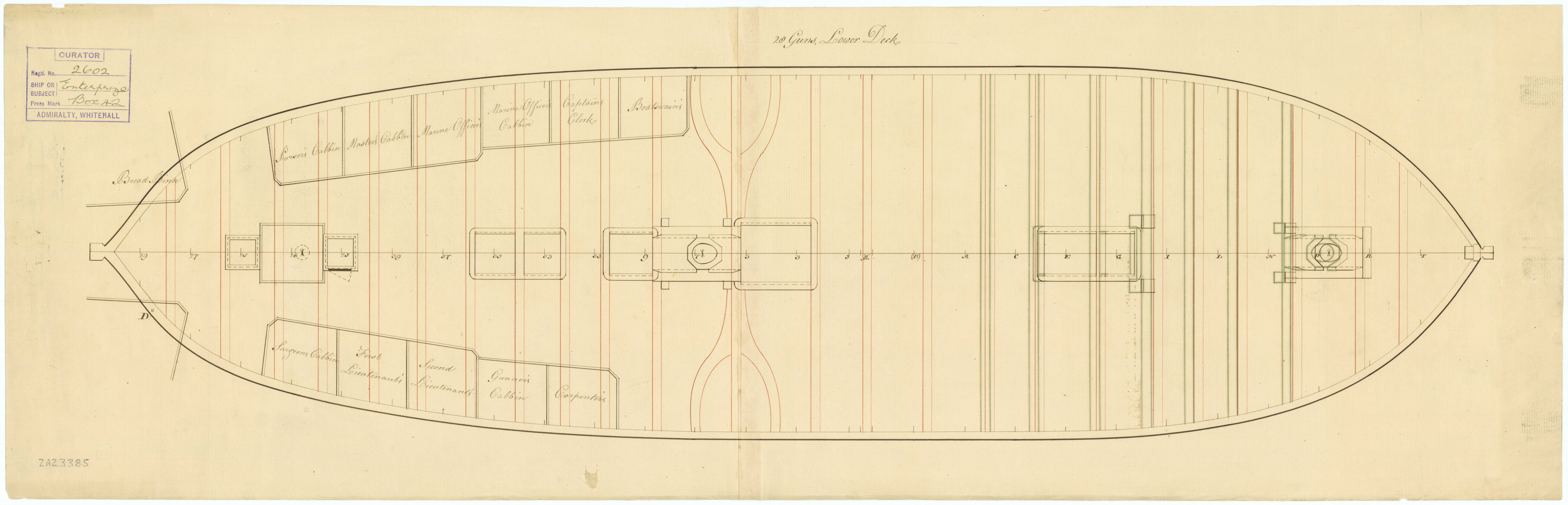
- Lower deck plan of Andromeda

History

Great Britain
- Name: Andromeda
- Ordered: 14 May 1776
- Builder: Robert Fabian, East Cowes
- Laid down: July 1776
- Launched: 18 November 1777
- Completed: 28 January 1778 (at Portsmouth Dockyard)
- Commissioned: September 1777
- Fate: Capsized and lost with all hands in hurricane off Martinique 11 October 1780

General characteristics
- Class & type: 28-gun Enterprise-class sixth-rate frigate
- Tons burthen: 600 66/94 (bm)
- Length: 120 ft 9 in (36.80 m) (overall); 99 ft 7.625 in (30.36888 m) (keel)
- Beam: 33 ft 8 in (10.3 m)
- Depth of hold: 11 ft 0 in (3.35 m)
- Sail plan: Full-rigged ship
- Complement: 200 officers and men
- Armament: 28 guns comprising; Upper deck: 24 × 9-pounder guns; Quarterdeck: 4 × 6-pounder guns + 4 × 18-pounder carronades; Forecastle: 2 × 18-pounder carronades; 12 × swivel guns

HMS Andromeda was a 28-gun Enterprise-class sixth-rate frigate of the Royal Navy. Andromeda was first Royal Navy ship commissioned by that name, in September 1777 under the command of Captain Henry Bryne. On 30 May 1778 she captured and burned American privateer brig Angelica at sea while transporting General Sir William Howe back to England. It sank off Martinique in the Great Hurricane of 1780 on 11 October 1780, killing all of the crew.
