= Galathée-class frigate =

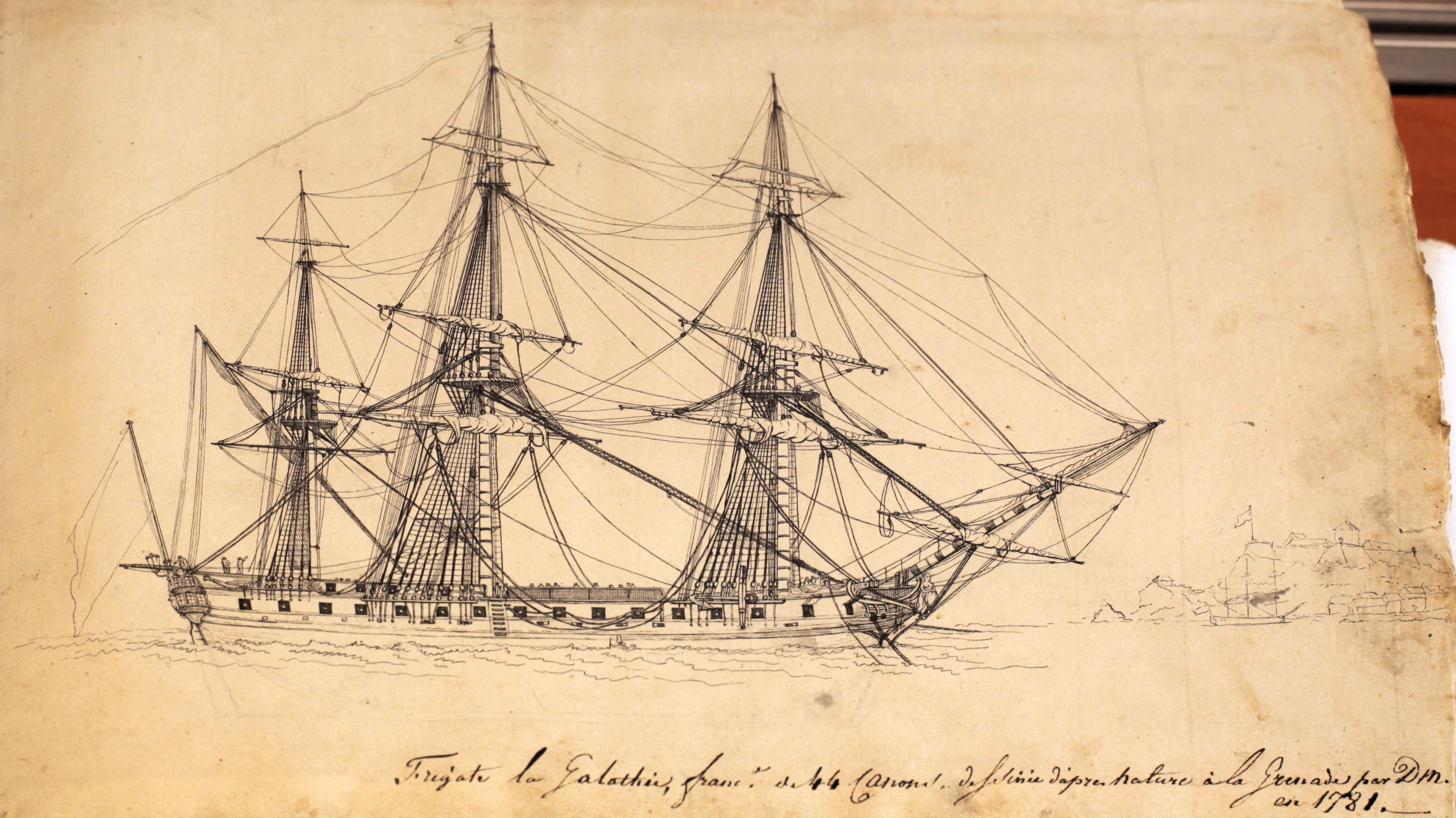
- Galathée, drawn in 1781 by François Aimé Louis Dumoulin

Class overview
- Name: Galathée
- Builders: Rochefort and Bordeaux
- Operators: French Navy; Royal Navy
- Completed: 6

General characteristics
- Class & type: Galathée class frigate, 44 guns
- Displacement: 1,150 tonneaux
- Tons burthen: 600 port tonneaux
- Length: 44.5 m (146 ft)
- Beam: 12.2 m (40 ft)
- Depth of hold: 5.5 m (18 ft)
- Propulsion: Sails
- Sail plan: Full-rigged ship
- Armament: 32 guns, later upgraded to 44

The Galathée class was a type of 32-gun frigates of the French Navy, designed by Raymond-Antoine Haran, with 26 × 12-pounder and 6 × 6-pounder guns. six units were built in all, seeing service during the Naval operations in the American Revolutionary War, and later in the French Revolutionary Wars. The Royal Navy captured and took into service five of the six, the sixth being wrecked early in the French Revolutionary Wars.

- Galathée

Builder: Rochefort
Ordered:
Launched: 1779
Fate: wrecked in 1795

- Railleuse

Builder: Bordeaux
Ordered:
Launched: 1779
Fate: sold as a privateer and captured in 1804 by the Royal Navy. Taken into British service as HMS Antigua.

- Fleur de Lys

Builder: Rochefort
Ordered:
Launched: 1785
Fate: renamed to Pique, captured by the Royal Navy and taken into British service as HMS Pique in 1796

- Charente Inférieure

Builder: Rochefort
Ordered:
Launched: 1793
Fate: renamed Tribune in February 1794, captured by British Navy in 1796 and taken into British service as HMS Tribune, being wrecked the next year

- Républicaine française

Builder: Bordeaux
Ordered:
Launched: 1794
Fate: renamed Renommée in 1795; captured by British Navy in 1796, becoming HMS Renommee. Broken up 1810

- Décade Française

Builder: Pierre Guibert, Bordeaux
Ordered:
Launched: 1794
Fate: Renamed Décade in 1795; captured by British navy in 1798, becoming HMS Decade. Sold 1811
