= HMS Antigua (1804) =

Galathee class frigate

History

France
- Name: Railleuse
- Builder: Rochefort
- Launched: 11 August 1779
- Captured: 25 March 1804
- Notes: Originally the Galathée-class frigate Railleuse and then the 36-gun privateer Égyptienne

United Kingdom
- Name: HMS Antigua
- Namesake: Antigua, an island in the West Indies
- Acquired: By capture 25 March 1804 or 27 March 1804
- Fate: Scrapped 1816

General characteristics
- Class & type: Galathée-class frigate
- Displacement: 1,150 tonneaux
- Tons burthen: 600 port tonneaux; 856 tons bm
- Length: 145 ft (44.2 m) (overall); c.117 ft 6 in (35.8 m)
- Beam: 37 ft (11.3 m)
- Complement: 301 (French service)
- Armament: French service; Initially: 26 × 12-pounder + 6 × 6-pounder guns; Later: 8 × 6-pounder guns + 4 × 36-pounder howitzers

HMS Antigua was a French frigate launched in 1779. She became a privateer that the British captured in 1804. She served the Royal Navy as a prison ship from 1804 to 1816, when she was broken up.

== French service ==
Antigua began her career as the Galathée class French frigate Railleuse. She was built in Bordeaux in 1777 to a 32-gun design by Raymond-Antoine Haran and launched in 1779.

She took part in the Battle of the Chesapeake on 5 September 1781, and in the subsequent Siege of Yorktown, under Sainte-Eulalie.

She underwent repairs at Rochefort several times, in January to April 1783 and in May 1790. In 1791 she was coppered, and then underwent further repairs in 1794.

On 11 June 1794 she was cruising in the Channel when she encountered and chased the 14-gun cutter HMS Ranger off Brest. Ranger engaged in some proforma resistance and then struck. The French treated Ranger's crew badly, stripping the men naked and keeping them on deck for two days until they arrived at Brest. The French Navy took Ranger into service and kept her name.

== Privateer ==
In 1797 the French navy disposed of Railleuse. She became the French privateer Égyptienne, a 36-gun ship with a crew of 120 based at Bordeaux.

In December 1800, the hired armed cutter Nimrod recaptured Skene, Crawly, master, which had been sailing from Dublin to London when the privateer Egyptian captured Skene. Nimrod sent Skene into Falmouth on 30 December.

A letter from Madeira dated 22 February 1804 reported that the 36-gun privateer Égyptienne was cruising to the south of the island. Another privateer, this one of 20 guns, was also in the area. Egyptienne was next reported to be off the windward coast of Africa on 8 March.

Égyptienne must have then sailed to the Caribbean as on 19 March she captured the Denault, Ball, master, which had been sailing from London to Demerara, and sent her into Guadeloupe. Égyptienne then intercepted the Ranger, Williams, master, Favourite, Holman, master, and Wadstray, Way, master, which were sailing in company, also from London to Demerara. Égyptienne captured the Wadstray, which however the frigate Blanche recaptured, and sent into Jamaica.

== Capture ==
On 23 March 1804, the British 18-gun sloop Osprey gave chase to four ships that turned out to be a frigate and three merchant ships. Osprey badly damaged the frigate Égyptienne in a close, 80-minute action near Barbados before Égyptienne used her superior speed to escape. Osprey lost one man killed and 16 wounded in the action and her hull and rigging were badly damaged.

On the 25th, Osprey and the British 18-gun sloop Hippomenes recaptured the Reliance, one of several prizes that Égyptienne had taken. From the prize master the British found out the identity of the vessel that Osprey had fought.

On 25 March 1804 or 27 March 1804 Hippomenes captured the damaged Égyptienne after a 54-hour chase followed by a three-hour, 20-minute single-ship action. Égyptienne was under the command of M. Placiard and had a crew of 255 men. After Hippomenses captured Égyptienne, the British found out that she had lost eight men killed and 19 wounded in the fight with Osprey. Hippomenes had only one man slightly wounded.

== British service and fate ==
The British took Égyptienne into service as HMS Antigua as there was already an Egyptienne in the Royal Navy. Because Égyptienne was twenty-five years old, and battered, the Navy decided against sending her to sea again. Lieutenant James Middleton commissioned her in December 1808 and commanded her until 1815. From December 1808 Antigua served as a prison hulk until scrapped in 1816.
