= Ponsborne (1779 EIC ship) =

History

Great Britain
- Name: Ponsborne
- Owner: Thomas Lane
- Operator: East India Company
- Builder: Barnard, Deptford
- Launched: 23 November 1779
- Fate: Wrecked in 1796
- Notes: Three decks

General characteristics
- Tons burthen: 804, or 80485/94, (bm)
- Length: Overall: 143 ft 4 in (43.7 m); Keel:115 ft 8 1/4 in (35.3 m)
- Beam: 36 ft 2 in (11.0 m)
- Depth of hold: 15 ft 3 in (4.6 m)
- Propulsion: Sail
- Complement: 1794:100; 1795:80
- Armament: 1794:26 × 18&6-pounder guns; 1795:26 × 12&6-pounder guns

Ponsborne was launched in 1779 as an East Indiaman for the British East India Company (EIC). She made six voyages for the EIC before she was wrecked in 1796 at Grenada after having landed troops there.

== EIC voyages ==
=== EIC voyage #1 (1780-1782) ===
Captain Frederick LeMesurier sailed from Torbay on 3 April 1780, bound for Madras, Bombay, and China. Ponsborne was at Trindade on 6 June, and reached Madras on 3 September. She visited Masulipatam on 22 September and then returned to Madras on 11 October. She was at Tellicherry on 27 November and Mahé on 4 January 1781. She was again at Tellicherry on 13 January, reached Goa on 16 March, and arrived at Bombay on 7 April. She was again at Madras on 5 August, and arrived at Whampoa Anchorage on 1 October. Homeward bound, she crossed the Second Bar on 11 January 1782, reached St Helena on 15 July, and arrived at The Downs on 24 October.

=== EIC voyage #2 (1783-1785) ===
Captain William Hammett sailed from The Downs on 24 November 1783, bound for Madras and China. Ponsborne was at the Cape of Good Hope on 18 March 1784, and reached Madras on 3 June. On 22 August she reached Malacca, and on 23 September she arrived at Whampoa. Homeward bound, she crossed the Second Bar on 13 December, and left Macao on 2 January 1785. She was at the Cape on 8 March, and reached St Helena on 24 March 1785. She left on 3 April, and arrived at Falmouth on 31 May. She finally arrived at The Downs on 3 June.

=== EIC voyage #3 (1786-1787) ===
Captain James Thomas sailed from The Downs on 2 February 1786, bound for Madras and China. Ponsborne reached Madras on 27 June and Malacca on 30 August; she arrived at Whampoa on 3 October. Homeward bound, she crossed the Second Bar on 16 February 1787, reached St Helena on 24 June, and arrived at The Downs on 19 September.

=== EIC voyage #4 (1789-1790) ===
Captain Thomas sailed from Portsmouth on 30 Apr 1789, bound for Bombay. Ponsborne reached São Tiago on 28 May, and arrived at Bombay on 31 August. She was at Tellicherry on 28 October, before returning to Bombay on 10 December. She reached St Helena on 19 March 1790, and arrived at The Downs on 23 May.

=== EIC voyage #5 (1792-1793) ===
Captain Thomas sailed from The Downs on 6 April 1792, bound for Madras and Bengal. Ponsborne reached Madras on 1 August and arrived at Diamond Harbour on 17 August. (Note: Thomas Twining, a young East India Company civil servant, published an account of this voyage many years later.) She then visited Ganjam on 3 October and Vizagapatam on 13 October, before returning to Diamond Harbour on 27 November. Homeward bound, she was at Saugor 25 December and Madras on 14 January 1793. she reached St Helena on 11 April and arrived at her mooring on 5 July.

=== EIC voyage #6 (1794-1795) ===
War with France had commenced before Ponsborne returned from her fifth voyage. As a result, Captain Thomas acquired a letter of marque on 13 February 1794 before he sailed her on her sixth voyage.

The British government held Ponsborne at Portsmouth, together with a number of other Indiamen in anticipation of using them as transports for an attack on Île de France (Mauritius). It gave up the plan and released the vessels in May 1794. It paid £812 10s for having delayed her departure by 39 days.

Ponsborne sailed from Portsmouth on 2 May 1794, bound for China. She arrived at Whampoa on 14 October. Homeward bound, she crossed the Second Bar on 27 December, reached St Helena on 13 April 1795, and arrived at the Downs on 23 July.

== West Indies expedition and loss ==
The British Government then took up a number of East Indiamen and other transports to carry troops on Admiral Hugh Cloberry Christian's expedition to the West Indies. Captain James Clifford acquired a letter of marque on 30 October 1795. Ponsborne carried hospital tents, bedding, and stores.

She sailed on 6 October and joined the fleet, which did not leave Spithead until 16 November. Bad weather forced the fleet to return to port after having sustained heavy losses. The fleet attempted to sail again on 9 December, but bad weather forced most of the warships to return to port on 26 January. The fleet finally succeeded in leaving on 20 March. Ponsborne arrived at Grenada on 24 March and landed her troops who were required to put down Fédon's rebellion. She was delayed leaving the harbour. Two days later she stranded on La Baye Reefs when leaving the harbour and became a total loss. Her crew was saved.
