= HMS Laurel (1779) =

Enterprise-class Royal Navy frigate

History

Great Britain
- Name: Laurel
- Ordered: 30 April 1778
- Builder: Thomas Raymond, Chapel, Southampton
- Laid down: 3 June 1778
- Launched: 27 October 1779
- Completed: 4 January 1780 (at Portsmouth Dockyard)
- Commissioned: October 1779
- Fate: Wrecked at Martinique 10 October 1780

General characteristics
- Class & type: 28-gun Enterprise-class sixth-rate frigate
- Tons burthen: 601 70/94 (bm)
- Length: 120 ft 8 1/2 in (36.792 m) (overall); 99 ft 6 3/4 in (30.347 m) (keel)
- Beam: 33 ft 8 1/2 in (10.3 m)
- Depth of hold: 11 ft (3.4 m)
- Sail plan: Full-rigged ship
- Complement: 200 officers and men
- Armament: Upper deck: 24 × 9-pounder guns; Quarterdeck: 4 × 6-pounder guns + 4 × 18-pounder carronades; Forecastle: 2 × 18-pounder carronades; 12 swivel guns

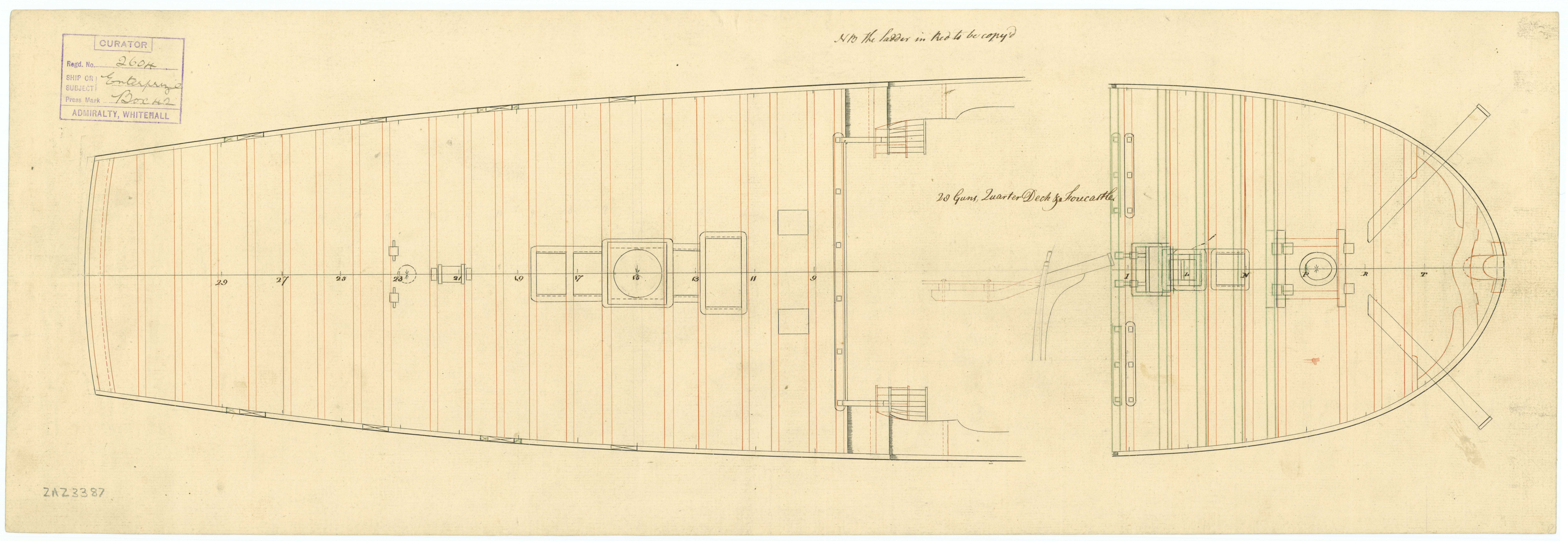

HMS Laurel was a 28-gun Enterprise-class sixth-rate frigate of the Royal Navy. Laurel was first commissioned in October 1779 under the command of Captain Thomas Lloyd. She sailed for the Leeward Islands on 13 April 1780, but was wrecked on 11 October in the Great Hurricane of 1780 at Martinique. Lloyd, and all but 12 of his crew, died.
