= Novokhopyorsky (urban locality) =

Novokhopyorsky Новохопёрский
- Urban-type settlement
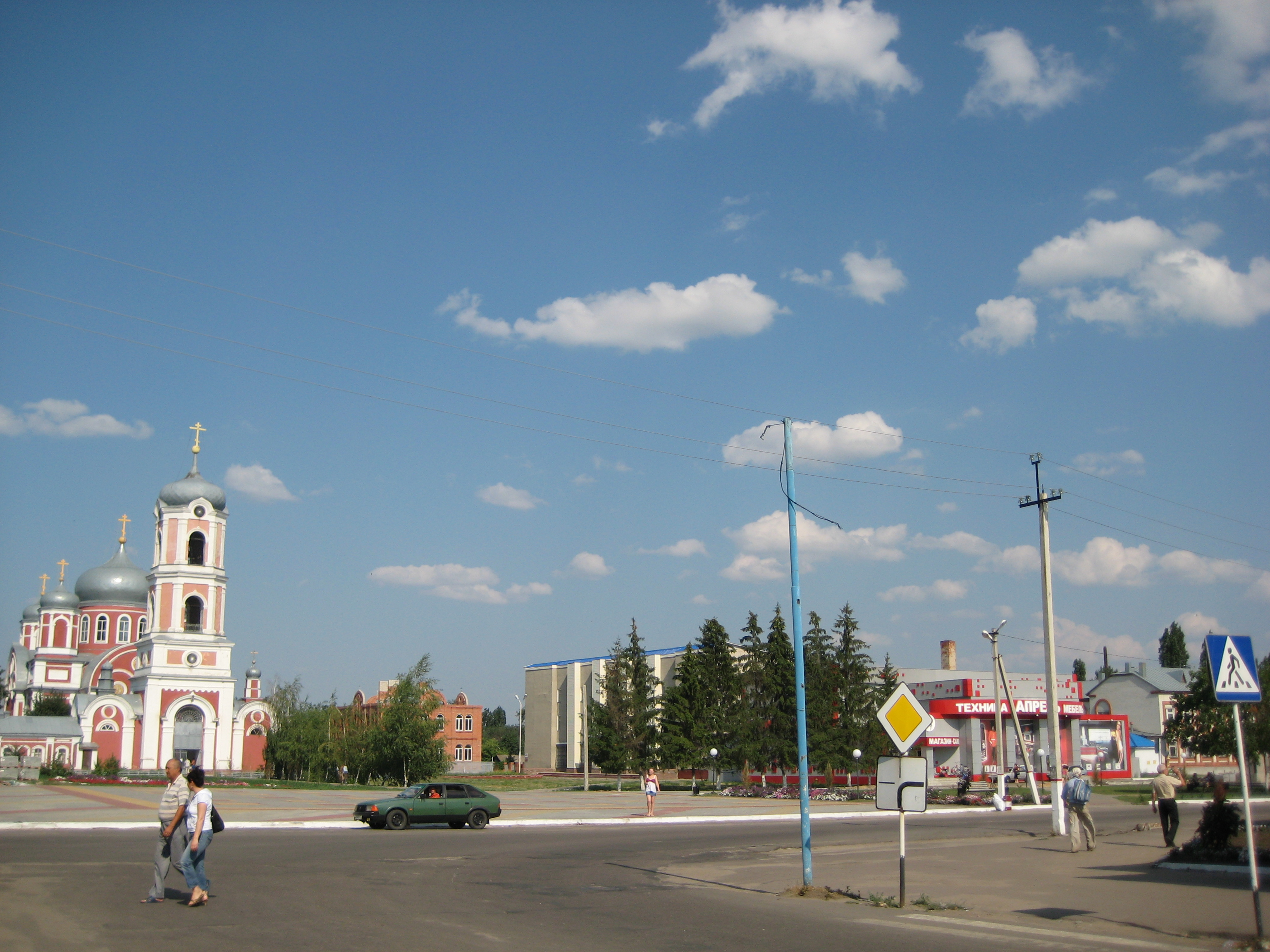
- Interactive map of Novokhopyorsky
- Location of Novokhopyorsky Novokhopyorsky (Voronezh Oblast)
- Coordinates: 51.0831°N 41.5772°E
- Country: Russia
- Federal subject: Voronezh Oblast
- Administrative district: Novokhopyorsky District

Population (2010 Census)
  - Total: 7,480
  - Estimate (2025): 7,592 (+1.5%)
- Time zone: UTC+3 (MSK)
- Postal codes: 397440, 397441, 397442
- OKTMO ID: 20627101056

Novokhopyorsky (Russian: Новохопёрский) is an urban locality (an urban-type settlement) in Novokhopyorsky District of Voronezh Oblast, Russia. Population: 7,809 (2021 census); 7,480 (2010 census); 7,774 (2002 census); 8,315 (1989 Soviet census).
