= Enterprise-class frigate =

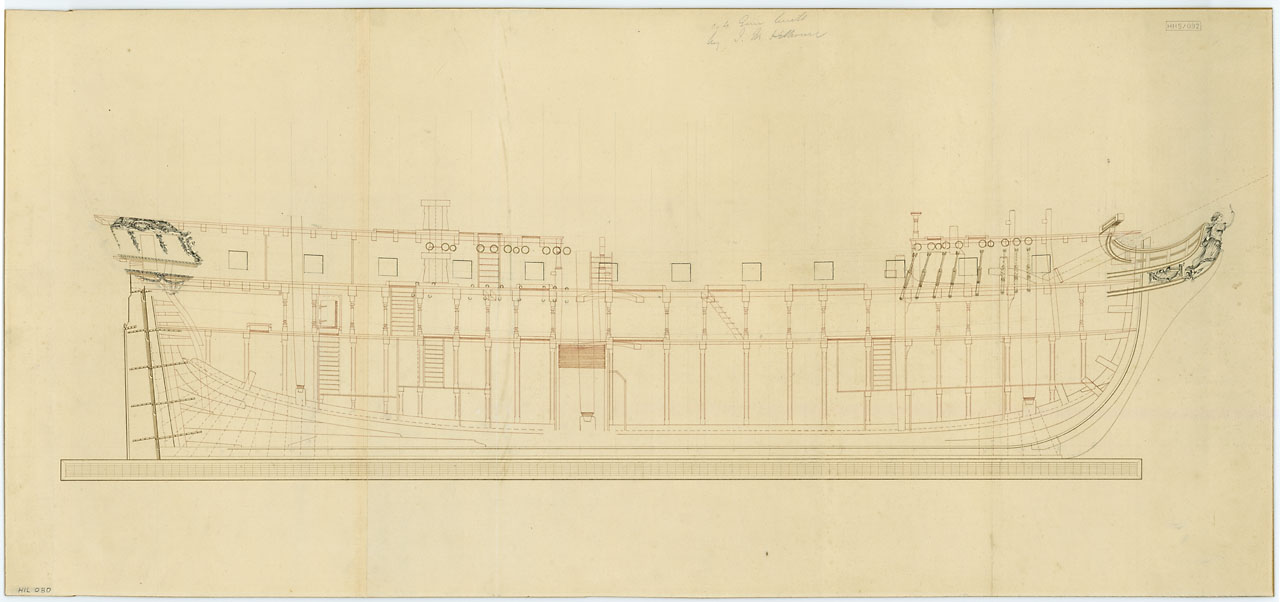
- Plan of HMS Medea

Class overview
- Built: 1771–1791
- In commission: 1775–1828
- Completed: 27

General characteristics
- Tons burthen: 593 89/94
- Length: 120 ft 6 in (36.73 m)
- Beam: 33 ft 6 in (10.21 m)
- Depth of hold: 11 ft (3.4 m)
- Sail plan: Full-rigged ship
- Complement: 200
- Armament: UD: 24 × 9-pounder guns; QD: 4 × 3-pounder guns; From 1780: UD: 24 × 9-pounder guns; QD: 4 × 6-pounder guns, 4 × 18-pounder carronades; FC: 2 × 18-pounder carronades

The Enterprise-class frigates were the final class of 28-gun sailing frigates of the sixth-rate to be produced for the Royal Navy. These twenty-seven vessels were designed in 1770 by John Williams. A first batch of five ships were ordered as part of the programme sparked by the Falklands Islands emergency. Two ships were built by contract in private shipyards, while three others were constructed in the Royal Dockyards using foreign oak.

A second batch of fifteen ships were ordered in 1776 to 1778 to meet the exigencies of the North American situation, and a final group of seven ships followed in 1782 to 1783 with only some minor modifications to include side gangways running flush with the quarterdeck and forecastle, and with solid bulkheads along the quarterdeck.

== Ships in class ==
First batch

- Siren
  - Ordered: 25 December 1770
  - Built by: John Henniker and Company, Chatham.
  - Keel laid: April 1771
  - Launched: 2 November 1773
  - Completed: 5 October 1775 at Chatham Royal Dockyard.
  - Fate: Grounded and abandoned under fire off Point Judith, Connecticut on 6 November 1777.
- Fox
  - Ordered: 25 December 1770
  - Built by: Thomas Raymond, Northam (Southampton).
  - Keel laid: May 1771
  - Launched: 2 September 1773
  - Completed: 12 February 1776 at Portsmouth Royal Dockyard.
  - Fate: Captured by the French off Brest on 11 September 1778.
- Surprise
  - Ordered: January 1771
  - Built by: Woolwich Royal Dockyard.
  - Keel laid: 5 September 1771
  - Launched: 13 April 1774
  - Completed: 15 April 1775
  - Fate: Sold at Woolwich Dockyard on 24 April 1783.
- Enterprise
  - Ordered: January 1771
  - Built by: Deptford Royal Dockyard.
  - Keel laid: 9 September 1771
  - Launched: 24 August 1774
  - Completed: 20 June 1775
  - Fate: Taken to pieces at Deptford Dockyard in August 1807.
- Actaeon
  - Ordered: 5 November 1771
  - Built by: Woolwich Royal Dockyard.
  - Keel laid: October 1772
  - Launched: 18 April 1775
  - Completed: 3 August 1775
  - Fate: Grounded off Fort Sullivan, South Carolina and burnt to avoid capture on 29 June 1776.

Second batch

- Proserpine
  - Ordered: 14 May 1776
  - Built by: John Barnard, Harwich.
  - Keel laid: June 1776
  - Launched: 7 July 1777
  - Completed: 23 September 1777 at Sheerness Dockyard.
  - Fate: Wrecked in the Elbe Estuary on 1 February 1799.
- Medea
  - Ordered: 14 May 1776
  - Built by: James Martin Hillhouse, Bristol.
  - Keel laid: June 1776
  - Launched: 28 April 1778
  - Completed: 15 September 1778 at Plymouth Dockyard.
  - Fate: Fitted as hospital ship 1801. Sold 1805.
- Andromeda
  - Ordered: 14 May 1776
  - Built by: Robert Fabian, East Cowes.
  - Keel laid: July 1776
  - Launched: 18 November 1777
  - Completed: 28 January 1778 at Portsmouth Dockyard.
  - Fate: Lost with all hands in a hurricane off Martinique on 11 October 1780.
- Aurora
  - Ordered: 3 July 1776
  - Built by: John Perry & Company, Blackwall.
  - Keel laid: July 1776
  - Launched: 7 June 1777
  - Completed: 9 August 1777 at Woolwich Dockyard.
  - Fate: Sold at Chatham on 3 November 1814.
- Sibyl
  - Ordered: 24 July 1776
  - Built by: Henry Adams, Bucklers Hard.
  - Keel laid: 10 December 1776
  - Launched: 2 January 1779
  - Completed: 13 March 1779 at Portsmouth Dockyard.
  - Fate: Wrecked off Madagascar on 26 July 1798.
- Brilliant
  - Ordered: 9 October 1776
  - Built by: Henry Adams, Bucklers Hard.
  - Keel laid: February 1777
  - Launched: 15 July 1779
  - Completed: 4 September 1779 at Portsmouth Dockyard.
  - Fate: Taken to pieces at Portsmouth Dockyard in November 1811.
- Pomona
  - Ordered: 7 March 1777
  - Built by: Thomas Raymond, Chapel (Southampton).
  - Keel laid: 8 May 1777
  - Launched: 22 September 1778
  - Completed: 17 December 1778 at Portsmouth Dockyard.
  - Fate: Taken to pieces at Portsmouth Dockyard in August 1811.
- Crescent
  - Ordered: 19 July 1777
  - Built by: James Martin Hillhouse, Bristol.
  - Keel laid: 19 August 1777
  - Launched: March 1779
  - Completed: 30 June 1779 at Plymouth Dockyard.
  - Fate: Captured by the French on 19 June 1781.
- Nemesis
  - Ordered: 30 September 1777
  - Built by: Jolly, Leathers & Barton, Liverpool.
  - Keel laid: November 1777
  - Launched: 23 January 1780
  - Completed: 22 June 1780 at Plymouth Dockyard.
  - Fate: Sold for breaking up at Plymouth Dockyard on 9 June 1814.
- Resource
  - Ordered: 30 September 1777
  - Built by: John Randall & Company, Rotherhithe.
  - Keel laid: November 1777
  - Launched: 10 August 1778
  - Completed: 2 October 1778 at Deptford Dockyard.
  - Fate: Renamed Enterprise on 17 April 1806. Sold at Deptford Dockyard on 28 August 1816.
- Mercury
  - Ordered: 22 January 1778
  - Built by: Peter Mestaer, Rotherhithe.
  - Keel laid: 25 March 1778
  - Launched: 9 December 1779
  - Completed: 24 February 1780 at Deptford Dockyard.
  - Fate: Taken to pieces at Woolwich Dockyard in January 1814.
- Pegasus
  - Ordered: 21 February 1778
  - Built by: Deptford Dockyard.
  - Keel laid: 20 June 1778
  - Launched: 1 June 1779
  - Completed: 20 July 1779.
  - Fate: Sold at Deptford Dockyard to break up on 28 August 1816.
- Cyclops
  - Ordered: 6 March 1778
  - Built by: James Menetone & Son, Limehouse.
  - Keel laid: 3 April 1778
  - Launched: 31 July 1779
  - Completed: 26 September 1779 at Deptford Dockyard.
  - Fate: Sold at Portsmouth Dockyard on 1 September 1814.
- Vestal
  - Ordered: 18 March 1778
  - Built by: Robert & John Batson, Limehouse.
  - Keel laid: 1 May 1778
  - Launched: 24 December 1779
  - Completed: 25 February 1780 at Deptford Dockyard.
  - Fate: Sold at Barbados in February 1816.
- Laurel
  - Ordered: 30 April 1778
  - Built by: Thomas Raymond, Chapel (Southampton).
  - Keel laid: 3 June 1778
  - Launched: 27 October 1779
  - Completed: 4 January 1780 at Portsmouth Dockyard.
  - Fate: Wrecked in a hurricane off Martinique on 11 October 1780.

Third batch

- Thisbe
  - Ordered: 23 February 1782
  - Built by: Thomas King, Dover.
  - Keel laid: September 1782
  - Launched: 25 November 1783
  - Completed: 19 April 1784 at Deptford Dockyard.
  - Fate: Sold to be broken up, 9 August 1815.
- Circe
  - Ordered: 6 March 1782
  - Built by: Henry Ladd, Dover.
  - Keel laid: December 1782
  - Launched: 30 September 1785
  - Completed: 2 November 1790 at Woolwich Dockyard.
  - Fate: Wrecked off Great Yarmouth on 17 November 1803.
- Rose
  - Ordered: 15 March 1782
  - Built by: Joshua Stewart & Hall, Sandgate.
  - Keel laid: June 1782
  - Launched: 1 July 1783
  - Completed: 23 October 1783 at Deptford Dockyard.
  - Fate: Wrecked off Jamaica on 28 June 1794.
- Hussar
  - Ordered: 26 March 1782
  - Built by: Fabian, Clayton & Willson, Sandgate.
  - Keel laid: June 1782
  - Launched: 1 September 1784
  - Completed: November 1787 at Deptford Dockyard.
  - Fate: Wrecked off Brittany 27 December 1796
- Alligator
  - Ordered: 7 May 1782
  - Built by: Philemon Jacobs, Sandgate.
  - Keel laid: December 1782
  - Launched: 18 April 1787
  - Completed: 18 July 1790 at Deptford Dockyard.
  - Fate: Sold at Plymouth Dockyard 21 July 1814.
- Dido
  - Ordered: 5 June 1782
  - Built by: Joshua Stuart & Hall, Sandgate.
  - Keel laid: September 1782
  - Launched: 27 November 1784
  - Completed: October 1787 at Portsmouth Dockyard.
  - Fate: Sold at Portsmouth Dockyard on 3 April 1817.
- Lapwing
  - Ordered: 22 October 1782
  - Built by: Thomas King, Dover.
  - Keel laid: February 1783
  - Launched: 21 September 1785
  - Completed: 19 May 1791 at Woolwich Dockyard.
  - Fate: Taken to pieces at Plymouth Dockyard in May 1828.
