= List of shipwrecks in 1795 =

The list of shipwrecks in 1795 includes ships sunk, foundered, wrecked, grounded or otherwise lost during 1795.

table of contents
1795
Jan	Feb	Mar	Apr
May	Jun	Jul	Aug
Sep	Oct	Nov	Dec
Unknown date

== January ==
=== 2 January ===
List of shipwrecks: 2 January 1795
Ship	State	Description
Hope	Great Britain	War of the First Coalition. The ship was captured and burnt by a French frigate. She was on a voyage from Alicante, Spain to London

=== 5 January ===
List of shipwrecks: 5 January 1795
Ship	State	Description
Pandora	Great Britain	War of the First Coalition: The ship was captured by the privateer Unité (France) and was burnt. She was on a voyage from Spain to London.

=== 6 January ===
List of shipwrecks: 6 January 1795
Ship	State	Description
Orb	Great Britain	The ship was wrecked on Sable Island, British America. She was on a voyage from Liverpool, Lancashire to Halifax, Nova Scotia, British America.

=== 19 January ===
List of shipwrecks: 19 January 1795
Ship	State	Description
Unnamed	Great Britain	The ship was driven into by a number of vessels in the River Thames at London and was wrecked.

=== 21 January ===
List of shipwrecks: 21 January 1795
Ship	State	Description
William and Thomas	Great Britain	The ship departed from Jamaica for Liverpool, Lancashire. No further trace, presumed foundered with the loss of all hands.

=== 23 January ===
List of shipwrecks: 23 January 1795
Ship	State	Description
King of Spain	Great Britain	The ship departed from Jamaica for Georgia, United States. No further trace, presumed foundered with the loss of all hands.

=== 26 January ===
List of shipwrecks: 26 January 1795
Ship	State	Description
Scipion	French Navy	The Saint-Esprit-class ship of the line was wrecked in the Bay of Biscay off Brest, Finistère.

=== 28 January ===
List of shipwrecks: 28 December 1794
Ship	State	Description
Neptune	French Navy	The ship of the line ran aground and was wrecked in the Bay of Peros, Finistère with the loss of fifty of her crew.

=== 29 January ===
List of shipwrecks: 29 January 1795
Ship	State	Description
Neuf Thermidor	French Navy	The ship of the line foundered in the Bay of Biscay off Brest, France, Finistère in a storm.

=== 30 January ===
List of shipwrecks: 30 January 1795
Ship	State	Description
Superbe	French Navy	The Téméraire-class ship of the line foundered in a storm.

=== Unknown date ===
List of shipwrecks: Unknown date in January 1795
Ship	State	Description
Anna Magdalena	Sweden	The ship was driven ashore in the Orkney Islands, Great Britain. She was on a voyage from Gothenburg to Barcelona, Spain.
Anna Maria	Sweden	The ship was driven ashore 6 nautical miles (11 km) from Kuressaare, Russia. She was on a voyage from Gothenburg to Riga, Russia.
Ann and Jane	Great Britain	The ship foundered in the North Sea off Great Yarmouth, Norfolk. Her crew were rescued.
Apollo	Great Britain	The ship was lost near Cádiz, Spain. Her crew were rescued.
Bee	Great Britain	The ship was lost in the Mull of Galloway. She was on a voyage from São Miguel Island, Azores to Whitehaven, Cumberland.
Betsey	Great Britain	The ship was run down and sunk. Her crew were rescued by HMS Adventure ( (Kingdom of Great Britain) Royal Navy). Betsey was on a voyage from Livorno, Grand Duchy of Tuscany to London.
Caroline	Great Britain	The ship was driven ashore near Boulogne, Pas-de-Calais, France. She was on a voyage from Virginia, United States to London.
Daniel	Great Britain	The ship was lost in the River Avon. She was on a voyage from the Isle of Man to Bristol, Gloucestershire.
Endeavour	Great Britain	The ship was lost near Middelburg, Zeeland, Dutch Republic. She was on a voyage from Middelburg to London.
Fame	Great Britain	The ship was wrecked at the mouth of the Ebro. She was on a voyage from Catalonia, Spain to Portsmouth, Hampshire.
Favourite Harry	Great Britain	The ship was driven ashore by ice in the River Thames at Cuckold's Point, Surrey. She was on a voyage from South Shields, County Durham to London.
Friends	Great Britain	The ship foundered. Her crew were rescued by Eliza (Ireland).
Hertin Carlb	Flag unknown	The ship was driven ashore and wrecked at Great Yarmouth with the loss of nine of her crew.
Hope	Ireland	The ship was driven ashore near Ballycastle, County Antrim. She was on a voyage from Alicante, Spain to Newry, County Antrim.
Hope	Ireland	War of the First Coalition: The ship was captured and sunk by the French. She was on a voyage from Alicante to Dublin.
Jane	Great Britain	The ship foundered off the Shetland Islands. She was on a voyage from Saint Petersburg, Russia to Liverpool, Lancashire.
K 32	Great Britain	The transport ship was driven ashore and wrecked in the Hamoaze.
Live Oak	Great Britain	The ship was lost near Cádiz. Her crew were rescued.
Lord Howe	Great Britain	The ship foundered in the North Sea off Cromer, Norfolk. She was on a voyage from Saint Petersburg, Russia to Great Yarmouth.
Myrtle	Great Britain	The ship foundered. She was on a voyage from Palermo, Sicily to Lisbon, Portugal and London.
Nancy	Great Britain	The ship was lost in the Orkney Islands. She was on a voyage from Saint Petersburg to Dundee, Forfarshire.
Rover	Great Britain	The ship was lost in Cádiz Bay. Her crew were rescued.
St Magnus	Bremen	The ship sank in the Weser. She was on a voyage from London to Bremen.
Trusty	United States	The ship was driven ashore and wrecked at Porto, Portugal. She was on a voyage from Philadelphia, Pennsylvania, to Porto.
Young Richard	Great Britain	The ship was lost on the coast of Scotland. She was on a voyage from Danzig to London.

== =2 February ==
List of shipwrecks: 2 February 1795
Ship	State	Description
Unnamed	Flag unknown	The West Indiaman was wrecked at Milltown Malbay, County Clare, Ireland.

=== 4 February ===
List of shipwrecks: 4 February 1795
Ship	State	Description
William	Great Britain	The ship foundered 20 leagues (60 nautical miles (110 km)) south east of Brest, Finistère, France with the loss of all but four of her crew. She was on a voyage from Jamaica to London.

=== 24 February ===
List of shipwrecks: 24 February 1795
Ship	State	Description
Fanny	Great Britain	The ship was wrecked in Irving's Bay, Grenada.

=== Unknown date ===
List of shipwrecks: Unknown date in February 1795
Ship	State	Description
Alert	United States	The schooner was driven ashore at "Little Corner Shute", Devon, Great Britain. She was on a voyage from Le Havre, Seine-Inférieure, France to New York.
Atlantic	Great Britain	The ship was wrecked near Flamborough Head, Yorkshire.
Biscay	Great Britain	The ship was lost in Tor Bay with all hands. She was on a voyage from London to Exeter, Devon.
Catherine	Great Britain	The transport ship was driven ashore and wrecked in the River Thames.
Chance	United States	The ship foundered in the Atlantic Ocean off Madeira, Portugal.
Charlotte	Great Britain	The ship was driven ashore and wrecked at Falmouth, Cornwall.
Chesterfield Packet	Great Britain	The ship ran aground at Milford Haven, Pembrokeshire. She was on a voyage from Waterford, Ireland to Milford Haven, Pembrokeshire. She was refloated.
Esland	Sweden	The ship was driven ashore at Margate, Kent, Great Britain with the loss of three of her crew. She was on a voyage from Stockholm to Belfast, County Down, Ireland.
Freundschaft	(Sweden) Swedish Pomerania	The ship was driven ashore at Pillau, Prussia. She was on a voyage from London to Rügenwalde
Friendship	Great Britain	The ship was driven ashore at Courtmacsherry, County Cork, Ireland. She was on a voyage from Limerick, Ireland to London.
Friendship	Great Britain	The ship foundered in the Atlantic ocean off Madeira with the loss of all hands.
Gabriel	Hamburg	The ship was driven ashore at Newhaven, Sussex, Great Britain. She was on a voyage from Liverpool, Lancashire, Great Britain to Hamburg.
Generous Friends	Great Britain	The ship was wrecked on the coast of Wales. She was on a voyage from Liverpool to Teignmouth, Devon.
George	Great Britain	The ship was wrecked near Donaghadee, County Down with the loss of all hands.
Hannah	Great Britain	The ship was driven ashore at Lowestoft, Suffolk. She was on a voyage from Porto, Portugal to King's Lynn, Norfolk.
Jean Marie	France	War of the First Coalition: The transport ship was captured and scuttled by HMS Artois, HMS Galatea and HMS Pomona (all (Kingdom of Great Britain) Royal Navy) between 12 and 26 February.
Juliana	Great Britain	The ship was run down and sunk in the English Channel off The Lizard. Her crew were rescued. She was on a voyage from Swansea, Glamorgan to Exeter, Devon.
Juno	Great Britain	The ship was destroyed by fire in the River Avon. She was on a voyage from Málaga to Bristol, Gloucestershire.
La Anne	France	War of the First Coalition: The transport ship was captured and scuttled by HMS Artois, HMS Galatea and HMS Pomona (all (Kingdom of Great Britain) Royal Navy) between 12 and 26 February.
La Debat de la Flotte	France	War of the First Coalition: The transport ship was captured and burnt by HMS Artois, HMS Galatea and HMS Pomona (all (Kingdom of Great Britain) Royal Navy) between 12 and 26 February.
La Desirée	France	War of the First Coalition: The transport ship was captured and burnt by HMS Artois, HMS Galatea and HMS Pomona (all (Kingdom of Great Britain) Royal Navy) between 12 and 26 February.
La Espieuse	France	War of the First Coalition: The transport ship was captured and burnt by HMS Artois, HMS Galatea and HMS Pomona (all (Kingdom of Great Britain) Royal Navy) between 12 and 26 February.
La Graley	France	War of the First Coalition: The transport ship was captured and scuttled by HMS Artois, HMS Galatea and HMS Pomona (all (Kingdom of Great Britain) Royal Navy) between 12 and 26 February.
La Guerrier	France	War of the First Coalition: The transport ship was captured and burnt by HMS Artois, HMS Galatea and HMS Pomona (all (Kingdom of Great Britain) Royal Navy) between 12 and 26 February.
La Liberté	France	War of the First Coalition: The transport ship was captured and burnt by HMS Artois, HMS Galatea and HMS Pomona (all (Kingdom of Great Britain) Royal Navy) between 12 and 26 February.
La Margente	France	War of the First Coalition: The transport ship was captured and burnt by HMS Artois, HMS Galatea and HMS Pomona (all (Kingdom of Great Britain) Royal Navy) between 12 and 26 February.
La Peera	France	War of the First Coalition: The transport ship was captured and scuttled by HMS Artois, HMS Galatea and HMS Pomona (all (Kingdom of Great Britain) Royal Navy) between 12 and 26 February.
Lewis	Great Britain	The ship was driven ashore and wrecked at Portland, Dorset. She was on a voyage from Weymouth, Dorset to Exeter and Cádiz, Spain.
Lord Auckland	Great Britain	The ship was lost whilst on a voyage from Gibraltar to Guernsey, Channel Islands.
Martinico Packet	Great Britain	The ship was driven ashore and severely damaged at Falmouth, Cornwall.
Minerva	Great Britain	The ship was driven ashore at Eyemouth, Berwickshire. She was on a voyage from London to Bo'ness, Lothian.
Monmouth	Great Britain	War of the First Coalition: The ship was captured by the French. She was recaptured by HM hired ship London Packet ( (Kingdom of Great Britain) Royal Navy) but was subsequently wrecked in the Isles of Scilly with the loss of two of her crew.
Nancy	Great Britain	The ship foundered in the Irish Sea off Slimehead while on a voyage from Bristol to Westport, County Mayo, Ireland.
Nancy	Great Britain	War of the First Coalition: The ship was captured by the French. She subsequently foundered. Her crew were rescued.
Nautilus	Great Britain	The whaler was destroyed by fire at Whitby, Yorkshire. She was on a voyage from Whitby to the Davis Strait.
Owen	Great Britain	The ship was abandoned in the Atlantic Ocean off Madeira, Portugal while on a voyage from Liverpool to the West Indies. Her crew were rescued. She subsequently drove ashore on Porto Santo Island.
Peggy	Ireland	The ship was driven ashore in the Isle of Man. She was on a voyage from Belfast to Liverpool.
Rachael	Great Britain	The ship was lost at Ancona, Papal States. She was on a voyage from Cornwall to Venice.
Rachel	Great Britain	The transport ship was driven ashore and wrecked at Deal, Kent.
Recovery	Great Britain	The ship foundered in the Atlantic Ocean off Madeira.
Resolution	United States	The ship was wrecked on the Red Sand, in the North Sea off the coast of Essex, Great Britain. Her crew were rescued. She was on a voyage from Baltimore, Maryland to Amsterdam, North Holland, Batavian Republic.
Rose	Great Britain	The ship was driven ashore at Lowestoft. She was on a voyage from Hull, Yorkshire to London.
St. Francisco de Padua	Spain	The ship sank at Castlehaven, County Cork, Ireland. She was on a voyage from St. Andero to Bristol.
Trois Frerers	France	War of the First Coalition: The transport ship was captured and burnt by HMS Artois, HMS Galatea and HMS Pomona (all (Kingdom of Great Britain) Royal Navy) between 12 and 26 February.
Unity	Great Britain	War of the First Coalition The ship was captured and sunk by the French off the Isles of Scilly. She was on a voyage from Porto to Liverpool.
Will	Great Britain	The ship was driven ashore at Liverpool.

== March ==
=== 7 March ===
List of shipwrecks: 7 March 1795
Ship	State	Description
Clio	(Kingdom of Great Britain) Guernsey	War of the First Coalition The ship was captured off Gibraltar by ten French warships and was burnt. She was on a voyage from Barcelona, Spain to Guernsey.

=== 16 March ===
List of shipwrecks: 16 March 1795
Ship	State	Description
Hired armed lugger Daphne	Royal Navy	The hired armed lugger was driven ashore and severely damaged at Weymouth, Dorset.

=== Unknown date ===
List of shipwrecks: Unknown date in March 1795
Ship	State	Description
Alexander	Great Britain	The ship was wrecked on the south coast of the Isle of Wight while on a voyage from Youghall, County Cork, Ireland to London.
Alice	Great Britain	War of the First Coalition: The ship was captured by the French and sent in to Brest, Finistère, but was lost going into that port. She was on a voyage from Barbados to Liverpool, Lancashire.
Archer	Great Britain	War of the First Coalition: The ship foundered off the coast of France. Her crew survived but were made prisoners. She was on a voyage from Cardiff, Glamorgan to London.
Catherine and Mary	Great Britain	The ship was wrecked at Padstow, Cornwall while on a voyage from Youghall to Southampton, Hampshire.
Chambers	Great Britain	The ship foundered off Wexford, Ireland while on a voyage from Jamaica to Liverpool, Lancashire.
Christian VII	Hamburg	The ship sank in the Elbe. She was on a voyage from London to Hamburg.
Fortune	Great Britain	The ship foundered in the Firth of Forth. She was on a voyage from Montrose, Forfarshire to London.
Hebe	Great Britain	The ship capsized at Faro, Portugal, She was on a voyage from Faro to Liverpool.
John and Henriette	Ireland	The ship was driven ashore at "Benecarlo", Spain. She was on a voyage from Barcelona, Spain to Dublin.
Lively	Ireland	War of the First Coalition: The ship was captured and sunk by Tourtourelle (French Navy).
Margaretta Dorothea	Hamburg	The ship sank in the Elbe. She was on a voyage from London to Hamburg.
Neutrality	(Denmark) Norway	The ship was wrecked near Kirkwall, Orkney Islands. She was on a voyage from Mandahl to "St. Cruz".
Nostra Señora D'Epler	Spain	The ship was driven ashore on the south coast of the Isle of Wight. She was on a voyage from Bilbao to London.
Olive Branch	Great Britain	The ship foundered in the Atlantic Ocean off Cádiz, Spain with the loss of a crew member.
Peggy	Great Britain	The ship was driven ashore at Padstow. She was on a voyage from Newry, County Antrim, Ireland to London.
Prudent	Great Britain	The ship was wrecked on the Haisborough Sands, in the North Sea off the coast of Norfolk with the loss of seven of her crew.
Rachael	Great Britain	The ship was wrecked at Padstow while on a voyage from New York, United States to Cork, Ireland.
Sprightly	Great Britain	War of the First Coalition: The brig was captured and sunk by Tourtourelle (French Navy).
HMS Swiftsure	(Kingdom of Great Britain) Royal Navy	The third rate ship-of-the-line struck the Harbour Rock, Cork and was damaged. She was later repaired and returned to service.
Three Brothers	Great Britain	The ship was wrecked at Padstow while on a voyage from Youghall to Portsmouth, Hampshire.

== April ==
=== 4 April ===
List of shipwrecks: 4 April 1795
Ship	State	Description
Triumfo	Great Britain	War of the First Coalition: The brig was captured in the Atlantic Ocean by three French frigates and was sunk. She was on a voyage from Bristol, Gloucestershire, Great Britain to St. Andero.

=== 13 April ===
List of shipwrecks: 13 April 1795
Ship	State	Description
Hamilton	United States	The ship foundered. Her crew were rescued. She was on a voyage from Brest, Finistère, France to Virginia.

=== 24 April ===
List of shipwrecks: 24 April 1795
Ship	State	Description
Galathée	French Navy	The Galathée-class frigate ran aground and was wrecked off Penmarc'h, Finistère.

=== Unknown date ===
List of shipwrecks: Unknown date in April 1795
Ship	State	Description
Ceres	Great Britain	The ship was in collision with another vessel and sank in the River Thames near Gravesend, Kent. She was on a voyage from Ross-on-Wye, Herefordshire to London.
City of Altona	Great Britain	The ship was lost on the French coast. She was on a voyage from Lisbon, Portugal to London.
Industry	Great Britain	The ship was driven ashore near Torbay, Devon. She was on a voyage from Dartmouth, Devon to Newfoundland, British America.
La Felicité	France	War of the First Coalition: The ship was captured and destroyed off the French coast by a Royal Navy squadron under the command of Sir John Borlase Warren.
La Resolution	France	The ship was captured and sunk off the coast of France by a Royal Navy squadron under to command of Sir John Borlase Warren.
Minerva	Great Britain	The ship caught fire and was scuttled in the River Thames. She was on a voyage from London to Boston, carrying aqua fortis.
William	Great Britain	The ship was lost on the Spanish coast. She was on a voyage from Barcelona to Valencia.

== May ==
=== 1 May ===
List of shipwrecks: 1 May 1795
Ship	State	Description
HMS Boyne	(Kingdom of Great Britain) Royal Navy	HMS Boyne The Boyne-class ship of the line caught fire, exploded and sank off Spithead, Hampshire with the loss of eleven of her crew and that of two on board HMS Queen Charlotte ( (Kingdom of Great Britain) Royal Navy). The wreck was dispersed on 30 August 1838.

=== Unknown date ===
List of shipwrecks: Unknown date in May 1795
Ship	State	Description
Gannet	Great Britain	The ship foundered. She was on a voyage from St Mary's, Isles of Scilly to London.
Recovery	Great Britain	The ship was wrecked at St Mary's, Isles of Scilly. She was on a voyage from Savannah, Georgia, United States to Falmouth, Cornwall.
Seine	Great Britain	The ship was lost at the mouth of the Weser. She was on a voyage from London to Bremen.
St. Joseph	Spain	The ship was driven ashore near "Toreko", Sweden. She was on a voyage from Cádiz to Saint Petersburg, Russia.
Susannah	Great Britain	The ship was driven ashore and wrecked near Bridport, Dorset. She was on a voyage from Waterford, Ireland to Chichester, Sussex.
Two Brothers	Great Britain	The ship was driven ashore crewless at Winterton-on-Sea, Norfolk. She was on a voyage from Barton upon Humber, Lincolnshire to Great Yarmouth, Norfolk.

== June ==
=== 5 June ===
List of shipwrecks: 5 June 1795
Ship	State	Description
Ceres	Great Britain	War of the First Coalition: The ship was captured by Sémillante (French Navy) and was burnt. She was on a voyage from South Shields, County Durham to Gibraltar.

=== 12 June ===
List of shipwrecks: 1w June 1795
Ship	State	Description
Alexander, Aurora, Mère Cherie, Simple, St. Nicholas, and Young Charles	Flag unknown United States; France; Flag unknown Stralsund; Flag unknown	Aurora was destroyed by fire at Paimbœuf, Loire-Inférieure with the loss of four lives. The fire spread to Alexander, Mère Cherie, Simple, St. Nicholas and Young Charles, which were also destroyed.

=== 13 June ===
List of shipwrecks: 13 June 1795
Ship	State	Description
Pallas	United States	The ship foundered in the English Channel off Dunkerque, Nord, France. She was on a voyage from Altona, Hamburg to Lisbon, Portugal.

=== 15 June ===
List of shipwrecks: 15 June 1795
Ship	State	Description
Thomas	Great Britain	The ship foundered in the Atlantic Ocean off Sal, Cape Verde Islands, Portugal whilst on a voyage from Africa to the West Indies. Her crew were rescued.

=== 18 June ===
List of shipwrecks: 18 June 1795
Ship	State	Description
Hector	Great Britain	The ship was lost whilst on a voyage from British Honduras to London.

=== 19 June ===
List of shipwrecks: 19 June 1795
Ship	State	Description
Thomas	Great Britain	The ship was lost in the Cape Verde Islands. Her crew were rescued. She was on a voyage from Africa to the West Indies.

=== 20 June ===
List of shipwrecks: 20 June 1795
Ship	State	Description
Ariadne	Great Britain	The ship was destroyed by fire at Dublin, Ireland.

=== Unknown date ===
List of shipwrecks: Unknown date in June 1795
Ship	State	Description
Agatha Phillipina	Danzig	The ship was driven ashore near Copenhagen, Denmark. She was on a voyage from Danzig to London, Great Britain.
Concordia Frederica	Stettin	The ship was lost near "Moderglt". She was on a voyage from Stettin to Liverpool, Lancashire, Great Britain.
Druid	Great Britain	War of the First Coalition: The brig foundered with the loss of all hands. She was on a voyage from Hull, Yorkshire to Cádiz, Spain. She was in a convoy under the command of Admiral Mann.
Lewis	Great Britain	The ship was driven ashore near Portland Castle, Dorset.
Pandora	Great Britain	The ship caught fire and foundered off the Orkney Islands.
Queen Charlotte	Great Britain	The ship was wrecked at Hurst, Dorset.
Union	Great Britain	The ship was driven ashore. She was on a voyage from Liverpool to New York, United States.

== July ==
=== 13 July ===
List of shipwrecks: 13 July 1795
Ship	State	Description
Alcide	French Navy	Battle of Hyères Islands: The Pégase-class ship of the line caught fire and exploded with the loss of 300 of her 600 crew.

=== Unknown date ===
List of shipwrecks: Unknown date in July 1795
Ship	State	Description
Kitty	Great Britain	War of the First Coalition: The ship was captured by the French in the Dogger Bank and was burnt. She was on a voyage from Sandwich, Kent to Memel, Prussia.
Phœnix	Great Britain	The ship was driven ashore at Orfordness, Suffolk.
St. James	Great Britain	War of the First Coalition: The ship was captured in the Mediterranean Sea by a French frigate and was burnt.

== August ==
=== 1 August ===
List of shipwrecks: 2 August 1795
Ship	State	Description
Sarah and Ann	Great Britain	The ship struck rocks at Nevis and foundered. She was on a voyage from Nevis to London.

=== 2 August ===
List of shipwrecks: 2 August 1795
Ship	State	Description
HMS Diomede	(Kingdom of Great Britain) Royal Navy	The Roebuck-class ship of the line struck a rock and foundered at Trincomalee, Ceylon. Her crew survived.

=== 11 August ===
List of shipwrecks: 11 August 1795
Ship	State	Description
Solicitor General	Great Britain	The ship was lost on the Barbary Coast. She was on a voyage from Liverpool, Lancashire to Africa.

=== 24 August ===
List of shipwrecks: 24 August 1795
Ship	State	Description
Providence	Ireland	War of the First Coalition: The ship was captured by Ranger (French Navy). She was burnt. Providence was on a voyage from Belfast, County Antrim to Jamaica.

=== Unknown date ===
List of shipwrecks: Unknown date in August 1795
Ship	State	Description
Harald Haarsager	Flag unknown	The ship was driven ashore at Dover, Kent, Great Britain. She was on a voyage from Smyrna, Ottoman Empire to Saint Petersburg, Russia.
Johan Jacob	Stettin	The ship was wrecked at Skagen, Denmark. She was on a voyage from Stettin to London, Great Britain.
Johanna	Great Britain	The ship was lost on the Runnel Stone. Her crew were rescued. She was on a voyage from Bristol, Gloucestershire to Penzance, Cornwall.
New Hope	Great Britain	The ship was lost in Delagoa Bay, Africa.
Nidrotia	(Denmark) Danish Asiatic Company	The ship was wrecked on Anholt. She was on a voyage from Bengal, India to Copenhagen.
Pegasus	Great Britain	The ship was driven ashore at Kingsgate, Kent. She was on a voyage from London to the West Indies.
Prince William	Great Britain	The ship was lost 8 leagues (24 nautical miles (44 km)) from Portland, Dorset. She was on a voyage from Waterford, Ireland to Southampton, Hampshire.
Rebecca	Ireland	The ship sank in the River Liffey. She was on a voyage from Porto, Portugal to Dublin.
Spy	Great Britain	The transport ship was lost near Dungeness, Kent. Her crew were rescued.
Swift	Great Britain	The ship was lost at Skagen, Denmark. She was on a voyage from Gothenburg, Sweden to Banff.
Unge Johannes	Flag unknown	The ship was lost on the Portuguese coast. She was on a voyage from Brest Finistère, France to Livorno, Grand Duchy of Tuscany.

== September ==
=== 2 September ===
List of shipwrecks: 2 September 1795
Ship	State	Description
Hughley	Batavian Republic	The ship was destroyed by fire. Her crew were rescued. She was on a voyage from Saint Helena to London, Great Britain.

=== 5 September ===
List of shipwrecks: 5 September 1795
Ship	State	Description
Surcheance	Batavian Republic	The East Indiaman foundered whilst on a voyage from Saint Helena to London, Great Britain.

=== 6 September ===
List of shipwrecks: 6 September 1795
Ship	State	Description
Dibel-Shley-Yung (Дибель-шлей-юнг)	Imperial Russian Navy	The transport ship sprang a leak and sank off Hogland with the loss of one life. She was on a voyage from Kronstadt to Kotka, Old Finland.

=== 9 September ===
List of shipwrecks: 9 September 1795
Ship	State	Description
Elizabeth	Great Britain	War of the First Coalition: The ship was captured and burnt by the French. She was on a voyage from Jamaica to London.
Jessie	Great Britain	War of the First Coalition: The ship was captured and burnt by the French. She was on a voyage from Jamaica to London.

=== 27 September ===
List of shipwrecks: 27 September 1795
Ship	State	Description
Sarda	Great Britain	The ship foundered in the Baltic Sea off Ekenäs, Finland. Her crew were rescued. She was on a voyage from London to Saint Petersburg, Russia.

=== 29 September ===
List of shipwrecks: 29 September 1795
Ship	State	Description
Ashley	Great Britain	War of the First Coalition: The ship was captured in the Atlantic Ocean off Cape St. Vincent, Portugal by the French and was sunk.
Pomona	Great Britain	War of the First Coalition: The ship was captured in the Atlantic Ocean off Cape St. Vincent by the French and was sunk.

=== Unknown date ===
List of shipwrecks: Unknown in September date 1795
Ship	State	Description
Apollo	Great Britain	The ship was driven ashore on Bornholm, Denmark. She was on a voyage from Aberdeen to a Baltic port.
Betsey	Great Britain	War of the First Coalition: The ship was captured off the coast of Portugal by a French squadron and was scuttled. She was on a voyage from London to Málaga, Spain.
Brothers	Great Britain	War of the First Coalition: The ship was captured off the coast of Portugal by a French squadron and was scuttled. She was on a voyage from Cádiz, Spain to London.
Friends Goodwill	Great Britain	War of the First Coalition: The ship was captured off the coast of Portugal by a French squadron and was scuttled. She was on a voyage from Málaga to London.
Jeanie	Great Britain	The ship was driven ashore on the coast of Jutland. She was on a voyage from the Firth of Forth to Gothenburg, Sweden.
Providence	Great Britain	War of the First Coalition: The ship was captured and sunk in the North Sea by the privateer Vengeux (France).
Recovery	Ireland	War of the First Coalition: The ship was captured off the coast of Portugal by a French squadron and was scuttled. She was on a voyage from Dublin to Málaga
Roebuck	Great Britain	The sloop was driven ashore at Wick, Caithness. She was on a voyage from Gothenburg, Sweden to Galloway, Ayrshire.
Unity	Great Britain	War of the First Coalition: The ship was captured off the coast of Portugal by a French squadron and was scuttled. She was on a voyage from Málaga to London.

== October ==
=== 2 October ===
List of shipwrecks: 2 October 1795
Ship	State	Description
Jupiter	(Kingdom of Great Britain) Jersey	The ship foundered in the Grand Banks of Newfoundland.

=== 4 October ===
List of shipwrecks: 4 October 1795
Ship	State	Description
Gloucester	Great Britain	War of the First Coalition: The ship was captured and sunk by Décade (French Navy). She was on a voyage from Málaga, Spain to Gloucester.

=== 5 October ===
List of shipwrecks: 5 October 1795
Ship	State	Description
Active	United States	The brig was wrecked in the Sept-Îles, Côtes du Nord, France. Her crew reached Guernsey, Channel Islands in a boat.

=== 9 October ===
List of shipwrecks: 9 October 1795
Ship	State	Description
Unnamed	Great Britain	The ship was wrecked on "Murra", Shetland Islands with the loss of all hands.

=== 11 October ===
List of shipwrecks: 11 October 1795
Ship	State	Description
Lovets (Ловец, 'Catcher')	Imperial Russian Navy	The transport ship was holed by ice and sank at Arkhangelsk in the mouth of the Maymaksa, a major distributary of the Northern Dvina.

=== 12 October ===
List of shipwrecks: 12 October 1795
Ship	State	Description
Phillis	Great Britain	The ship was wrecked at Port aux Basque, Newfoundland, British America with the loss of three of those on board.

=== 15 October ===
List of shipwrecks: 15 October 1795
Ship	State	Description
Jemima	Great Britain	The brig collided with the brig Fanny in the North Sea and sank with the loss of all but one of her crew. Jemima was on a voyage from South Shields, County Durham to Lisbon, Portugal.

=== 19 October ===
List of shipwrecks: 19 October 1795
Ship	State	Description
Daphne	Great Britain	The ship was lost off Gotland, Sweden. She was on a voyage from Hull, Yorkshire to Saint Petersburg, Russia.
Jenny	Great Britain	The ship was run down and sunk in the North Sea north of Cromer, Norfolk. Her crew were rescued. She was on a voyage from Newcastle upon Tyne, Northumberland to London.

=== 20 October ===
List of shipwrecks: 20 October 1795
Ship	State	Description
Nabby	Great Britain	The ship was wrecked on the coast of Ireland with the loss of two of her crew. She was on a voyage from Liverpool, Lancashire to Boston, Massachusetts, United States.

=== 23 October ===
List of shipwrecks: 23 October 1795
Ship	State	Description
Favourite	Great Britain	The ship was driven ashore in Stokes Bay.
Peggy	Great Britain	The transport ship was driven ashore in Stokes Bay.

=== 24 October ===
List of shipwrecks: 24 October 1795
Ship	State	Description
Ann	Great Britain	The ship was dismasted and was abandoned by her crew. She was on a voyage from Liverpool, Lancashire to Galway, Ireland.
Two unnamed vessels	Flags unknown	The brigs foundered off Holyhead, Anglesey , Great Britain with the loss of all hands.

=== 27 October ===
List of shipwrecks: 27 October 1795
Ship	State	Description
Endeavour	New South Wales	The ship was cut adrift during a heavy gale in Dusky Sound, New Zealand, en route from Sydney to the Brazilian whaling grounds.

=== 30 October ===
List of shipwrecks: 30 October 1795
Ship	State	Description
Chaming Sally	Great Britain	The ship foundered in the Dogger Bank. Her crew were rescued.

=== Unknown date ===
List of shipwrecks: Unknown date in October 1795
Ship	State	Description
Braganza	Portugal	The ship struck a reef off the mouth of the Tagas and sank with the loss of all but one of crew.
Catherina Elizabeth	Sweden	The ship was wrecked on the coast of Jutland. She was on a voyage from Stockholm to London, Great Britain.
Catherine	Great Britain	The ship was wrecked on the Welsh coast. She was on a voyage from Wales to Poole, Dorset.
Conference	Great Britain	The ship was driven ashore near Bridlington, Yorkshire. She was on a voyage from Newcastle upon Tyne, Northumberland to London.
Edward and Jane	Great Britain	The ship was lost at Málaga, Spain. She was on a voyage from Málaga to London.
Elizabeth and Ann	Great Britain	The ship was wrecked near Workington, Cumberland. She was on a voyage from Liverpool, Lancashire to Naples, Kingdom of Sicily.
Expedition	Great Britain	The ship was driven ashore on Texel, North Holland, Batavian Republic.
Fortuna	Sweden	The ship was lost near Bornholm, Denmark. She was on a voyage from Stockholm to Plymouth, Devon, Great Britain.
Hibberts	Great Britain	The ship was driven ashore on Scattery Island, County Clare, Ireland. She was on a voyage from Jamaica to London. She was refloated and proceeded to London.
Hope	Great Britain	The ship was lost near Lytham St Annes, Lancashire. She was on a voyage from Jamaica to Liverpool.
Jane	Great Britain	The ship was run down and sunk in the North Sea off Sunderland, County Durham. She was on a voyage from Hull, Yorkshire to Maryport, Cumberland.
John	Hamburg	The transport ship was wrecked on Scroby Sands. Her crew were rescued.
Lydia	Great Britain	The ship was driven ashore and wrecked near Kirkcudbright. She was on a voyage from Saint Petersburg to Liverpool.
Mary	Ireland	The ship was wrecked on the Welsh coast while on a voyage from Liverpool to Galway.
Phyllis	Great Britain	The ship was wrecked near the Burin Peninsula, Newfoundland, British North America with some loss of life.
Minerva	Ireland	War of the First Coalition: The transport ship was captured and sunk by the French. She was on a voyage from Limerick to Cartagena, Spain.
Neptunus	Russia	The ship was lost near Varberg, Sweden. She was on a voyage from Saint Petersburg to Málaga.
Peggy	Great Britain	The ship caught fire off Gibraltar and was scuttled. She was on a voyage from Livorno, Grand Duchy of Tuscany to London.
Triad	Great Britain	The ship was wrecked near Cromer, Norfolk. She was on a voyage from Saint Petersburg to Plymouth.
Vengeur	Great Britain	War of the First Coalition: The privateer was captured in the Irish Sea by a British privateer. She subsequently foundered with the loss of all hands.
Von Hemmert	Denmark	The ship was driven ashore and wrecked near Chichester, Sussex, Great Britain whilst on a voyage from Santa Cruz to Copenhagen.
Welcome	Great Britain	The ship was wrecked on the Sandhammer. She was on a voyage from Saint Petersburg to Hull.
Zeelilee	Dutch East India Company	The East Indiaman was wrecked in the Isles of Scilly, Great Britain with the loss of 25 of the 70 people on board. Survivors were rescued by HMS Indefatigable ( (Kingdom of Great Britain) Royal Navy). Zeelilee was on a voyage from Limerick. Ireland to London.

== November ==
=== 2 November ===
List of shipwrecks: 2 November 1795
Ship	State	Description
Hawke	Great Britain	War of the First Coalition: The ship was captured and sunk in the Atlantic Ocean by a French frigate.
Hope	Great Britain	The ship departed from Plymouth, Devon for "Isle Dieu". No further trace, presumed captured.

=== 3 November ===
List of shipwrecks: 3 November 1795
Ship	State	Description
Jarratt	Great Britain	The transport ship was wrecked on the coast of Holland. Her crew were rescued. She was on a voyage from London to the Weser.

=== 6 November ===
List of shipwrecks: 6 November 1795
Ship	State	Description
Betsey	Great Britain	The ship was driven ashore on the east Kent coast.
Phoenix	Great Britain	The ship foundered in The Downs with the loss of two of her crew. She was on a voyage from London to Southampton, Hampshire.
Polly	Great Britain	The ship was lost on this date. She was on a voyage from London to Naples, Kingdom of Sicily.

=== 8 November ===
List of shipwrecks: 8 November 1795
Ship	State	Description
Joseph	Great Britain	The snow foundered in the North Sea off Harwich, Essex while on a voyage from Saint Petersburg, Russia to London. Her crew were rescued by a fishing smack.

=== 11 November ===
List of shipwrecks: 11 November 1795
Ship	State	Description
Two Brothers	Great Britain	The ship departed from Cork, Ireland for London. No further trace, presumed foundered with the loss of all hands.

=== 18 November ===
List of shipwrecks: 18 November 1795
Ship	State	Description
Aeolus	Great Britain	The transport ship was wrecked on Chesil Beach, Dorset, or was driven ashore at Portland, Dorset with the loss of ten of her crew.
Catherine	Great Britain	The transport ship was wrecked on Chesil Beach, or at Portland with the loss of all but two of those on board.
Eikenboom	Batavian Republic	The ship was driven into a Portuguese ship, then driven ashore and wrecked in the Cattewater. Her crew survived.
Golden Grove	Great Britain	The ship was wrecked on Chesil Beach. The ship was driven ashore and wrecked at Portland. She was on a voyage from London to Saint Kitts.
Hannah	Great Britain	The transport ship was lost off Chesil Beach, or was driven ashore about 4 nautical miles (7.4 km) from Weymouth, Dorset.
Piedmont	Great Britain	The ship was wrecked on Chesil Beach, or was wrecked at Portland, with the loss of over 100 lives. There were only ten survivors.
Thomas	Great Britain	The ship was wrecked on Chesil Beach.
Venus	Great Britain	The transport ship was wrecked on Chesil Beach, or at Portland. There were only eleven survivors.
Six unnamed vessels	Flags unknown	The transport ships were driven ashore in the Cattewater and were severely damaged.

=== 21 November ===
List of shipwrecks: 21 November 1795
Ship	State	Description
Bee	Great Britain	The ship was wrecked on Langues Point, Isle of Man with the loss of all hands.

=== 22 November ===
List of shipwrecks: 22 November 1795
Ship	State	Description
Mary Maria	Great Britain	War of the First Coalition: The ship was captured off Whitby, Yorkshire by the privateer Vengeance (France) and was burnt.

=== Unknown date ===
List of shipwrecks: Unknown date in November 1795
Ship	State	Description
Amity	Great Britain	The ship was wrecked on the coast of France. She was on a voyage from Liverpool, Lancashire to London.
Ann	Great Britain	The ship caught fire and was beached in Studland Bay, where she was wrecked. She was on a voyage from South Shields, County Durham to Livorno, Grand Duchy of Tuscany.
Anna Maria	Great Britain	The ship was lost near Milford, Pembrokeshire with the loss of three of her crew. She was on a voyage from London to Barmouth, Carnarvonshire.
Ann and Eliza	Great Britain	The ship was lost off the mouth of the Algoa River. She was on a voyage from Bengal, India to the Cape of Good Hope.
Aurora	Great Britain	The transport ship was driven ashore and severely damaged at Barbican, Plymouth, Devon.
Belfast	Great Britain	The ship was driven ashore and wrecked in Carnarvon Bay. She was on a voyage from Liverpool to Limerick, Ireland.
Benson	Great Britain	The ship was wrecked on the Sandhammer Reef. She was on a voyage from Saint Petersburg, Russia to London.
Betsey	Great Britain	The ship was driven ashore and wrecked at Portsmouth, Hampshire. She was on a voyage from London to Jamaica.
Blessing	Great Britain	The ship ran aground on The Shingles, Isle of Wight. She was on a voyage from Newcastle upon Tyne, Northumberland to Plymouth, Devon.
Britannia	Great Britain	The transport ship was driven ashore and severely damaged at Portsmouth. Her crew were rescued.
Britannia	Great Britain	The ship was lost at Fayal Island, Azores. She was on a voyage from Lisbon, Portugal to Newfoundland, British America.
Britton	Great Britain	The ship was driven ashore near Portsmouth. She was on a voyage from Hull, Yorkshire to Bilbao, Spain.
Canterberry	Great Britain	The collier was driven ashore near Calais, France.
Ceres	Great Britain	The ship was wrecked near Boulogne, Pas-de-Calais, France. Her crew were rescued. She was on a voyage from Jamaica to London.
Charmilly	Great Britain	The ship was run into by an Imperial Russian Navy frigate and was severely damaged. She was on a voyage from London to the Elbe. She put in to Sheerness, Kent.
Cleopatria	Great Britain	The transport ship was driven ashore near Calais. She was on a voyage from "Bremerlee" to Portsmouth.
Commerce	Great Britain	The transport ship was driven ashore and severely damaged at Portsmouth. Her crew were rescued.
Commerce	Great Britain	The ship was lost in the Baltic. She was on a voyage from Saint Petersburg to Liverpool.
Dispatch	Great Britain	The ship was driven ashore and wrecked near Stockton-on-Tees, County Durham. She was on a voyage from London to South Shields.
Dobrey Uspeck	Stettin	The ship was driven ashore on Bornholm, Denmark. She was on a voyage from Stettin to Saint Petersburg.
Eliza	United States	The ship was lost on the French coast.
Elizabeth	Great Britain	The ship was lost in the Baltic. She was on a voyage from Saint Petersburg to Grangemouth, Stirlingshire.
Elizabeth & Clare	Great Britain	The ship was wrecked on the Welsh coast. She was on a voyage from Teignmouth, Devon to Liverpool.
Emeraton	Sweden	The ship was wrecked on the south coast of the Isle of Wight. Her crew were rescued. She was on a voyage from "Ivica" to Gothenburg.
Fame	Ireland	The ship was lost in the Sound of Mull. She was on a voyage from Arkhangelsk, Russia to Newry, County Antrim.
Flaxton	Great Britain	The ship was driven ashore near Kronstadt, Russia. She was on a voyage from Saint Petersburg to Hull.
HMS Fleche	(Kingdom of Great Britain) Royal Navy	The corvette foundered in the Mediterranean Sea off Saint-Florent, Corsica, France.
Friends	Ireland	The ship was wrecked on the Isle of Mull, Inner Hebrides, Great Britain. She was on a voyage from Belfast, County Antrim to St. Ubes, Portugal.
Generous Friends	Great Britain	The sloop foundered in the North Sea off the Flamborough Head, Yorkshire while on a voyage from Sunderland, County Durham to Bridlington, Yorkshire.
Gloriana	Hamburg	The ship was driven ashore at Portsmouth.
Hannah	Ireland	The ship was driven ashore near "Elsingburg". She was on a voyage from Saint Petersburg to Limerick.
Hoffnung	Stettin	The ship was lost in Norway. She was on a voyage from London to Stettin.
Hope	Great Britain	The ship was lost near St Mary's, Isles of Scilly. She was on a voyage from Jamaica to London.
Hope	Great Britain	The ship foundered off Helstone, Cornwall. She was on a voyage from Bristol, Gloucestershire to Portsmouth.
Hope	United States	The ship was lost on the French coast. She was on a voyage from Maryland to Holland.
John	Great Britain	The ship was driven ashore in Mount's Bay. She was on a voyage from London to Gibraltar.
John and Daniel	Great Britain	The ship was driven ashore and wrecked at Herne Bay, Kent.
Joseph	Great Britain	The ship was lost near Harwich, Essex. Her crew were rescued. She was on a voyage from Saint Petersburg to London.
Lady Fitzgibbon	Great Britain	The ship was lost whilst on a voyage from Parkgate, Cheshire to Dublin, Ireland. Her crew were rescued.
Louisa	Great Britain	The ship was lost in the Baltic. She was on a voyage from London to Stettin.
Lovely Lass	Great Britain	The ship was lost on the coast of Holland.
Lucy	Great Britain	The ship was driven ashore at Newhaven, Sussex. She was on a voyage from Dublin to London.
Maria	Great Britain	The full-rigged ship was wrecked on the Gunfleet Sand, in the North Sea off the coast of Essex. Her crew were rescued.
Maria	Great Britain	The ship was lost in the Baltic. She was on a voyage from London to Memel, Prussia.
Maria Carolina	Hamburg	The transport ship was wrecked at Spithead, Hampshire.
Maria Dorothea	Stettin	The ship was lost in the Baltic. She was on a voyage from Bordeaux, Gironde, France to Stettin.
Mary	Great Britain	The ship was wrecked at Rame Head, Cornwall. She was on a voyage from Liverpool to Plymouth.
Nancy	Ireland	The ship was driven ashore and wrecked at Brighton, Sussex, Great Britain. She was on a voyage from Limerick to London.
Nancy	Great Britain	The ship foundered in The Downs. She was on a voyage from Swansea, Glamorgan to Ramsgate and London.
Nautilus	Great Britain	The ship was wrecked on Öland, Sweden. She was on a voyage from Stockholm, Sweden to Ipswich, Suffolk.
Neptunus	(Denmark) Norway	The ship was driven ashore at Broadstairs, Kent, Great Britain. She was on a voyage from Amsterdam, North Holland, Batavian Republic to Fredericksburg.
Neutralyte	Great Britain	The ship was lost on the coast of Cumberland. Her crew were rescued.
New Blessing	Great Britain	The ship was lost at Memel.
Newcastle	Great Britain	The ship was driven ashore and wrecked on the coast of Jutland. She was on a voyage from Leith, Lothian to Hamburg.
Nostra Señora de Los de Lores	Spain	The ship foundered in the Bristol Channel with the loss of all hands. She was on a voyage from Bristol to Bilbao.
Phœnix	Great Britain	The ship foundered in The Downs. She was on a voyage from London to Southampton, Hampshire.
Plato	Great Britain	The ship was lost at Memel.
Plus Vel Minus	Danzig	The ship was lost in the Baltic. She was on a voyage from Plymouth to Danzig.
Pond	Great Britain	The ship was driven ashore at Waterford, Ireland. She was on a voyage from Porto, Portugal to Newfoundland.
Princess Maria Carolina	Hamburg	The ship was driven ashore at Portsmouth.
Princess of Wales	Great Britain	The ship was driven ashore and sank near Fort Monckton, Hampshire. She was on a voyage from London to the West Indies.
Providence	Great Britain	The brig was wrecked on the Gunfleet Sand. Her crew were rescued.
Queenhithe	Great Britain	The ship was wrecked on Öland. She was on a voyage from Stockholm to London.
Ranger	Great Britain	The ship was driven ashore on the Isle of Man. She was on a voyage from Liverpool to Jamaica.
Rose	Great Britain	The ship was lost in St Brides Bay. She was on a voyage from London to Lancaster, Lancashire.
Samuel & Fanny	Great Britain	The ship was driven ashore and wrecked on the Isle of Man. She was on a voyage from Liverpool to New Providence, New Jersey, United States.
Sarah	Great Britain	The transport ship was driven ashore and severely damaged at Barbican, Plymouth.
Speculator	Great Britain	The ship foundered in Chichester Harbour.
St Juan Baptista	Spain	The ship was driven ashore and severely damaged at Plymouth. She was on a voyage from Bordeaux, Gironde, France to Plymouth.
Success	Great Britain	The ship was driven ashore in Filey Bay.
Thomas	Great Britain	The ship was driven ashore near Ramsgate, Kent. She was on a voyage from London to Weymouth.
Tortola Packet	Great Britain	The ship was lost at Viana do Castelo, Portugal. Her crew were rescued. She was on a voyage from Newfoundland to Viana do Castelo.
Traveller	Great Britain	The ship was driven ashore in Plymouth Sound. She was on a voyage from Plymouth to "Bremerlee".
William Pitt	Great Britain	The transport ship was abandoned off St Alban's Head, Dorset. Her crew were rescued. She subsequently came ashore near Poole, Dorset.
Zoorg	Dutch East India Company	The East Indiaman was wrecked near Boulogne. Her crew were rescued. She was on a voyage from Plymouth to London.

== December ==
=== 10 December ===
List of shipwrecks: 10 December 1795
Ship	State	Description
Concord	Great Britain	The ship was wrecked in the Atlantic Ocean with the loss of all but two of her crew. They were rescued on 19 December at 48°46′N 11°14′W by Thomas and Mary (Great Britain). Concord was on a voyage from Porto, Portugal to London.

=== 12 December ===
List of shipwrecks: 12 December 1795
Ship	State	Description
Commerce	Great Britain	HMS Leander ( (Kingdom of Great Britain) Royal Navy ran down the stores ship in the Atlantic Ocean 40 leagues (120 nautical miles (220 km)) west of Ouessant, Finistère, France, sinking her with the loss of one of her thirteen crew.
HMS Etrusco	Royal Navy	The ship was in distress 50 nautical miles (93 km) west of Cape Clear Island, County Clare, Ireland. Her masts were cut away and most of her guns were jettisoned. She was taken in tow the next day by an American vessel, which took her in to Milford Haven, Pembrokeshire.

=== 14 December ===
List of shipwrecks: 14 December 1795
Ship	State	Description
Nelly	Great Britain	The sloop was driven ashore and wrecked at Sinclair's Bay, Caithness while on a voyage from the Shetland Islands to Leith, Lothian. Three of her crew were lost.

=== 18 December ===
List of shipwrecks: 18 December 1795
Ship	State	Description
Katty	Ireland	The ship foundered in the Irish Sea off Scattery Island, County Clare whilst on a voyage from imerick to Liverpool, Lancashire, Great Britain.
Martha and Ann	Ireland	The ship foundered in the Irish Sea off Scattery Island whilst on a voyage from Limerick to Dublin.

=== 19 December ===
List of shipwrecks: 19 December 1795
Ship	State	Description
HMS Caesar	Royal Navy	The third rate ran aground on the Owers Sandbank, in the English Channel off the coast of Sussex. She was refloated and taken in to Portsmouth, Hampshire.
HMS London	Royal Navy	The London-class ship of the line ran aground on the Owers Sandbank. She was refloated and taken in to Portsmouth.
Oporto Merchant	Great Britain	The ship was wrecked on the Cross Sand, in the North Sea off Great Yarmouth, Norfolk. Her crew tool to the longboat; they were rescued by Volunteer (Great Britain). Oporto Merchant was on a voyage from Málaga, Spain to Southampton, Hampshire and Hull, Yorkshire.
Two unnamed vessels	Flags unknown	The ships were wrecked on the coast of Ross-shire, Great Britain with the loss of all hands.

=== 22 December ===
List of shipwrecks: 22 December 1795
Ship	State	Description
Elizabeth and Sarah	Great Britain	The brig was wrecked at Milford Haven, Pembrokeshire with the loss of all hands.

=== 29 December ===
List of shipwrecks: 29 December 1795
Ship	State	Description
Mary	Great Britain	The ship was wrecked on the Isle of Lewis. She was on a voyage from Pärnu, Russia to Liverpool, Lancashire.

=== 30 December ===
List of shipwrecks: 30 December 1795
Ship	State	Description
HMS Amethyst	(Kingdom of Great Britain) Royal Navy	The frigate was wrecked in the English Channel off Alderney.

=== Unknown date ===
List of shipwrecks: Unknown date in December 1795
Ship	State	Description
Abby	Great Britain	The ship was driven ashore near Holyhead, Anglesey. She was on a voyage from Dublin, Ireland to Liverpool, Lancashire.
Adventure	Great Britain	The ship foundered in the North Sea off "Huntcliff". She was on a voyage from Newcastle upon Tyne to Maldon, Essex.
Ann	United States	The ship was driven ashore near Emden, Hanover. She was on a voyage from Baltimore, Maryland to Amsterdam, North Holland, Batavian Republic.
Ann	Ireland	The ship was wrecked on the coast of Spain while on a voyage from Dublin to Lisbon, Portugal.
Bellona	Great Britain	The ship was lost on the Wicklow Banks, in the Irish Sea. She was on a voyage from Liverpool to Limerick, Ireland.
Birmingham	Great Britain	The ship foundered while on a voyage from La Rochelle, Charente-Maritime, France to Rotterdam, South Holland, Batavian Republic.
Bon Visage	Portugal	The ship was lost in Killbaha Bay with the loss of fourteen of her crew. She was on a voyage from St. Ubes to Limerick.
Charles	Great Britain	The abandoned ship was discovered by HMS Dido (Royal Navy). She was taken in to Gibraltar.
De Christiana Maria	Hanover	The ship was driven ashore on the coast of Holland. She was on a voyage from London, Great Britain to Emden.
Der Grief	Sweden	The ship was driven ashore and wrecked at Elsinore, Denmark. She was on a voyage from Kalmar to Amsterdam.
Elizabeth	Great Britain	The ship was driven ashore and wrecked on the coast of Argyllshire. She was on a voyage from Jamaica to Havana, Cuba and Greenock, Renfrewshire.
Gottenburg Merchant	Sweden	The ship was driven ashore and wrecked at Elsinore. She was on a voyage from Riga, Russia to Leith, Lothian, Great Britain.
George	Great Britain	The ship was driven ashore near Liverpool. She was on a voyage from Liverpool to Baltimore, Maryland, United States.
Grape	Great Britain	The ship was wrecked at Beerhaven, County Cork, Ireland with the loss of six of her crew. She was on a voyage from Lisbon, Portugal to Liverpool, Lancashire.
Hannah	United States	The ship foundered off the Isle de France.
Hercules	Great Britain	The ship was driven ashore near Falmouth, Cornwall. She was on a voyage from New York, United States to London.
Hooks and Lines	Ireland	The ship was wrecked on the Irish coast with the loss of all but one of those on board. She was on a voyage from Newfoundland, British America to Waterford.
Hull Packet	Great Britain	The ship was driven ashore in the Humber. She was on a voyage from Porto, Portugal to Hull, Yorkshire.
Idalia	Great Britain	The transport ship ran aground on the Cockle Sand, in the North Sea off Great Yarmouth, Norfolk and was wrecked. Her crew were rescued.
Isabella	Great Britain	The ship collided with a man-of-war at Helsingør, Denmark and was severely damaged. She was on a voyage from Danzig to London.
Jarrett	Great Britain	The ship foundered in the North Sea. Her crew were rescued.
John and Hannah	Great Britain	The ship foundered in the Baltic Sea off Kronstadt, Russia. She was on a voyage from London to Saint Petersburg, Russia.
Laurentius	Denmark	The ship was lost near Gothenburg. She was on a voyage Copenhagen to Saint Croix.
London	Great Britain	The ship was wrecked on Scroby Sands, Norfolk. Her crew were rescued. She was on a voyage from Carron, Stirlingshire to London.
Mary	Great Britain	The ship foundered in the Atlantic Ocean while on a voyage from Liverpool to New York. Her crew were rescued by Harriot (Great Britain).
Mary	Great Britain	The ship foundeed off Rame Head, Cornwall. She was on a voyage from Liverpool to Plymouth, Devon.
Minerva	Great Britain	The ship was wrecked on Gotland, Sweden. She was on a voyage from Saint Petersburg to London.
Minerva	Great Britain	The ship was wrecked on Helbra Island, at the mouth of the River Dee. Her crew were rescued. she was on a voyage from New York to Liverpool.
Nelly and Kitty	Great Britain	The ship was driven ashore near Calais, France She was on a voyage from St. Ubes to Ostend, Lys, France.
Neptune	Great Britain	The ship was wrecked on the coast of Jutland. She was on a voyage from Stockholm, Sweden to Plymouth, Devon.
Neptune	Great Britain	The ship caught fire and sank in the North Sea. Her crew were rescued.
Peace	Great Britain	The ship was driven ashore at Chichester, Sussex. She was on a voyage from Charleston, South Carolina, United States to London.
Peggy	Great Britain	The ship struck the pier at Liverpool and sank. She was on a voyage from Saint Petersburg to Liverpool. Peggy was later refloated.
Perseverance	Great Britain	The ship foundered in the Atlantic Ocean while on a voyage from Liverpool to Boston, Massachusetts, United States. Her crew were rescued by Jane (Great Britain).
Providence	Ireland	The ship was driven ashore near Køge, Denmark. She was on a voyage from Riga to Dublin.
Rhoda	Great Britain	The ship was wrecked on Gotland, Sweden whilst on a voyage from Narva, Estonia to Hull.
Rosina	Great Britain	The ship was destroyed by fire off Great Yarmouth. She was on a voyage from Memel, Prussia to London.
Schwalbe	Stettin	The ship was lost at Skagen, Denmark. She was on a voyage from Great Yarmouth to Stettin.
Semkallet	Sweden	The ship was lost near Ostend, Lys, France.
Swallow	Great Britain	The ship was wrecked on the Knock Sand in the North Sea. Her crew were rescued.
Thomas	Flag unknown	The ship was wrecked in the Treshnish Isles, Inner Hebrides, Great Britain with the loss of all hands. She was on a voyage from Salem, Massachusetts, United States to Belfast, County Antrim, Ireland.
Twee Gysberts	Hamburg	The ship was lost near Calais.
Urania	Prussia	The ship was driven ashore near Libava, Courland Governorate. She was on a voyage from Dysart, Fife to Memel.
Unnamed	Flag unknown	The transport ship ran aground on the Barber Sand, in the North Sea off the coast of Norfolk. Her crew were rescued.

== Unknown date ==
List of shipwrecks: Unknown date in 1795
Ship	State	Description
Active	Great Britain	War of the First Coalition: The ship was captured by Jean Bart (French Navy) and was sunk. She was on a voyage from Bristol, Gloucestershire to Jamaica.
Alice	Great Britain	War of the First Coalition: The ship was captured by the French while on a voyage from Barbados to Liverpool, Lancashire. She subsequently foundered off Brest. Finistère, France.
Ann	Great Britain	The ship foundered in the Atlantic Ocean whilst on a voyage from Virginia, United States to Jamaica. Her crew were rescued.
Apollo	United States	The ship was driven ashore at Sandy Hook, New Jersey. She was on a voyage from Hamburg to New York.
Ashley	Great Britain	War of the First Coalition: The ship was captured and sunk off Saint Vincent by the French.
Benjamin	Great Britain	War of the First Coalition: The ship was captured and destroyed off Angola by a squadron of French ships.
Betsey	Bremen	The ship was abandoned in the Atlantic Ocean (26°30′N 72°00′W). Her crew were rescued by Jason (Great Britain). Betsey was on a voyage from Bremen to Charleston, South Carolina, United States.
Betsey	Great Britain	War of the First Coalition: The ship was captured by the French off Barbados and was sunk. She was on a voyage from London to Saint-Domingue.
Betsey and Brother	Ireland	War of the First Coalition. The ship was captured and burnt by Ranger (French Navy). She was on a voyage from Norfolk, Virginia, United States to Dublin.
Brothers	Great Britain	War of the First Coalition: The ship was captured and burnt by a squadron of French Navy ships.
Brothers	Great Britain	War of the First Coalition: The ship was captured by a squadron of French ships at Bonny, Nigeria and was destroyed.
Bell	Great Britain	The ship run aground on a rock off Bermuda while on a voyage from British Honduras to London. She was subsequently condemned as beyond repair.
Chacer	Great Britain	The ship was wrecked in Honduras Bay while on a voyage from British Honduras to London.
Clarissa	Great Britain	The ship was lost on Nantucket Island, Massachusetts, United States. Her crew were rescued. She was on a voyage from Liverpool to Boston, Massachusetts.
Cleveland	United States	The ship was driven ashore in the Chesapeake River. She was on a voyage from the West Indies to America.
Commerce	Great Britain	War of the First Coalition: The ship was captured and sunk by the French.
Count de Hiega	Flag unknown	The ship was lost on "Juagua". She was on a voyage from Saint-Marc, Saint-Domingue to Baltimore, Maryland, United States.
Devonshire	Great Britain	The ship was lost at Jamaica. She was on a voyage from Jamaica to London.
Dictator	United States	The schooner was wrecked on Long Island, New York. She was on a voyage from New Providence, New Jersey to Grand Cayman.
Earl of Eglington	Great Britain	War of the First Coalition: The ship was captured and sunk by a French squadron. She was on a voyage from the Clyde to the West Indies.
Elizabeth	Great Britain	War of the First Coalition: The ship was captured by the French and sunk while on a voyage from Dublin to Cádiz, Spain.
Fort William	Great Britain	The ship was destroyed by fire at Jamaica. She was on a voyage from Jamaica to London.
George & Mary	Great Britain	The ship was driven ashore whilst on a voyage from Liverpool to Quebec, Lower Canada, British America.
Giupulcua	Spain	War of the First Coalition: The ship was captured and destroyed off Angola by a squadron of French ships.
Hambro Packet	United States	The ship was driven ashore and severely damaged. She was on a voyage from Philadelphia, Pennsylvania, to Hamburg.
Hankey	Great Britain	The ship sank at Port Antonio, Jamaica. Her crew were rescued She was on a voyage from Jamaica to London.
Hannah	United States	The ship was lost at the Île de France, Mauritius.
Happy Return	Great Britain	The brig foundered in the Atlantic Ocean while on a voyage from Jamaica to Charleston, South Carolina. Her crew were rescued.
Harmony	Great Britain	The transport ship was dismasted and abandoned. Her crew were rescued by 'Elizabeth (Great Britain). Harmony was on a voyage from Jamaica to London.
Hebe	Great Britain	The ship was wrecked off Tortola, Virgin Islands before 2 June. She was on a voyage from Cork or Dublin to Jamaica.
Henry	Great Britain	War of the First Coalition: The ship was captured and sunk in the Atlantic Ocean by the French. She was on a voyage from Liverpool to Quebec.
Hooks Ark (or Noah's Ark)	(Great Britain)	The ship was wrecked on The Martyrs while on a voyage from New Orleans, Louisiana, New Spain, to Philadelphia, Pennsylvania, United States.
Hope	Great Britain	War of the First Coalition: The ship was captured and burnt by a squadron of French Navy ships.
Hope	Great Britain	War of the First Coalition: The ship was captured and burnt by the privateer Mother Mitchell (Flag unknown). She was on a voyage from New Providence, New Jersey, United States to the West Indies.
Industry	Great Britain	The ship was lost off Cape Ann, Massachusetts with the loss of all hands. She was on a voyage from Portsmouth, Hampshire to Boston, Massachusetts.
Jeanette	Hamburg	The ship was wrecked in Barbuda. She was on a voyage from Altona to Saint Thomas, Virgin Islands.
Jemima	Great Britain	War of the First Coalition: The ship was captured and sunk by the French. She was on a voyage from Jamaica to London.
John	Great Britain	War of the First Coalition: The ship was captured in the Atlantic Ocean by a French squadron and was burnt. She was on a voyage from Liverpool to Africa.
Jonge Gerard & Louize	Batavian Republic	War of the First Coalition The ship was captured by the French and burnt. She was on a voyage from Rotterdam, South Holland to Surnam.
Jonge Wuysenburg	Batavian Republic	War of the First Coalition): The ship was captured by Tribune (French Navy) and burnt. She was on a voyage from Cádiz, Spain to Amsterdam, North Holland.
Julius	Great Britain	War of the First Coalition: The ship was captured and destroyed off Angola by a squadron of French ships.
Kitty	Great Britain	The ship was lost in the Windward Passage. Her crew were rescued by Eagle (Great Britain). Kitty was on a voyage from Jamaica to London.
Liberty	France	War of the First Coalition: The privateer was sunk off Saint Thomas by HMS Alarm ( (Kingdom of Great Britain) Royal Navy).
Liveley	Great Britain	The ship was captured and sunk by La Torterelle (French Navy).
Margaret	United States	The ship was lost off Cape Ann, Massachusetts. She was on a voyage from Amsterdam to Boston.
Mars	United States	The ship was driven ashore in Delaware Bay. She was on a voyage from Saint Petersburg to Philadelphia.
Mary	Great Britain	War of the First Coalition: The ship was driven ashore at Annamaboe, Africa by a French squadron and was wrecked.
Mary	Great Britain	War of the First Coalition: The ship was captured and destroyed off Angola by a squadron of French ships.
Mary	Great Britain	War of the First Coalition: The ship was captured off Jamaica by a privateer and was burnt.
Mary	Great Britain	The ship foundered in the Atlantic Ocean. Her crew were rescued by Harriot (Great Britain). Mary was on a voyage from Liverpool to New York.
Mercury	Great Britain	The ship foundered in the West Indies. Her crew were rescued by a frigate. She was on a voyage from Martinique to London.
Minerva	Great Britain	The ship was run down and sunk in the Windward Passage by HMS Intrepid ( (Kingdom of Great Britain) Royal Navy). Her crew were rescued. She was on a voyage from Jamaica to Liverpool, Lancashire.
Minerva	Portugal	The ship sprang a leak and was abandoned. Her crew were rescued. She was on a voyage from Baltimore, Maryland, United States to Lisbon.
Minerva	Great Britain	The ship ran aground off Bermuda and was wrecked. Her crew were rescued. She was on a voyage from Norfolk to Tobago.
Miriam	Great Britain	The ship was lost whilst on a voyage from Jamaica to New Brunswick, British America. Her crew were rescued.
Nancy	Great Britain	War of the First Coalition: The ship was captured by the French while on a voyage from Porto to Liverpool. She subsequently foundered.
Nancy	Great Britain	The ship foundered whilst on a voyage from Martinique to Newfoundland, British America.
Nancy	United States	The ship was wrecked off Bermuda. She was on a voyage from Philadelphia to Jamaica.
Neptune	Great Britain	The ship was driven ashore south of Long Island, New York, United States. She was on a voyage from Dominica to New York.
Peggy	Great Britain	War of the First Coalition: The ship was captured and destroyed off Angola by a squadron of French ships.
Perseverance	Great Britain	The ship was wrecked on the north coast of Anegada, Virgin Islands before 28 August. She was on a voyage from Tobago and Grenada to London.
Phillis	Great Britain	The ship was lost near Halifax, Nova Scotia, British America with the loss of a crew member. She was on a voyage from Lisbon to Halifax.
Phillis	Great Britain	The ship was lost in the Grand Banks of Newfoundland She was on a voyage from London to Quebec.
Pomona	Great Britain	War of the First Coalition The ship was captured and sunk off Saint Vincent by the French.
Porcupine	Great Britain	War of the First Coalition: The ship was captured and burnt by the French. She was on a voyage from Nova Scotia to Antigua.
Robert	Great Britain	War of the First Coalition: The ship was captured by Musette (French Navy) and was burnt. She was on a voyage from Dominica to Georgia, United States.
Robert Morris	Great Britain	The ship was driven ashore at the Cape of Good Hope, Cape Colony.
Rosina	Great Britain	War of the First Coalition: The ship was captured and sunk by the French.
Sally	United States	The ship foundered while on a voyage from Virginia to Londonderry, Ireland. Her crew were rescued.
Sally and Polly	Great Britain	The ship foundered while on a voyage from Savannah, Georgia, United States to Bremen. Her crew were rescued after 13 days in a boat.
Sarah	Great Britain	The transport ship was abandoned. Her 34 passengers and crew were rescued by Prince Edward (Great Britain).
Sprightly	Great Britain	The brig was captured and sunk by the La Torterelle (French Navy).
Squid	Great Britain	War of the First Coalition: The ship was captured and burnt by a squadron of French Navy ships.
St Esperita Anlapaz	Spain	War of the First Coalition: The ship was captured and sunk by the French.
Swift	Great Britain	War of the First Coalition: The ship was captured and destroyed off Angola by a squadron of French ships.
Tankerville Packet	Great Britain	War of the First Coalition: The ship was captured in the Atlantic Ocean (24°N 60°W) by a French Brig-of-War. She was burnt. Tankerville Packet was on a voyage from Falmouth, Cornwall to Halifax.
Three Brothers	Great Britain	The ship foundered in the West Indies. Her crew were rescued by a frigate.
Toms	Great Britain	War of the First Coalition: The ship was captured and destroyed off Angola by a squadron of French ships.
Union	Great Britain	The ship was driven ashore at Sandy Hook, New Jersey. She was on a voyage from Liverpool to New York.
Union	Great Britain	War of the First Coalition: The ship was captured and destroyed off Angola by a squadron of French ships.
Venus	Great Britain	War of the First Coalition: The ship was captured and destroyed off Angola by a squadron of French ships.
William	Great Britain	War of the First Coalition: The ship was captured and burnt by a squadron of French Navy ships.
William	Great Britain	War of the First Coalition: The ship was captured and sunk by a French squadron. She was on a voyage from the Clyde to the West Indies.
William	Great Britain	The ship foundered in the Atlantic Ocean. Her crew survived. She was on a voyage from Poole, Dorset to Philadelphia or Newfoundland.
William the Conqueror	Great Britain	War of the First Coalition: The ship was driven ashore at Annamaboe by a squadron of French ships and was wrecked.
York	Great Britain	The ship was driven ashore at Cape Negro, Nova Scotia, British America. She was on a voyage from Liverpool to Boston, Massachusetts.
