= French ship Sans Pareil =

Seven ships of the French Navy have borne the name Sans Pareil (Translated as "Peerless" or "Unequalled"):

- French ship Sans Pareil (1669), a 62-gun ship of the line, wrecked in 1679.
- French ship Sans Pareil (1685), a 50-gun ship of the line, removed from lists in 1698.
- French ship Sans Pareil (1695), a 42-gun ship.
- French ship Sans Pareil (1779), was the British privateer cutter Non Such, of 18 guns and 77 men, that Concorde captured in November 1779. The French Navy bought her for lt26,949, rearmed her at Brest, and took her into was service as Sans Pareil. On 15 June 1780 the British frigates Phoenix, Lowestoffe, and Pomona captured her as she was sailing from Martinique to Cap-Français. At the time of her capture she was armed with 16 guns and had a crew of 100 men. Her owner was described as the "King of France". The Royal Navy did not take her into service but instead consigned her to Robinson & Co., at Jamaica.
- French ship Sans Pareil (1793), an 80-gun Tonnant-class ship of the line, captured in 1794 during the battle of the Glorious First of June and taken into service as HMS Sans Pareil. She was hulked in 1810 and broken up in 1842.
- French ship Sans Pareil (1812), a 116-gun ship better known as Roi de Rome, was ordered as Sans Pareil. She was never launched and was broken up on keel.
- French ship Sans Pareil (1939), an airplane tender.

The female flexion Sans Pareille was also used for smaller ships:

- French corvette Sans Pareille (1798) was a privateer that the French navy purchased on the stocks and took into service as a 20-gun corvette. HMS Mercury captured her on 20 January 1801 and the Royal Navy took her into service as HMS Delight, but sold her in April 1805.
- French ship Sans Pareille (1801), a 20-gun ship, captured in 1801.

== See also ==
- Sans-Pareil-class ship of the line (Note: No ship of the type was effectively built, but a large model is now on display at the Musée national de la Marine in Paris.)
