= Golden Grove (1793 ship) =

Slave ship

History

Great Britain
- Name: Golden Grove
- Owner: 1794: Richard Miles, Jerome Bernard Weuves; 1796:Wood
- Builder: Southampton
- Launched: 1783
- Fate: Wrecked November 1795

General characteristics
- Tons burthen: 284 (bm)
- Sail plan: Full-rigged ship
- Crew: 32
- Armament: 16 × 6-pounder guns + 4 swivel guns

Golden Grove was launched at Southampton in 1783, but probably under another name. In 1794 she was a slave ship in the triangular trade in enslaved people. Under new ownership she wrecked in late 1795. Her loss gave rise to case on insurance still quoted at least some 70 years later.

== Career ==
Although Golden Grove was launched in 1783, she does not appear in Lloyd's Register until 1793. At that time her master was Proudfoot, her owner was (Richard) Miles, and her trade was London–Africa.

Captain John Mead Proudfoot received a letter of marque on 8 October 1793. Golden Grove left London on 7 November 1793, bound for the Bight of Benin. In 1793, 68 British vessels sailed from British ports on voyages to transport enslaved people.

On 12 December Golden Grove was "all well" and under convoy of the sloop HMS Bulldog at 34°34′N 16°4′W, i.e., about 100 miles NNE of Madeira. Proudfood commenced acquiring captives on 18 January 1794. Proudfoot acquired them at Cape Coast Castle, Anomabu, and Popo. Golden Grove sailed from Africa on 14 April, and arrived at Kingston, Jamaica, on 5 June. She had embarked 416 captives and she arrived with 415, having suffered only one captive death en route, an astonishingly low death toll for the route. She arrived back in England on 3 October. (Note: After the passage of Dolben's Act, masters received a bonus of £100 for a mortality rate of under 2%; the ship's surgeon received £50. For a mortality rate between two and three per cent, the bonus was halved. There was no bonus if mortality exceeded 3%.)

Lloyd's Register for 1796 shows Golden Grove's master changing from Proudfoot to "W. H_dg__n", her owner to Wood, and her trade to London—"StK__ts".

== Fate ==
A Golden Grove was wrecked on 18 November 1795 at Chesil Beach, Dorset. Lloyd's List reported on 20 November that Golden Grove, Hodzard, master, was wrecked on Portland Beach on her way to St Kitts, and that very little of her cargo was saved. (Golden Grove is no longer listed in Lloyd's Register in 1796.)

Golden Grove was one of seven vessels wrecked in the same storm. At the time, Golden Grove and at least five of the other vessels that were wrecked were part of Admiral Christian's fleet that was sailing to capture islands in the West Indies. The British fleet did not leave Spithead until 16 November; two days after departing, a westerly gale blew up, dispersing the fleet and driving the ships back to port. Several of the merchantmen, Golden Grove among them, were wrecked with heavy loss of life; over 200 bodies were washed up on the coastline between Portland and Bridport.

The mate, and some passengers and members of Golden Gate's crew survived.

The expeditionary force finally sailed between mid-February and mid-March. In May–June the British succeeded in capturing St Lucia, Saint Vincent, and Grenada.

Court case: The loss of Golden Grove gave rise to a court case over her insurance, a case that was still quoted some at least 70 years later. When she was wrecked, one of the underwriters paid £284 5s. When the underwriter discovered that she had sailed without receiving her sailing instructions, he sued for the return of the payment on the grounds that she had not legally joined the convoy when it sailed. Golden Grove had left Portsmouth and arrived at the rendezvous while the convoy was under weigh. However, her master did not arrive until some hours later, and so did not receive the sailing instructions until the next day, vitiating the policy, which required that she sail in convoy. The jury found for the underwriter.
