= Greyhound (ship) =

Several vessels have been named Greyhound for the greyhound:

== Greyhound (1747 ship) ==
Greyhound was a coastal trading vessel launched in Whitby in 1747 or possibly before that was wrecked in a storm off the coast of County Sligo on 12 December 1770.

== Greyhound (1791 ship) ==
Greyhound was a smack of 74 tons (bm), launched at Dover in 1784, possibly under another name. In 1791, Dudman & Co. purchased her. (Note: Dudman & Co. were major shipbuilders, working for a time with the shipbuilder William Barnard. Between 1785 and 1794, they owned three ships that operated in the British southern whale fishery. They had not built these vessels, but rather had purchased interests in vessels built in America, Britain (Greyhound), and France (Lucy).) Greyhound first appeared in Lloyd's Register (LR) in 1792 with A. Crow, master, Dudman, owner, and voyage London–Southern Fishery. She had been raised in 1791.

Sealing voyage (1791–1793): Captain A.Crow sailed from London on 12 November 1791, bound for Cape Verde. Greyhound arrived back at Falmouth on 28 April 1793. She had worked off Patagonia and she returned with five tuns of whale oil and 20,000 seal skins.

West Indiaman: Lloyd's Register for 1794 showed Greyhound's master changing from A.Crow to P. Smith, her owner from Dudman to Skey, and her voyage from London–Southern Fishery to London–Jamaica. Lloyd's Register for 1796 showed her master changing from P. Smith to N. Todd, and her owner from Skey to W.Bryan. In January 1796 Greyhound, Todd, master, arrived at Cork from Honduras, having sustained some damage.

Loss: On 18 May 1796 Greyhound, Todd, master, sailed from Gravesend for Jamaica. Lloyd's List reported on 3 June that Greyhound, Tod, master, was onshore and bilged off Portsmouth. Greyhound was last listed in Lloyd's Register in the volume for 1796.

== Greyhound (1816 ship) ==
Greyhound was launched at Java in 1816. She burnt in 1821.

== Greyhound (1890 sternwheeler) ==
Greyhound was an express passenger steamer that operated from the 1890s to about 1915 on Puget Sound in Washington, United States.

== See also ==
- HMS Greyhound, any one of 16 vessels that served the English or Royal Navy
- USS Greyhound, any one of at least three vessels of the United States Navy
