= French ship Royal Louis (1759) =

Ship of the line of the French Navy

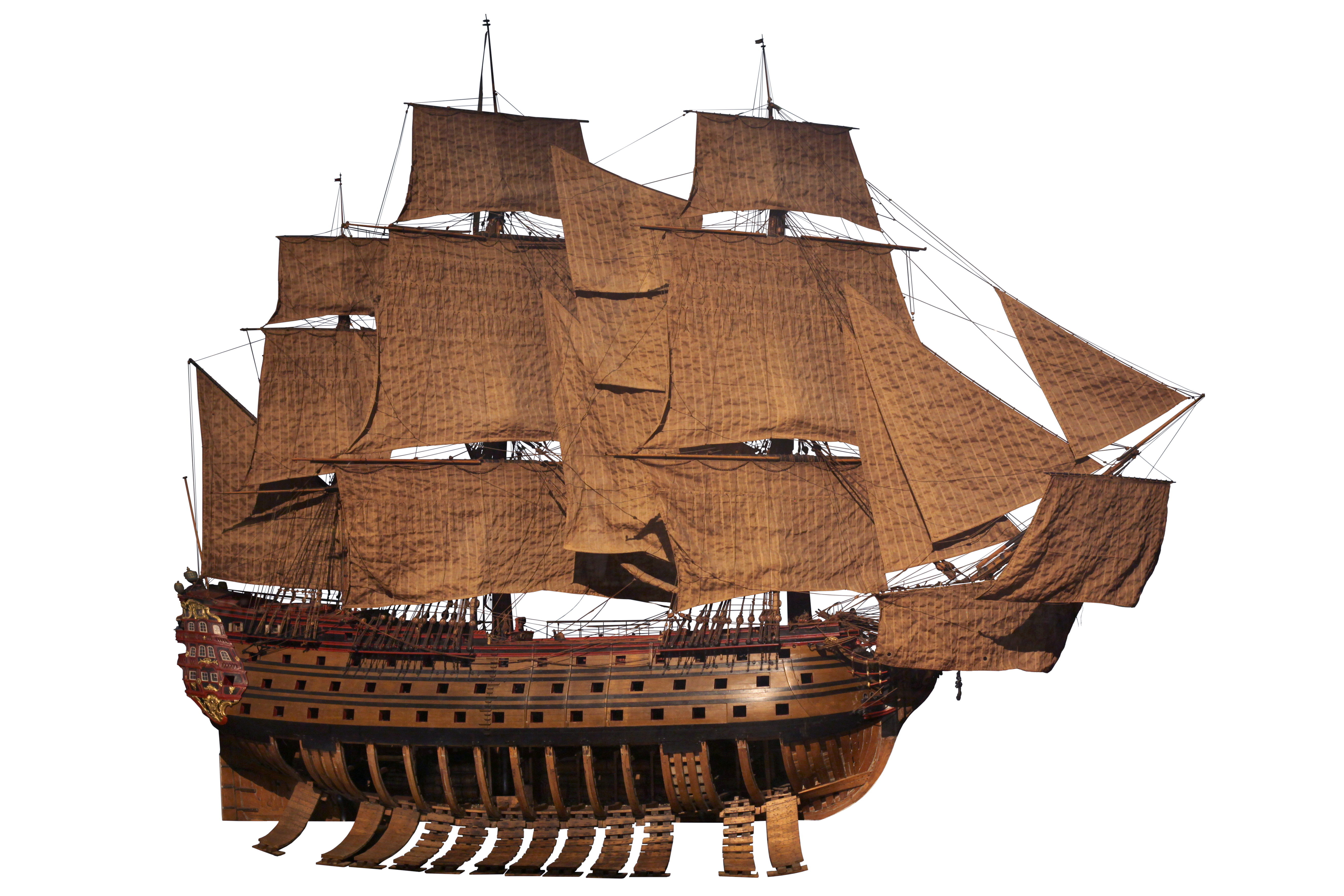
- Model of the fictitious ship Sans-Pareil that defined the type of Royal Louis

History

France
- Namesake: Louis XV of France
- Ordered: 29 May 1757
- Builder: Brest Dockyard
- Laid down: June 1757
- Launched: May 1759
- Completed: July 1762
- Stricken: 1772
- Fate: Broken up in 1773

General characteristics
- Class & type: First Rank ship of the line
- Displacement: 4732 tonneaux
- Tons burthen: 3000 port tonneaux
- Length: 190 French feet (Note: The French (pre-metric) foot was 6.575% longer than the equivalent British foot.)
- Beam: 51½ French feet (16.73 m)
- Draught: 25 French feet 8 inches
- Depth of hold: 24½ French feet
- Decks: 3 gun decks
- Sail plan: Full-rigged ship
- Complement: 1,320, + 18 officers
- Armament: 116 guns: Main battery: 32 × 36-pounders on the lower deck; Secondary battery: 34 × 24-pounders on the middle deck; Upper battery: 34 × 12-pounders on the upper deck; Forecastle and quarterdeck: 16 × 8-pounders on the quarterdeck and forecastle
- Armour: timber

Royal Louis was a 116-gun ship of the line of the Royal French Navy, designed in 1757 by Jacques-Luc Coulomb and constructed in 1757 to 1762 by Laurent Coulomb at Brest Dockyard. She was the fourth ship to bear the name, and the only ship of the Sans-Pareil design ever built.

== History ==
In August 1771, when in dry dock, she was found to have deteriorated beyond repair and was eventually demolished in 1773, without having seen any service.

== Legacy ==
A 1/18 scale model on display at the Musée national de la Marine in Paris, MnM 13 MG 32, is thought to represent Royal Louis.

Model MnM 13 MG 32 at the Musée national de la Marine
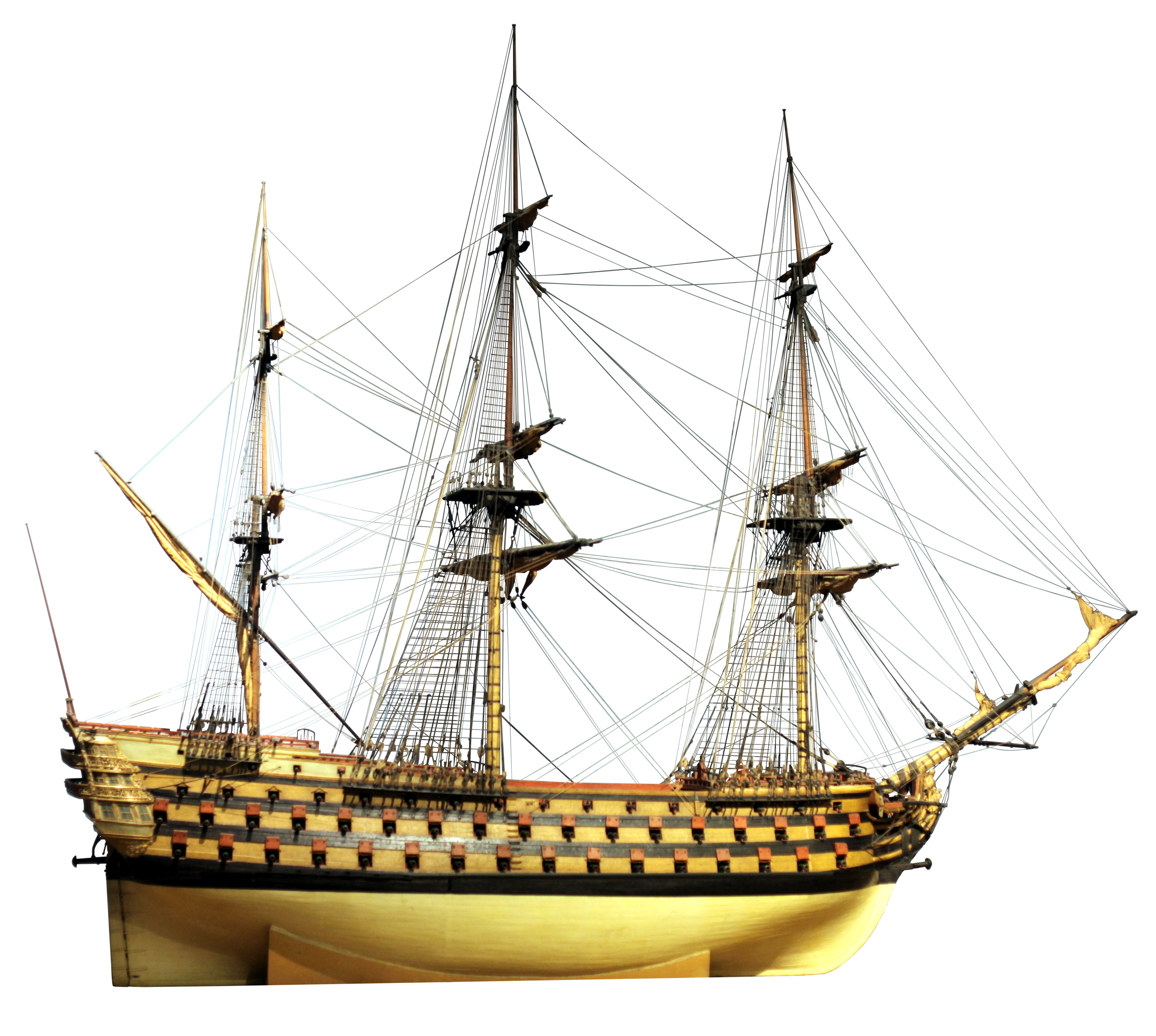

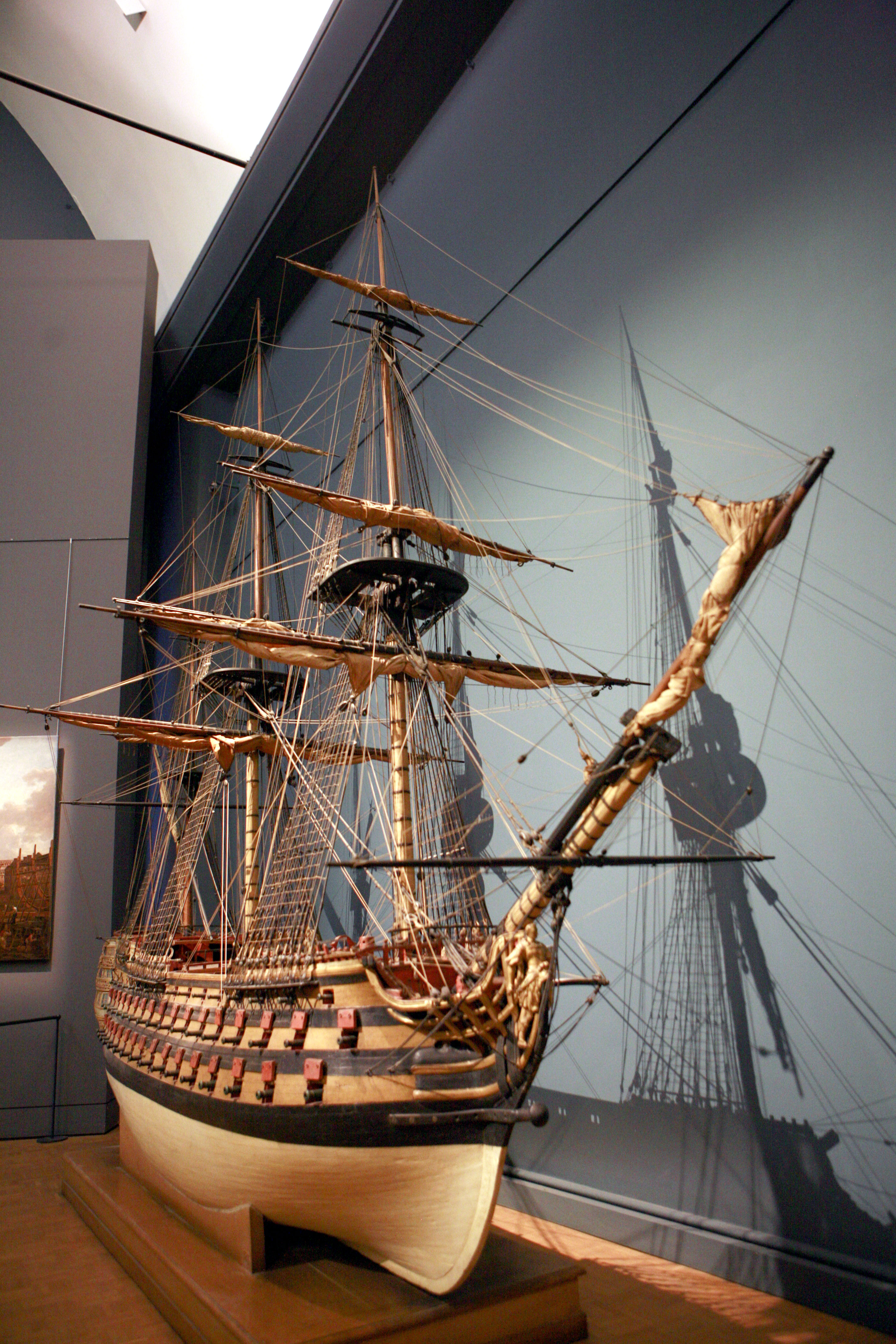

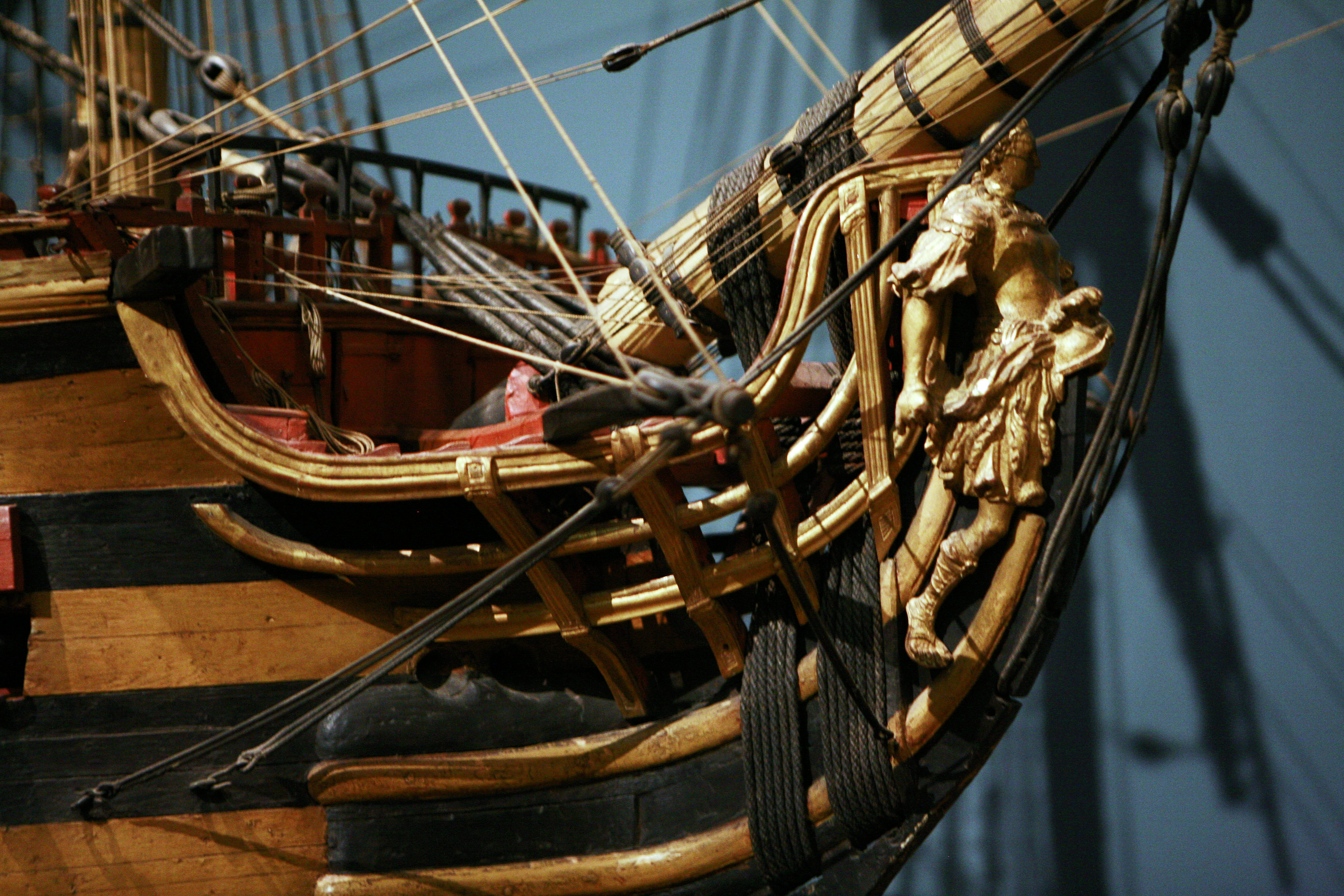

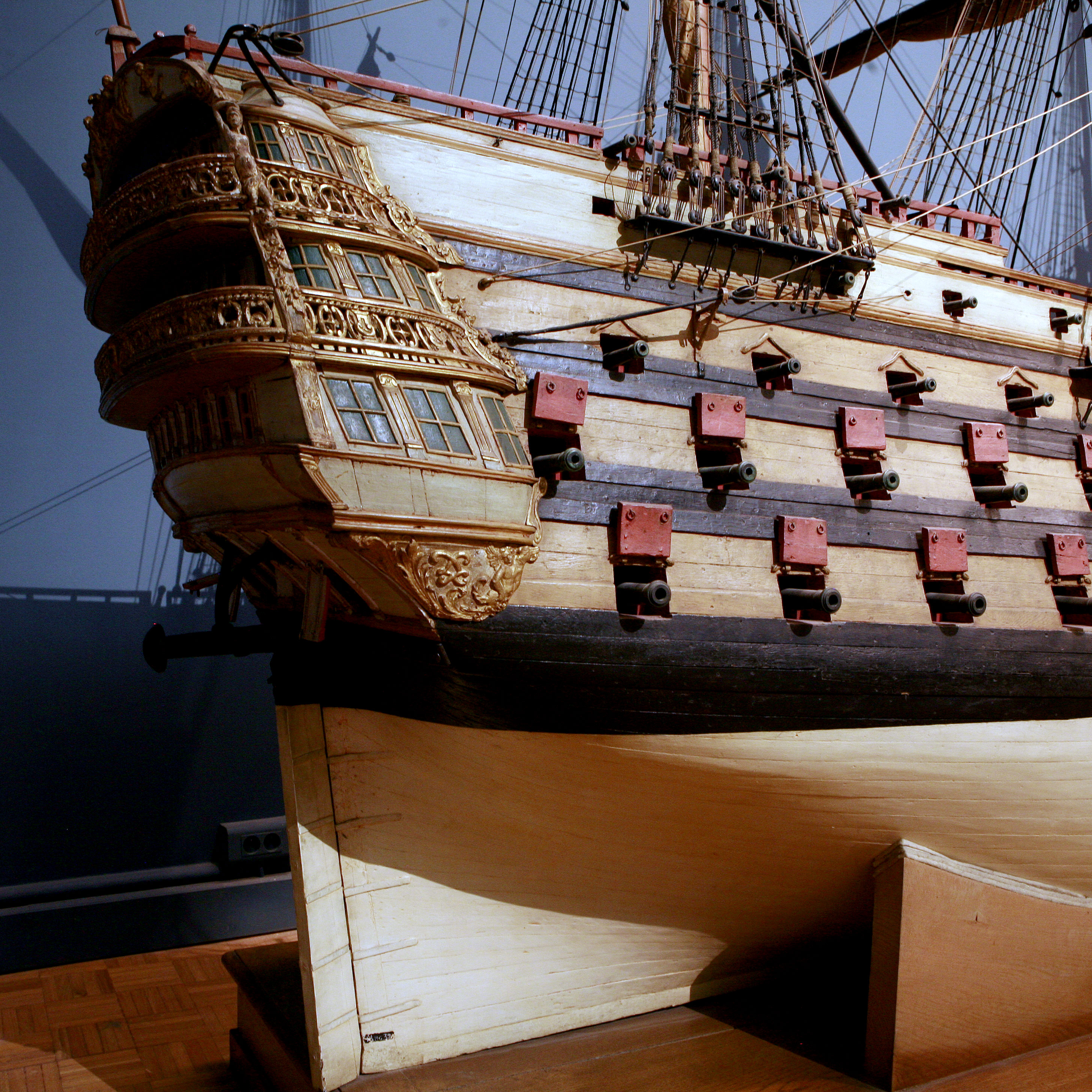
