= Hugh Cloberry Christian =

Royal Navy officer (1747–1798)

Rear-Admiral Sir Hugh Cloberry Christian KB
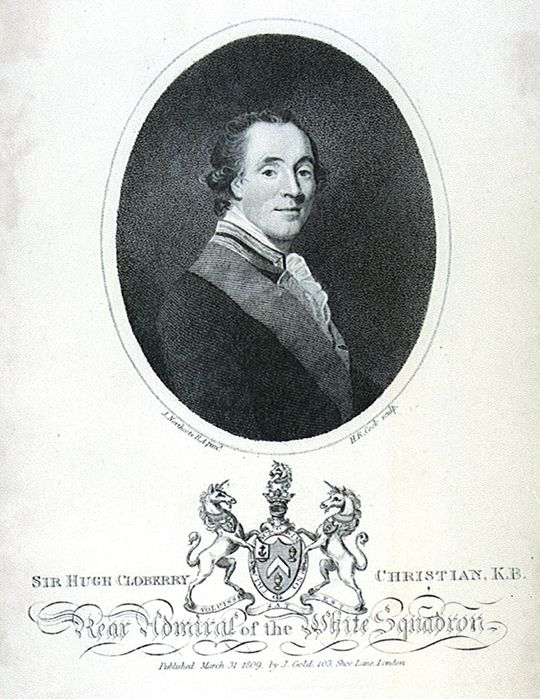
- Born: 1747; Hook Norton, Oxfordshire, England
- Died: 23 November 1798 (aged 50–51); Cape of Good Hope, Cape Colony
- Military career
- Allegiance: Kingdom of Great Britain
- Branch: Royal Navy
- Service years: 1761–1798
- Rank: Rear-Admiral of the White
- Commands: HMS Suffolk; HMS Fortunee; HMS Queen Charlotte; Leeward Islands Station; Cape of Good Hope Station
- Conflicts: American Revolutionary War; Battle of Grenada; Battle of Martinique; Battle of the Chesapeake; Battle of St. Kitts; Battle of the Saintes; French Revolutionary Wars
- Awards: Knight Companion of the Order of the Bath

Rear-Admiral of the White Sir Hugh Cloberry Christian, KB (1747 – 23 November 1798) was a Royal Navy officer who served in the American War of Independence and the French Revolutionary Wars. Details of his early life are obscure, but he appears to have served initially in the English Channel and the Mediterranean, before obtaining the rank of captain and going out to North America with Commodore Joshua Rowley. Christian was Rowley's flag-captain on HMS Suffolk for several years, and saw action in several of the naval engagements of the American War of Independence.

Returning to Britain at the end of the war, he spent a period without active employment, before receiving a post as second captain aboard Lord Howe's flagship, the 100-gun HMS Queen Charlotte, during the Nootka Crisis. He temporarily left her when the crisis abated, but the outbreak of the French Revolutionary Wars led to his return to Queen Charlotte. Christian stepped down from her in 1794 to join the Transport Board, and in 1795 was promoted to rear-admiral.

He was made commander-in-chief in the Leeward Islands Station and given the task of transporting a large troop convoy. Twice he attempted the crossing of the Atlantic, and twice he was forced back by severe gales which ravaged his fleet and wrecked a number of the merchant ships in the convoy. He made a third attempt in 1796, and succeeded in shepherding the fleet to its destination. He was then active in using the troops and his naval forces to capture the islands of Saint Lucia, Saint Vincent and Grenada, before returning to England. He was made second in command at the Cape of Good Hope in 1797, succeeding to commander-in-chief the following year, and he died while in command there in November 1798.

== Family and early life ==
Christian, descended from residents of the Isle of Man, was born at Hook Norton, Oxfordshire, in 1747. His father, Thomas Christian, was a captain with his own privateer, whilst his mother, Anne Penny was a poet. He followed his father into the navy in 1761, spending time in the English Channel and the Mediterranean, but few details of his early service survive, other than that he took his lieutenant's examination in 1767, and received his commission on 21 January 1771. He married Ann Leigh, resident of the Isle of Wight on 6 March 1775, and was promoted to master and commander in 1778.

== American War of Independence ==
Christian received a further promotion to flag-captain on 8 December 1778 and took command of the 74-gun HMS Suffolk, flying the broad pennant of Commodore Joshua Rowley. Rowley sailed from Spithead on 25 December in command of a squadron of seven ships of the line, which was part of the fleet under the overall command of Lord Shuldham escorting the trade convoys to the colonies. Rowley and the Suffolk were assigned to the West Indies-bound convoy. The Suffolk arrived in the Leeward Islands on 12 February 1779, and Christian remained with Rowley in the West Indies, serving with Vice-Admiral John Byron at the Battle of Grenada on 6 July 1779. Christian led the van of the British attack, and the Suffolk lost seven killed and 25 wounded. Byron returned to England after this, being replaced by Rear-Admiral Hyde Parker, with Rowley retaining Suffolk as his flagship. Towards the end of 1779 intelligence reached Parker that three French ships had been sighted from Morne Fortune, sailing northward. Parker sent Rowley to intercept them, and after chasing them for several hours, all three were captured. They were revealed to be the 42-gun Fortunée, the 36-gun Blanche and the 28-gun Ellis, with all three being added to the Royal Navy.

Christian was again in action on 18 December, helping to capture and destroy a large French convoy off Martinique, and took part in the engagements off Martinique under Admiral George Rodney in April 1780. Over the three engagements that took place, Suffolk lost one man killed, and 33 wounded. Rowley shifted his flag to the 74-gun HMS Conqueror after these clashes, and Christian was transferred to command the 38-gun HMS Fortunee, the frigate he had helped to capture in 1779. He was present at the Battle of the Chesapeake on 5 September 1781, after which he returned to the West Indies. He and Fortunee formed part of Sir Samuel Hood's fleet, with Christian being present at the Battle of St. Kitts on 25 and 26 January 1782, attached to the centre division. He was still with Rodney's fleet when the Battle of the Saintes was fought against the Comte de Grasse on 9 to 12 April 1782.

== End of the war ==
Christian sailed north from Jamaica on 21 July 1782 with Admiral Hugh Pigot's fleet, arriving at New York City on 5 September. Returning to Port Royal with Hood's fleet in February the following year, he spent several months cruising in the area. He returned to England with Hood in April 1783, and left active service following the end of the war with the signing of the Treaty of Paris. He presumably did not receive any further employment until the 1790 Nootka Crisis, when he is recorded as being appointed as second captain aboard Lord Howe's flagship, the 100-gun HMS Queen Charlotte. The easing of tensions meant that Queen Charlotte was paid off at the end of the year, and Christian again found himself without a ship.

== French Revolutionary Wars ==
The outbreak of the French Revolutionary Wars in early 1793 provided Christian with further employment. Queen Charlotte was recommissioned, and he again became her second captain, still under Lord Howe. He stepped down from his post in August the following year, becoming a commissioner of the Transport Board, and on 1 June 1795 he was advanced to rear-admiral of the blue. He was then appointed commander-in-chief of the Leeward Islands Station in 1796, and was instructed to take a fleet out with a convoy of transports, carrying soldiers for operations against the French and Dutch colonies there. He duly hoisted his flag aboard the 98-gun HMS Prince George and assembled his squadron and the transports, numbering over two hundred merchants carrying 16,000 men, and making up the largest troop convoy to leave England to that date.

=== Attempts to cross the Atlantic ===
The fleet did not leave Spithead until 16 November, the departure having been delayed until late in the season. The delay proved disastrous: two days after departing, a westerly gale blew up, dispersing the fleet and driving the ships back to port. Several of the merchantmen were wrecked with heavy loss of life; over 200 bodies washed up on the coastline between Portland and Bridport.

Christian shifted his flag to the 90-gun HMS Glory, after deeming the Prince George to be too badly damaged to take to sea, and after gathering his fleet again, set sail on another attempt to cross the Atlantic on 9 December. Again the ships encountered severe gales that caused considerable damage, forcing nine of the warships and fifty of the merchantmen to struggle back to port on 29 January. Some of the convoy successfully made the crossing, while others were wrecked, or captured by enemy ships. The storms were afterwards alluded to as 'Christian's Gales'. Christian again shifted his flag, this time to the 74-gun HMS Thunderer, while he waited for repairs to his ships to be completed, and the merchantmen gathered to make a third attempt to reach the West Indies. While ashore he was invested as a Knight Companion of the Order of the Bath on 17 February 1796, and on 20 March he left Spithead again, bound for the West Indies. The third voyage was successful, and he arrived at Carlisle Bay, Barbados on 21 April. He joined with the forces of the station's current commander, Sir John Laforey several days later, and took over the command from him. Christian assembled his forces, and on 26 April sailed to invade St Lucia, with a detachment of troops under Lieutenant-General Sir Ralph Abercromby. The invasion was successful and the island was surrendered to the British on 25 May. Christian went on to use his naval forces to support the reduction and capture of the islands of Saint Vincent and Grenada.

== Later years ==
Christian was succeeded as commander in the West Indies by Rear-Admiral Henry Harvey, who had arrived in late June, and Christian returned to England in October aboard HMS Beaulieu. He was advanced to rear-admiral of the white on 20 February 1797, and was appointed as second in command of the Cape of Good Hope Station later in the year and duly sailed to take up the post on the 44-gun HMS Virginie. He succeeded Admiral Thomas Pringle as the station commander in 1798, but died on 23 November that year at the age of 51. His wife, who had been seriously ill for sometime, died two months later, without having heard of her husband's death. Hugh Cloberry Christian had been created a peer, and chose the title of Lord Ronaldsway to honour his ancestor, Manx politician Illiam Dhone, but died before the patent reached him. He was buried at the Cape. He and his wife had two sons and three daughters; one son, Hood Hanway Christian, became a Rear Admiral.

== Notes ==
Military offices
Preceded by Sir John Laforey	Commander-in-Chief, Leeward Islands Station; 1796	Succeeded by Henry Harvey
Preceded by Thomas Pringle	Commander-in-Chief, Cape of Good Hope Station; 1798	Succeeded by Sir Roger Curtis
