= Hope (1792 ship) =

History

Great Britain
- Name: Hope
- Launched: 1792, Plymouth
- Fate: Sold 1794

Spain
- Name: Esperanza
- Namesake: Hope
- Acquired: 1794 by purchase
- Fate: Last listed 1796

General characteristics
- Tons burthen: 251, or 257 (bm)
- Complement: 34
- Armament: 1793: 8 × 6-pounder guns; 1794: 12 × 4-pounder guns

Hope was launched in 1792 at Plymouth. In 1793 she had a successful cruise as a privateer, capturing or recapturing about five vessels. On her return to England, her owners sold her and she became the Spanish packet Esperanza, sailing between England and Spain. With the outbreak of war between Britain and Spain in 1796, Esperanza disappeared from the registers.

== Career ==
Hope first appeared in Lloyd's Register in 1793.

Year	Master	Owner	Trade	Source
1793	S.Roscow	G.Glenny	London–Africa	LR

Although Hope's trade was London–Africa, she was not a slave ship. She apparently became a privateer. Captain Samuel "Roscon" acquired a letter of marque on 28 February 1793.

Lloyd's List reported in March 1793 that Hope, Roscow, master, had captured Generoux, of 200 tons, which had been sailing from Toulon to Brest with a cargo of wine, etc. Hope also recaptured Rover, Adey, master, of Poole, which had been sailing from Malaga to London.

In August 1793 Lloyd's List reported that Rover, of London, Roscof, master, had captured five French Guineamen and was taking them to the West Indies. One of them, of 400 tons and quite new, was believed to be named Mirabeau. Another of the captured vessels was Egalite. Hope had captured Egalite and Mirabeau on the coast of Africa. In January 1794, Hope returned to London from Barbados.

The ship named Hope then disappeared from Lloyd's List. However, the 1794 volume for Lloyd's List showed a ship called Esperanza (Spanish for "hope"), of 251 tons (bm), launched at Plymouth in 1792. In 1796, war broke out between Britain and Spain. Esperanza was last listed in the 1796 volume of Lloyd's Register.

Year	Master	Owner	Trade	Source
1794	Doinizio		Spanish packet	LR
