= Lucy (ship) =

Several ships have been named Lucy.

== Lucy (1787 ship) ==
- Lucy was possibly built in France. She came into British ownership and Lucy first appeared in Lloyd's Register LR) in 1787. Lucy was of 280, or 300 tons (bm). Her owners were Dudman & Co. (Note: Dudman & Co. were major shipbuilders, working for a time with the shipbuilder William Barnard. Between 1785 and 1794, they owned three ships that operated in the British southern whale fishery. They had not built these vessels, but rather had purchased interests in vessels built in America, Britain (Greyhound), and France (Lucy).'"`UNIQ--ref-00000000-QINU`"') Lucy made three voyages between 1787 and 1791 as a whaler in the British southern whale fishery. 1st whaling voyage (1787–1789?): Captain W. Bunker sailed from London on 20 September 1787. He returned with 40 tuns of sperm oil, 10 tuns of whale oil, and eight cwt of whale bone. 2nd whaling voyage (1789–1790): Captain William Dyer sailed from London on 2 July 1789 for the Brazil Banks and Africa. He returned on 17 September 1790. Lucy was included on the Protection List for 1790. 3rd whaling voyage (1791–1792): As Lucy, Burchett, master, was on her way from London to the southern fishery, she was reported on 4 March 1791 to have run on shore near Sheerness. She was expected to be got off. On 25 May Lucy, Bain, master, sailed from the Downs for the southern fishery. On 3 February 1792, Lucy, Bayne, master, was at the Cape of Good Hope, together with Spy, Chaser, and several other whalers. Lucy, Barnes, master, returned to London on 1 November 1792. She then became a merchantman, or possibly a government transport. War with France broke out in early 1793. James Bain, as master of Lucy, acquired a letter of marque on 31 August 1793. Although by one report Lucy was a whaler in 1793–1794, the ship arrival and departure data in Lloyd's List does not support this. Instead, she made at least one voyage to Barbados, possibly sailing as a government transport. Lucy was last listed in 1794. In October 1796 Lloyd's List reported that a French privateer had captured the transport Lucy as Lucy was coming from Jamaica and took her into Havre. Unfortunately, there is too little information to determine whether the captured Lucy was the Lucy of the present article.

== Lucy (1799 ship) ==
- Lucy (1799 ship) was a Spanish vessel built in 1789, probably under another name. She came into British ownership in 1799. As Lucy, she proceeded to make three complete voyages as a slave ship in the triangular trade in enslaved people. One the second of these she rather unusually assisted the British commander at Gorée in an operation to destroy a Spanish vessel at Senegal before the French could arm it as a privateer. However, a few days later a revolt by her captives resulted in the death of Lucy's captain. The French captured Lucy in 1806 on her fourth enslaving voyage as she was approaching the West Indies after she had embarked her captives. Her captors took Lucy into Guadeloupe, together with the captives she was carrying.

== Lucy (1804 ship) ==
- Lucy (1804 ship) was launched at Liverpool in 1804. She made two complete voyages as a slave ship before the Slave Trade Act 1807 ended British participation in the triangular trade in enslaved people.
