= Rover (1786 ship) =

18th century ship of Great Britain

History

Great Britain
- Name: Rover
- Launched: 1786, Poole
- Fate: Wrecked in 1795

General characteristics
- Tons burthen: 139 (bm)

Rover was launched in 1786 in Poole. She spent her brief career sailing to Newfoundland from England, and returning via Spain, having delivered fish (probably salt cod). In 1793 a French privateer captured her, but a British letter of marque quickly recaptured her. She was lost in 1795 while delivering fish from Newfoundland to Spain.

== Career ==
Rover first appeared in Lloyd's List (LR) in 1786.

Year	Master	Owner	Trade	Source
1786	Thomas Adey	Carter & Co.	Portsmouth–Newfoundland	LR

Lloyd's List reported in March 1793 that the British privateer Hope, Roscow, master, had captured Generoux, of 200 tons, which had been sailing from Toulon to Brest with a cargo of wine, etc. Hope also recaptured Rover, Adey, master, of Poole, which had been sailing from Malaga to London. After her recapture, Rover went into Lisbon.

Year	Master	Owner	Trade	Source
1795	T. Adey	Carter & Co.	London–Newfoundland	LR

== Loss ==
Lloyd's List reported in January 1795 that Rover, Adey, master, had been coming from Newfoundland when she was totally lost in Cadiz Bay. Her crew were saved. She had been carrying a cargo of fish.
