= Sans-Pareil-class ship of the line =

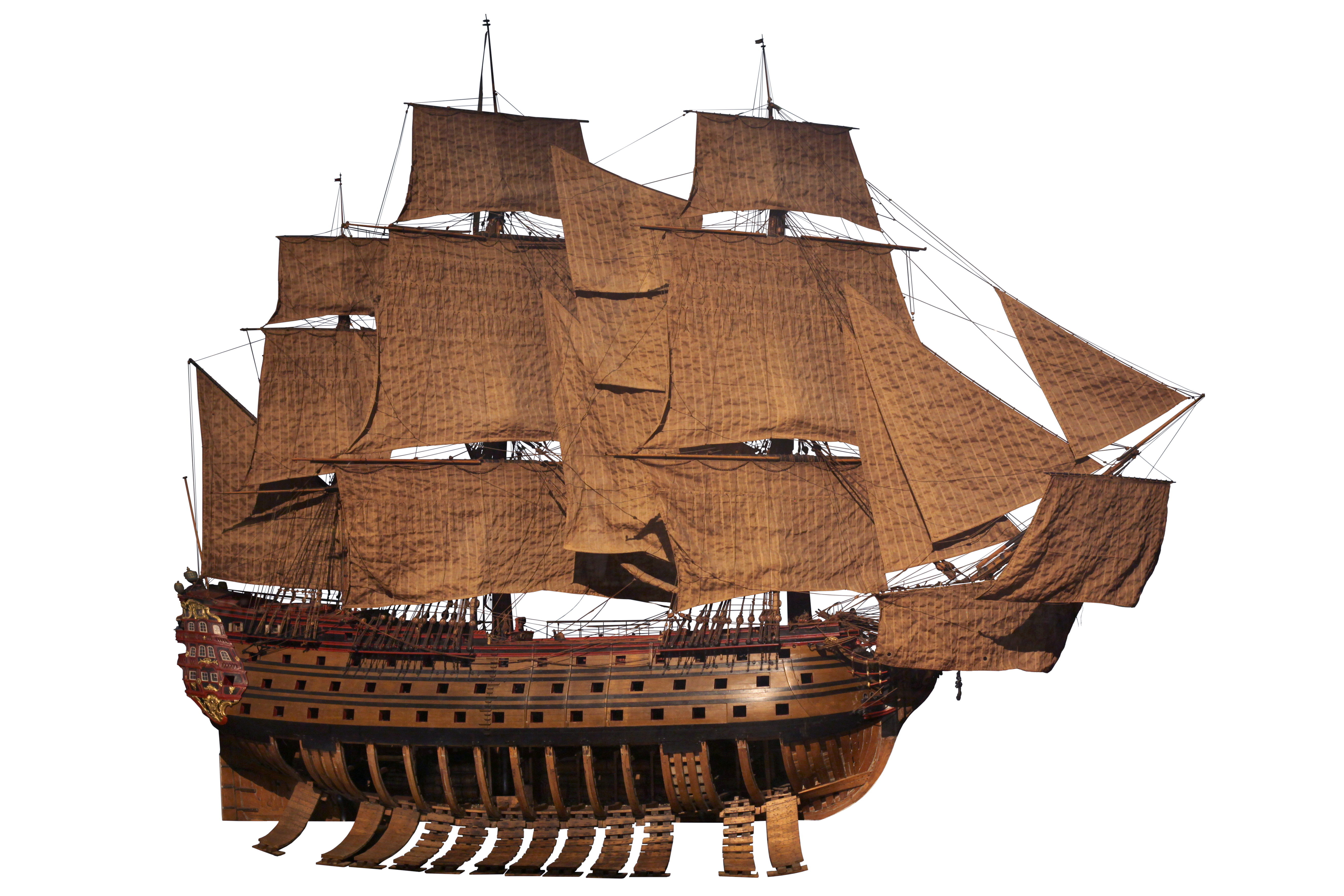
- 1/28.8th model of Sans Pareil now kept at the Musée de la Marine in Paris

Class overview
- Name: Sans Pareil
- Operators: French Navy
- Planned: Océan, Médiateur, Majestueux, Indomptable
- Completed: 1

General characteristics
- Type: Ship of the line
- Displacement: 4732 tonneaux
- Tons burthen: 3000 port tonneaux
- Armament: 116 guns

Sans Pareil ("Peerless") was a ship of the line project presented to Louis XV between 1757 and 1760. No actual ship of this type bore the name in the French Navy, though Royal Louis was built on the scheme.

== Design ==
Sans Pareil was a project to build a series of ships taking into account new improvements in ship design. The name was suggested twice to Louis XV; in 1751, the king preferred Océan, and in 1757, Royal Louis, Médiateur, Majestueux, and Indomptable. Only Royal Louis was actually built; due to the huge costs of construction, the three others were replaced with smaller-sized ships of the line.

Sans Pareil only existed as a 1/1/30th model which is now kept at the Musée de la Marine in Paris. It is very likely to offer only very minor differences to what Royal Louis was like when she was launched at Brest in 1759.

The figurehead featured a lion. The ornaments of the aft were simplified, integrating the overall lines and structure of the ship.

== Sources and references ==
=== Sources ===
- 1760. Le Sans-Pareil (France), L'histoire de la Marine de 1700 à 1850, Direction Jacques Martin, Collaboration Historique et Technique Marjolaine Matikhine et Georges Fouillé, Bob de Moor.
- Maquette de bateau, Sans Pareil, vaisseau de 108 canons, 18e siècle, Musée national de la Marine
- Roche, Jean-Michel (2005). Dictionnaire des bâtiments de la flotte de guerre française de Colbert à nos jours. Vol. 1. Group Retozel-Maury Millau. ISBN 978-2-9525917-0-6. OCLC 165892922. (1671-1870)
