= Spy (1781 ship) =

French ship

History

Great Britain
- Name: Spy
- Launched: 1780, France
- Acquired: 1781 by purchase of a prize
- Fate: Wrecked August 1795

General characteristics
- Tons burthen: 150, or 190, or 192, or 200 (bm)
- Complement: 30
- Armament: 10 guns

Spy was built in France in 1780, almost surely under another name, and taken in prize. The British East India Company (EIC) purchased her in 1781 and used her for almost two years as a fast packet vessel and cruiser based in St Helena. It then sold her and she became a London-based slave ship, making two voyages in the triangular trade carrying enslaved people from West Africa to the West Indies. She then became a whaler, making seven whaling voyages between 1786 and 1795. She was probably wrecked in August 1795 on a voyage as a government transport.

== EIC packet ==
One source states that Spy was built in the Thames for the EIC, but that appears to be a mistake. The EIC had her surveyed before purchasing her. The same source states that she sailed to Bombay and Bengal. Actually, she never sailed east of the Cape of Good Hope (the Cape). The EIC stationed her at St Helena and had her patrol in nearby waters.

Year	Master	Owner	Trade	Source
1782	Sherwood	East India Co.	East Indies	LR
1783	Sherwood	East India Co.	East Indies	LR

Spy, John Sherwood, master, sailed from Gravesend on 13 December 1781, and Portsmouth on 6 February 1782 and arrived at St Helena on 13 June. She sailed from there on 18 August and returned on 7 September. She sailed from St Helena on 23 September and returned on 11 October. She sailed from St Helena on 16 November and returned on 6 December. She sailed from St Helena on 10 March 1783 and returned on 1 April. She sailed on 17 May and returned on 1 June. On 8 September she was at the Cape and she returned on 7 October. She returned to the Downs on 8 December. She was back at London by 16 December.

One source states that in 1784 the EIC sent Spy out to St. Helena and stationed her there permanently as a guard ship. It did not. Instead, it sold her to Camden and Calvert, who went on to employ Spy as a slave ship.

Year	Master	Owner	Trade	Source
1784	Sherwood; T.Wilson	East India Co. Camden & Co.	East Indies; London–Africa	LR

== Transporting enslaved people ==
The preeminent database on the trans-Atlantic slave trade confuses two vessels. It gives Spy the origins and dimensions of Stag, of 337 tons (bm). Stag was launched in 1774 in France and captured circa 1779. It then attributes to Stag the burthen (200 tons), of Spy. The probable source of the confusion is that in 1786 Captain Thomas Wilson transferred from Spy to Stag, which had been renamed Spy in 1784, with the change of name not making it into Lloyd's Register until 1787.

1st voyage transporting enslaved people (1784-1785): Captain Thomas Wilson sailed from London on 12 August 1784. Spy started acquiring captives on 1 December at Cape Coast Castle. She sailed from Africa on 1 March 1785 and arrived at Montego Bay, Jamaica on 4 May with 350 captives. She sailed from Jamaica on 24 June and arrived back at London on 23 August.

2nd voyage transporting enslaved people (1785–1786): Captain Thomas Wilson sailed from London on 28 September 1785. Spy acquired captives at Cape Coast Castle and then at Anomabu. She embarked 450 in all and left Africa on 26 March 1786. She arrived at Grenada with on 20 May with 430 captives, having lost 20 on the voyage. She disembarked 424. She arrived back at London on 1 August.

On her return her owners, Camden & Calvert, decided to try whaling instead of continuing transporting enslaved people. Captain Wilson transferred to another Spy, the former Stag, and continued transporting enslaved people.

== Whaler ==
Year	Master	Owner	Trade	Source
1787	T.Wilson; T.Wier	A.Calvert	Africa–London; London–Southern Fishery	LR

1st whaling voyage (1786–1787): Captain J. Brown sailed from London on 31 August 1786, bound for the Brazil Banks. (Note: The Brazil Banks are the edge of the continental shelf to the east and south of latitude 16°S of the coast of South America.) Spy returned on 22 June 1787 with 10 tuns of sperm oil, 55 tuns of whale oil, and 38 cwt of whale bone.

Calvert & Camden sold Spy to King & Co.

2nd whaling voyage (1787–1788): Captain Thomas Wyer (or Wier) sailed from London on 4 December 1787, bound for the Brazil Banks. Spy returned on 19 August 1788 with 50 tuns of sperm oil.

3rd whaling voyage (1788–1789): Captain William Fitch sailed from London in 1788, bound for the coast of Africa. In January 1789 she and several other whalers, including Lord Hawkesbury, were "all well" off the coast of Guinea. In June she had 240 barrels of spermaceti oil. Spy returned on 25 August 1789 with 56 tuns of sperm oil. In 1789 she underwent repairs.

4th whaling voyage (1789-1791): Captain Fitch sailed from London on 12 November 1789. Spy returned on 10 January 1791.

5th whaling voyage (1791-1792): Captain Fitch sailed in 1791. On 3 February 1792, Spy, Fitch, master, was at the Cape of Good Hope, together with Lucy, Chaser, and several other whalers. Spy returned to England on 25 June 1792.

Apparently Calvert & Co. were once again owners of Spy.

6th whaling voyage (1792-1793): Captain Fitch sailed in 1792, bound for Brazil. Spy returned on 5 April 1793 with 105 tuns of whale oil and 75 cwt of whale bone.

7th whaling voyage (1793-1795): Captain Fitch sailed from London on 17 October 1793, bound for the coast of Peru. Spy returned on 26 July 1795.

== Fate ==
LR continued to carry Spy through 1797, but with stale data. However, a Spy, Howard, master, was lost in the last week of August near Dungeness. She was outbound as a government transport; her crew were rescued. A second report had her running on shore at Dymchurch. She had been carrying men from the 3rd Regiment (The Old Buffs), who were safely landed.
