= Chaser (1778 ship) =

British and French warship, and British whaler and merchant ship (1778-1795)

History

Great Britain
- Name: Chaser
- Launched: 1778, East Indies
- Fate: Sold 1 January 1781

Great Britain
- Name: HMS Chaser
- Acquired: 1 January 1781 by purchase
- Captured: 14 February 1782

France
- Name: Chasseur
- Acquired: 14 February 1782 by capture
- Captured: 15 January 1783

Great Britain
- Name: HMS Chaser
- Acquired: 15 January 1783 by capture
- Fate: Sold 28 August 1784

Great Britain
- Name: Chaser
- Acquired: 1784 by purchase
- Fate: Wrecked late 1795

General characteristics
- Tons burthen: 320, or 350, or 374 (bm)
- Length: 99 ft 0 in (30.2 m)
- Beam: 76 ft 9 in (23.4 m)
- Depth of hold: 28 ft 0 in (8.5 m)
- Sail plan: Sloop
- Complement: 125 (Navy)
- Armament: 14 × 6–pounder guns (Navy)

Chaser (or Chacer) was built in the East Indies in 1778. The Royal Navy purchased her in 1781 and commissioned her as HMS Chaser. A French frigate captured her in 1782 but the Royal Navy recaptured her in 1783 and took her back into service. She was present at a major battle and then sailed to England where the Navy sold her in 1784. As the mercantile Chaser she made five or six voyages as a whaler in the British northern whale fishery and then two to the southern whale fishery. On her way home from the second a French privateer captured her, but some of her crew recaptured her. Next, she began trading with Honduras but was wrecked in late 1795 as she was returning from there to London.

== Career ==
Chaser's career prior to her purchase by the Royal Navy is obscure. At least one source conjectures that she was the French privateer Chasseur, built 1781 at Bordeaux, but this is highly implausible, given that the records of the Royal Navy show it purchasing Chaser on 1 January 1781. Also, one source on French naval vessels, which Chaser briefly became, makes no mention of such an origin.

== Royal Navy ==
Chaser came into the Royal Navy on 1 January 1781 in the East Indies by purchase. The future Rear-Admiral Thomas Troubridge was promoted to Lieutenant in her. He had purchased her and he commissioned her; he left her on 3 March. Commander Robert Montagu replaced him briefly. Commander Thomas Parr replaced Montagu.

On 14 February 1782 was cruising between Palmyras Point and Point Gurdawar, India. At daybreak Chaser sighted a strange vessel and approached it, but when the stranger did not respond to signals or show her colours, Chaser sought to sail away. The strange vessel gave chase and by 5p.m. was close enough to open fire, destroying Chaser's sails and rigging. Unable to escape, Parr was forced to strike. Chaser's captor turned out to be the 32-gun French frigate Bellone. Parr had one man killed and three wounded; the French had two men killed and four men wounded.

Chaser had been carrying 12 lakh rupees.

== French Navy ==
The French commissioned Chaser as the 18-gun corvette Chasseur on 20 February 1782.

On 15 January 1783 HMS Medea recaptured Chaser. Chaser was carrying dispatches that revealed that the French fleet under Admiral Pierre André de Suffren had returned to the Coromandel coast while Admiral Sir Edward Hughes was still refitting at Bombay. Medea sent Chaser, under the command of Lieutenant Thomas Campbell of Medea, to Bombay to advise Admiral Hughes.

French records show that a British frigate recaptured Chasseur in March 1783 after "a violent fight where Chasseur lost many men".

== Royal Navy ==
Lieutenant Edward Buller was promoted to Commander into Chaser and recommissioned her in April 1783. She was at the Battle of Cuddalore (1783) on 20 June 1783. In November Chaser was caught in a terrible hurricane on the Coromandel Coast and it was widely expected that she would have foundered. However, Buller knew the waters and sailed her into the Gulf of Mannar, where she was able to ride out the hurricane.

Shortly after the encounter with the hurricane, Buller sailed a battered Chaser for England. He stopped at St Helena where he met Prince Lee Boo. Buller took the Prince aboard Chaser and another navy vessel so that the Prince might observe the crews exercising the guns and small arms.

Chaser arrived at Deptford on 22 July 1784. The Navy sold Chaser there for £1,200 on 28 August 1784.

== Mercantile service ==
Chaser first appeared in online issues of Lloyd's Register (LR), in 1786.

Year	Master	Owner	Trade	Source & notes
1786	R.Lawson	Smith & Co.	London–Greenland	LR; damages repaired 1785

Chaser was sailing as a whaler to the northern whale fishery.

Year	Master	Where	Wales
1785	Lawson	Greenland	3
1787	Lawson	Greenland	3
1788	Lawson	Greenland	7

Year	Master	Owner	Trade	Source & notes
1789	R.Lawson; Smith	Smith & Co.	London–Greenland	LR; damages repaired 1787 & 1789

Year	Master	Where	Wales
1789	Smith	Greenland	3

Year	Master	Owner	Trade	Source & notes
1791	Smith; W.Lloyd	Smith; Fiott & Co.	London–Greenland; London–Southern Fishery	LR; damages repaired 1787 & 1789

In 1790-91 a new owner moved Chaser from the northern whale fishery to the southern.

1st southern whale voyage (1791–1792): She sailed from Gravesend on 16 February 1791 for the South Seas. On 28 August she was at Delagoa Bay. On 3 February 1792, Lucy, Bayne, master, was at the Cape of Good Hope, together with Lucy, Spy, and several other whalers. On 28 February she was again at Delagoa Bay, with seven whales. On 8 April she sailed for London from Saldanha Bay with 225 tuns of whale oil. Lloyd's List reported in June that Chacer was at St Helena. She returned to London on 6 July.

Year	Master	Owner	Trade	Source & notes
1792	W.Lloyd; C.Clark	Fist & Co.	London–Southern Fishery	LR; damages repaired 1787 & 1789

2nd southern whale voyage (1792–1794): On 24 October 1792 Chaser, Clark(e), master, sailed for the South Seas from the Downs, bound for the Pacific Ocean. In January 1793 she was at Rio de Janeiro. He then sailed around Cape Horn to the coast of the Pacific. He returned and in June 1794 Lloyd's List reported that Chacer had been at St Helena.

Captain Clark decided to return to London by sailing around Great Britain and coming down from the north to avoid the encountering a privateer in the Channel. Instead, on 19 July a French privateer of 18 guns, from Lorient, captured Chacer. The privateer put a prize crew on Chaser, but left some of the crew on board. The second mate and three men recaptured her on the 27th and brought her into Peterhead. She arrived at Gravesend on 30 September. She had brought back 116 tuns of sperm oil, 114 tuns of whale oil, and 70 cwt of whale bone.

Year	Master	Owner	Trade	Source & notes
1795	C.Clark; W.Downes	Fist & Co. Miles & Co.	London–Southern Fishery; London–Honduras	LR; damages repaired 1787 & 1789
1796	W.Downes	Miles & Co.	London–Honduras	LR; damages repaired 1787 & 1789

== Fate ==
Chaser, Downs, master, sailed from Gravesend on 13 April 1795, bound for Honduras. Lloyd's List reported in November that she had arrived at Honduras. The next report, in February 1796, was that Chacer had been wrecked in Honduras Bay whilst on a voyage from British Honduras to London. Her crew had been saved.
