= HMS Pomona (1778) =

Enterprise-class Royal Navy frigate

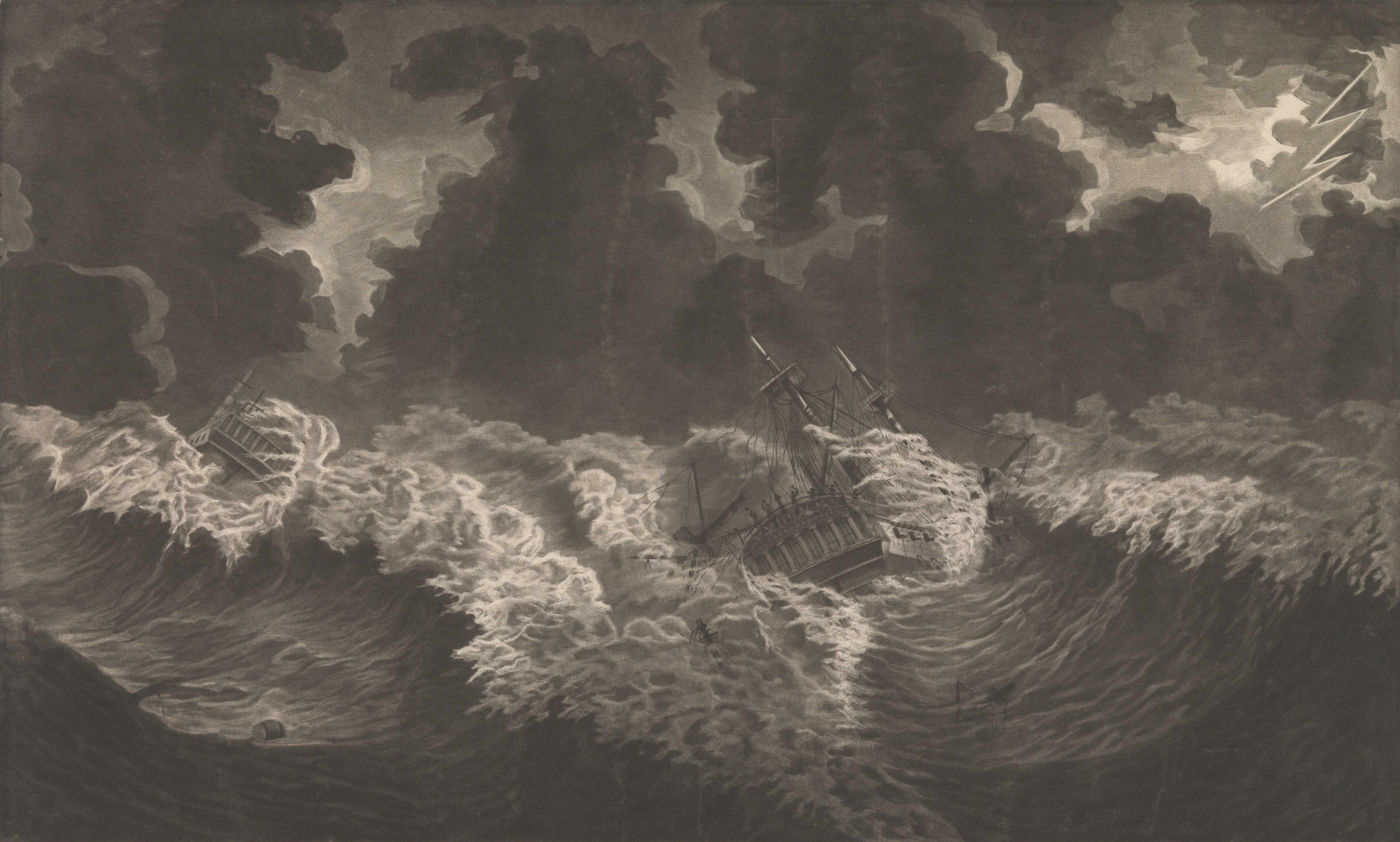
- Dismasting of Pomona and Ulysses in the Great Hurricane 6 October 1780

History

Great Britain
- Name: HMS Pomona
- Ordered: 7 March 1777
- Builder: Thomas Raymond, Chapel, Southampton
- Laid down: 8 May 1777
- Launched: 22 September 1778
- Completed: 17 December 1778 (at Portsmouth Dockyard)
- Commissioned: September 1778
- Renamed: Amphitrite in 1795
- Fate: Taken to pieces at Portsmouth August 1811

General characteristics
- Class & type: 28-gun Enterprise-class sixth-rate frigate
- Tons burthen: 59389/94 (bm)
- Length: 120 ft 8 in (36.78 m) (overall); 99 ft 6 in (30.33 m) (keel)
- Beam: 33 ft 6 in (10.2 m)
- Depth of hold: 11 ft 0 in (3.35 m)
- Sail plan: Full-rigged ship
- Complement: 200 officers and men
- Armament: Upper deck: 24 × 9-pounder guns; QD: 4 × 6-pounder guns + 4 × 18-pounder carronades; Fc: 2 × 18-pounder carronades; Also: 12 × swivel guns

HMS Pomona was a 28-gun Enterprise-class sixth-rate frigate of the Royal Navy. Pomona was first commissioned in September 1778 under the command of Captain William Waldegrave.

On 17 October 1779, Pomona, together with Lowestoffe, Charon, and Porcupine participated in the successful British attack on the Fort of San Fernandino de Omoa. As a result of the battle the British ships captured two Spanish prizes with a cargo of bullion worth in excess of $3,000,000. Pomona and Lowestoffe also shared in the prize money for the St. Domingo and her cargo, which included 124 serons (crates) of indigo.

Then on 15 June 1780, Pomona, Phoenix and Lowestoffe captured the brig Delaware, William Collins, Master. She was of 120 tons, armed with guns and had a crew of 53 men. She was sailing from Philadelphia to Port au Prince, with a cargo of flour and fish. More importantly, they also captured the French navy cutter Sans Pareil, of 16 guns and 100 men, as she was sailing from Martinique to Cap-Français. She was the former British privateer Non Such.

In 1795 Pomona was renamed Amphitrite after the previous Amphitrite was wrecked after striking an uncharted submerged rock whilst entering Leghorn harbour on 30 January 1794.

Sometime apx. early December, 1798 Amphitrite captured 2 French privateers, sending them into Barbados, and sank one.

== Fate ==
She was taken to pieces at Portsmouth August 1811.
