= List of ship launches in 1773 =

The list of ship launches in 1773 includes a chronological list of some ships launched in 1773.

Date	Ship	Class	Builder	Location	Country	Notes
5 March	Vecheslav	Pobedoslav Dunaisakii-class schooner	M. I. Ryabinin	Danube	Unknown	For Imperial Russian Navy.
14 March	Izmail	Pobedoslav Dunaisakii-class schooner	M. I. Ryabinin	Danube	Unknown	For Imperial Russian Navy.
8 April	Penguin	Survey vessel		Port Egmont	(Kingdom of Great Britain) Falkland Islands	For Royal Navy.
14 April	Brailov	Pobedoslav Dunaisakii-class schooner	M. I. Ryabinin	Danube	Unknown	For Imperial Russian Navy.
24 April	Evangelist Mark	Sixth rate	I. V. James	Saint Petersburg	Russia	For Imperial Russian Navy.
28 April	Tretii	Tretii-class frigate	O. Matveev	Novokhoperskaya	Russia	For Imperial Russian Navy.
29 April	Chetvertyi	Tretii-class frigate	O. Matveev	Novokhoperskaya	Russia	For Imperial Russian Navy.
7 May	Orpheus	Lowestoffe-class frigate	John Barnard	Harwich	Great Britain	For Royal Navy.
14 May	Pavel	Pavel-class frigate	G. Maltsev	Arkhangelsk	Russia	For Imperial Russian Navy.
18 May	Evstafii	Pavel-class frigate	G. Maltsev	Arkhangelsk	Russia	For Imperial Russian Navy.
18 May	Natalia	Pavel-class frigate	V. Gunion	Arkhangelsk	Russia	For Imperial Russian Navy.
24 May	Amazon	Amazon-class frigate	John & William Wells	Rotherhithe	Great Britain	For Royal Navy.
4 June	Espiègle	Lugger	Jacques Denys	Dunkirk	Kingdom of France	For French Navy.
7 July	Santa Maria Magdalena	Fifth rate	Reales Astilleros de Esteiro	Ferrol	Spain	For Spanish Navy.
19 July	Minerva	San Michiel Arcangelo-class ship of the line	Iseppo Coccon de Francesco	Venice	Republic of Venice	For Venetian Navy.
20 July	Greyhound	Mermaid-class frigate	Henry Adams	Bucklers Hard	Great Britain	For Royal Navy.
21 July	Legkii	Pavel-class frigate	V. Gunion	Arkhangelsk	Russia	For Imperial Russian Navy.
9 August	Vtoraia Ekaterina	Sixth rate			Russia	For Imperial Russian Navy.
22 August	Iezekiil	Third rate	V. A. Selyaninov	Saint Petersburg	Russia	For Imperial Russian Navy.
2 September	Fox	Enterprise-class frigate	Thomas Raymond	Northam	Great Britain	For Royal Navy.
17 September	Ambuscade	Amazon-class frigate	Adams & Barnard	Deptford	Great Britain	For Royal Navy.
20 September	Amerika	Aziia-class ship of the line	G. Maltsev	Arkhangelsk	Russia	For Imperial Russian Navy.
20 September	Aziia	Aziia-class ship of the line	G. Maltsev	Arkhangelsk	Russia	For Imperial Russian Navy.
1 October	Triton	Modified Mermaid-class frigate	Henry Adams	Bucklers Hard	Great Britain	For Royal Navy.
10 October	Conqueror	Royal Oak-class ship of the line	Israel Pownoll	Plymouth Dockyard	Great Britain	For Royal Navy.
16 October	York	East Indiaman	Bowater	Woolwich	Great Britain	For British East India Company.
18 October	Princess Royal	Barfleur-class ship of the line		Portsmouth Dockyard	Great Britain	For Royal Navy.
2 November	Siren	Enterprise-class frigate	John Henniker & Co	Chatham Dockyard	Great Britain	For Royal Navy.
2 November	Thetis	Amazon-class frigate	Wyatt & Co.	Bucklers Hard	Great Britain	For Royal Navy.
Unknown date	Columbia	Full-rigged ship		Norwell, Massachusetts	Thirteen Colonies	For private owner.
Unknown date	Elephanten	Ship of the line	Laurent Barbé	Copenhagen	Denmark-Norway	For Dano-Norwegian Navy.
Unknown date	Isabella	Merchantman			Thirteen Colonies	For private owner.
Unknown date	Kent	Merchantman	Peter Baker	Liverpool	Great Britain	For private owner.
Unknown date	Minerva	Merchantman		Bombay	India	For private owner.
Unknown date	Queen	Merchantman		Georgia	Thirteen Colonies	For Private owner.
Unknown date	San Miguel	Third rate		Barcelona	Spain	For Spanish Navy.
Unknown date	Santa Ines	Fifth rate	Reales Astilleros de Esteiro	Ferrol	Spain	For Spanish Navy.
Unknown date	Tiger	Merchantman		Maryland	Thirteen Colonies	For private owner.
Unknown date	Wagrien	Holsteen-class ship of the line			Denmark-Norway	For Dano-Norwegian Navy.
Unknown date	Zwaluw	Full-rigged ship		Amsterdam	Dutch Republic	For Dutch Navy.
