= HMS Triton (1773) =

Frigate of the Royal Navy

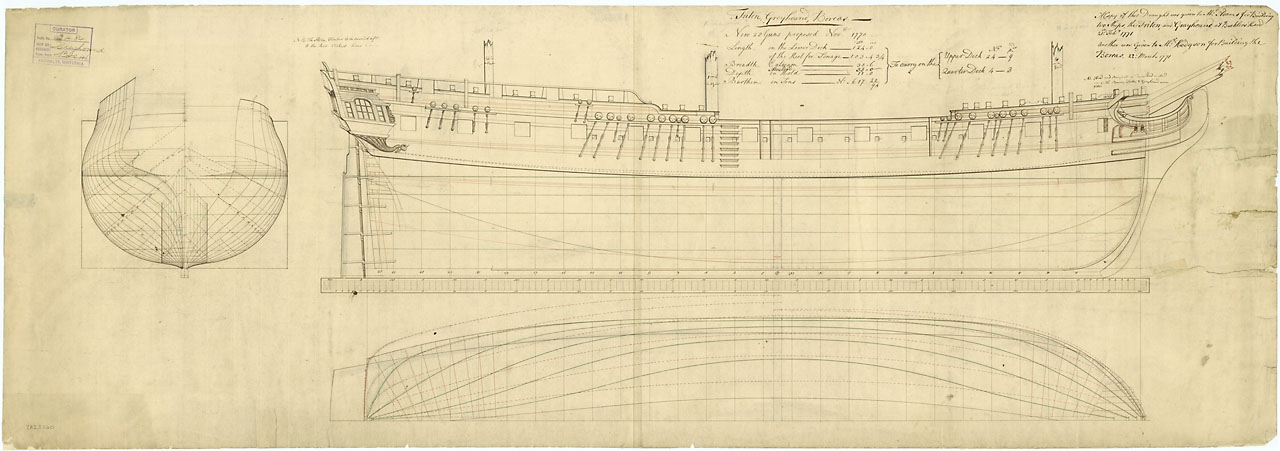

History

Great Britain
- Name: HMS Triton
- Ordered: 25 December 1770
- Builder: Henry Adams, Bucklers Hard
- Laid down: February 1771
- Launched: 1 October 1773
- Completed: 4 November 1775 at Portsmouth Dockyard
- Commissioned: August 1775
- Fate: Taken to pieces at Deptford in January 1796

General characteristics
- Class & type: Modified Mermaid-class frigate
- Tons burthen: 620 21/94 (bm)
- Length: 124 ft 1 in (37.82 m) (gundeck); 103 ft 4.625 in (31.51188 m) (keel)
- Beam: 33 ft 7 in (10.24 m)
- Depth of hold: 11 ft (3.4 m)
- Sail plan: Full-rigged ship
- Complement: 200 officers and men
- Armament: 28 guns comprising; Upper deck: 24 × 9-pounder cannon; Quarterdeck 4 × 3-pounder cannon; 12 swivels

HMS Triton was a modified Mermaid-class sixth-rate 28-gun frigate of the Royal Navy. She was ordered on 25 December during the Falklands Crisis of 1770, a conflict that was resolved the following January, before work on her had begun. Launched in October 1773, she first served in the American Revolutionary War in operations against the rebels on the St Lawrence River. In 1780, she sailed with Rear admiral George Rodney's fleet for the Relief of Gibraltar and on 8 January, assisted in an attack on a Caracas Convoy off the coast of Spain, capturing several Spanish merchant ships. Later that month she played a role at the Battle of Cape St Vincent. During the French Revolutionary Wars Triton served on the Jamaica Station and was present at the Battle of the Saintes on 12 April 1782. She finally paid off in November 1795 and was broken up at Deptford Dockyard in January 1796.

== Design, construction and armament ==
HMS Triton was a 28-gun sailing frigate built for the Royal Navy and designed by Thomas Slade, a modified version of his Mermaid class. She was ordered on 25 December during the Falklands Crisis of 1770, a conflict that was resolved the following January, before work on her had begun.

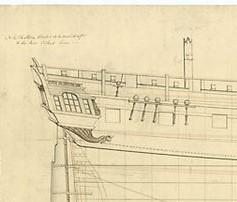
Triton's stern, showing the modified gallery with large round-top window

Slade’s original Mermaid class was designed in 1760 as a diminutive version of the captured French ship, Abénaquise. Three were built, smaller in size and carrying fewer guns, of a smaller calibre than the prize on which they were based. When the design was resurrected for the second batch, it was presented with a slightly longer keel (Note: The original Mermaid class was designed to have a keel length of 102 ft 8 1/8 in (31.296 m); the modified Mermaids, 103 ft 4 3/4 in (31.515 m); 8 5/8 in (220 mm) longer.) and instead of the more common three equal-sized rectangular windows that comprised the quarter gallery lights, the central section was enlarged and sported a rounded top. Triton and her sister ships, HMS Greyhound and Boreas were also given an increased sheer fore and aft, raising the bowsprit in the process and necessitating other minor alterations to the topside. Slade included a separate framing plan with his design; a new idea at the time.

Triton's keel of 103 ft 4 5/8 in (31.512 m) was laid down in February at Bucklers Hard, Beaulieu, Hampshire under the supervision of the master shipwright Henry Adams. As built, her dimensions were 124 ft 1 in (37.82 m) along the gundeck with a beam of 33 ft 7 in (10.24 m) and a depth in hold of 11 ft (3.4 m), making her 620 21/94 tons burthen (bm).

Triton was a sixth rate, built to carry a main battery of twenty-four 9-pounder (4.1-kilogram) long guns on her upper deck, four 3 pounders (1.4 kilograms) on the quarterdeck and twelve 1/2 pounder (0.23 kilograms) swivel guns. In August 1779, an Admiralty order added six 18-pounder (8.2-kilogram) carronades; four on the quarterdeck and two on the forecastle. (Note: Carronades were lighter so could be manoeuvred with fewer men, and had a faster rate of fire but had a much shorter range than the long gun.) A further order in the February following called for the 3-pounder guns to be upgraded to 6 pounders (2.7 kilograms). (Note: The gun-rating of a vessel was the number of long guns it was designed to carry and did not always match its actual armament. Before 1817, carronades were not counted at all unless they were direct replacements for long guns.)

The new Mermaid class were not great sailers in general but performed well to windward, making 10 -11 knots when close-hauled in a topgallant gale. (Note: The strongest wind in which a frigate can safely carry her topgallant sails; Equivalent to force 5-6 on the Beaufort Scale.) The fastest speed recorded was of 12 knots when running before the wind.

== Service ==
Following her launch on 1 October 1773, she was taken to Portsmouth Dockyard for full fitting out, a process that took two years. She was first commissioned in August 1775 under Captain Skeffington Lutwidge, prior to her completion (fitting out) in November 1775. In March 1776, she made her first trans-Atlantic voyage, initially to North America to take part in the American Revolutionary War. From 1777, Triton was stationed in the St Lawrence River where she remained for the next two years, capturing the privateer "Pompey" on 13 June 1778. Some of her crew also took part in operations on Lake Champlain during that time.

From February to April 1779 she was fitted with a copper bottom at Chatham Docks. She was fitted with six extra heavy guns in August. Returning to America she captured the American privateer "Gates" in September 1779.

Triton joined Rear admiral George Rodney's fleet for the Relief of Gibraltar and was present at the action on 8 January 1780 off Cape Finisterre. The British fleet of 24 ships encountered and attacked a Spanish convoy from Caracas comprising 22 ships, including seven men of war; the entire convoy was taken. The vessels that had been carrying naval stores to the Spanish fleet at Cádiz, and baled goods for the Guipuzcoan Company of Caracas were sent to England under escort of HMS America and Pearl, while those loaded with provisions were added to the supplies bound for Gibraltar. Several ships were taken into the Royal Navy including the 64-gun Spanish flagship Guipuzcoano which was renamed after Prince William who was serving in Rodney’s fleet at the time. The four captured frigates were not commissioned but the two brigs, Corbetta San Fermin and San Vicente were.

Eight days later, on 16 January, Triton was at the Battle of Cape St Vincent. Rodney had been warned that a Spanish squadron was in the area and had already had his ships cleared for action when he passed the Cape. The enemy were spotted at 13:00 to the south-east and the British ships raced to cut them off from the shoreline on the leeward side. HMS Bedford, Defence Edgar Resolution engaged first at around 16:00 and a running battle continued into the night. By the time the fighting had stopped at 02:00 seven Spanish ships had been captured or destroyed and the remainder driven off.

The British fleet arrived at Gibraltar on 19 January and shortly after, Triton, along with HMS Invincible, Marlborough and Defence, was dispatched with supplies to Minorca. After spending two days at Mahón the squadron left to rejoin Rodney, arriving on 14 February with dispatches from the island’s governor, James Murray, and news that no enemy ships had been encountered on either leg of the journey. Rodney had by this time repaired his ships and having been ordered to the Leeward Islands Station on completion of the Gibraltar mission, set sail with his fleet on 18 February.

After spending some time in the Leeward Islands, Triton returned home in May. By June however, she was back in the West Indies under a new captain, John McLaurin, who took the ship to Tobago in May 1781 and was present on 12 April 1782 at the Battle of the Saintes where Rodney's ships-of-the-line defeated a French fleet under the Comte de Grasse, forcing the French and Spanish to abandon a planned invasion of Jamaica. Afterwards she was berthed at St Kitts. The ship paid off in October and in March 1783 was taken to Limehouse Docks in London for 'major repairs' which took until August 1784.

Triton was recommissioned in June 1790 under Captain George Murray and refitted at Deptford between May and July that year. She sailed for the Baltic in April 1791 where Murray had been ordered to survey the Great Belt and the waters around Copenhagen. The information proved invaluable when Vice-Admiral Horatio Nelson attacked the Danes ten years later at the Battle of Copenhagen. On 6 September 1791, Triton sailed for the Jamaica Station, a Royal Navy command based at Port Royal. She was still serving there when Britain entered the French Revolutionary War in February 1793, part of a squadron under the station's commander, Commodore John Ford, comprising his flagship the fourth-rate Europa, two further sixth-rate frigates Penelope and Proserpine and five smaller craft.

In April 1794 Captain Scory Barker took command and on 8 March 1795, Triton made on one final trip to Jamaica before returning to England with a convoy in August. She was paid off in November and broken up at Deptford in January 1796.
