= HMS Gladiator (1783) =

British fifth-rate frigate (1783–1817)

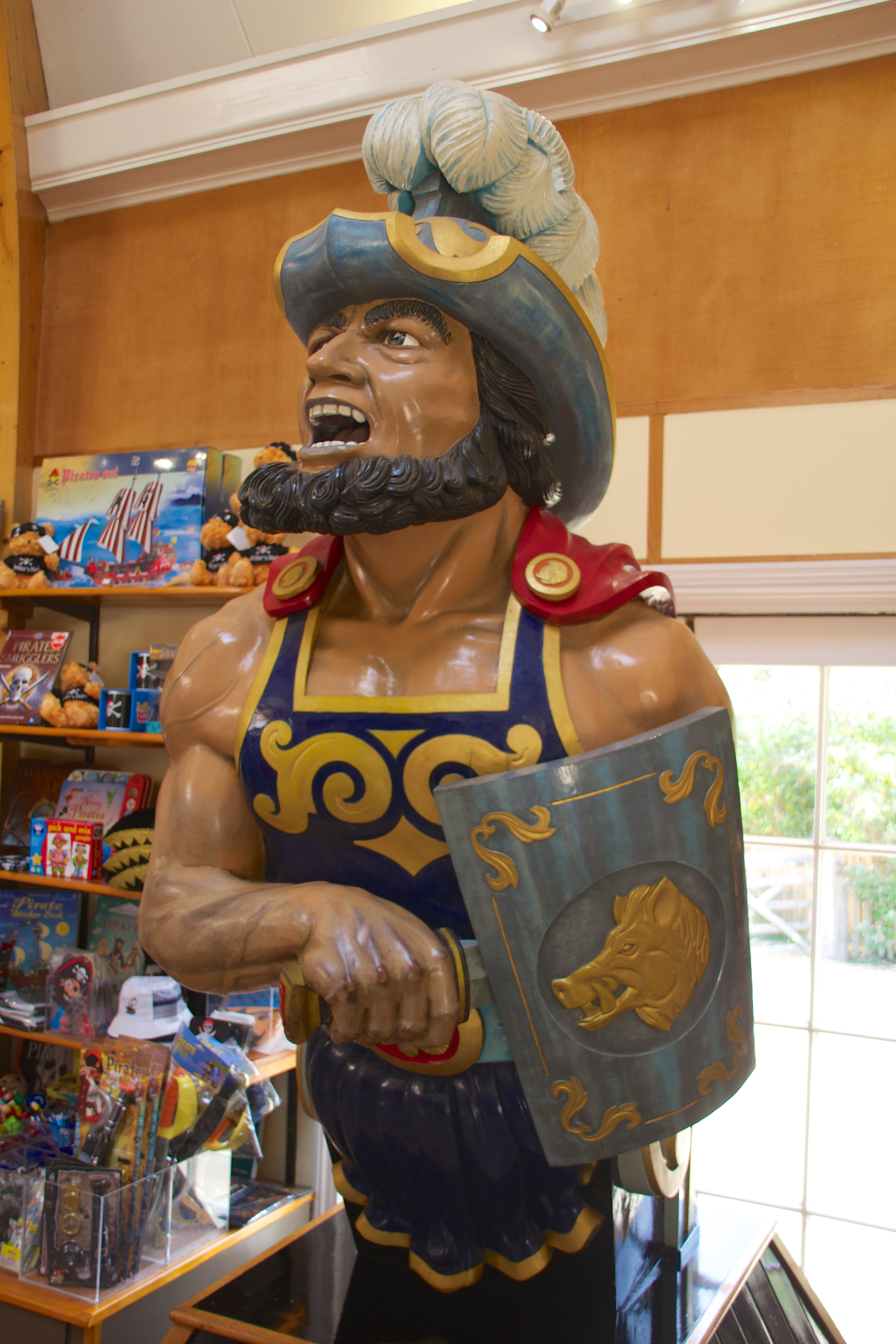
- Replica of HMS Gladiator's figurehead at Buckler's Hard

History

Great Britain
- Name: HMS Gladiator
- Builder: Adams, Bucklers Hard
- Launched: 20 January 1783
- Fate: Broken up in August 1817

General characteristics
- Class & type: Roebuck-class ship
- Type: 44-gun fifth rate
- Tons burthen: 882 tons (exact; bm)
- Length: 140 ft (42.7 m) (overall); 115 ft 1 in (35.1 m) (keel)
- Beam: 37 ft 11 1/2 in (11.6 m)
- Draught: 10 ft 10 1/2 in (3.3 m) (unladen); 14 ft 8 in (4.5 m) (laden)
- Depth of hold: 16 ft 5 in (5.0 m)
- Propulsion: Sails
- Sail plan: Full-rigged ship
- Armament: Lower deck: 20 × 18-pounder guns; Upper deck: 22 × 12-pounder guns; FC: 2 × 6-pounder guns

HMS Gladiator was a 44-gun fifth-rate Roebuck-class ship of the Royal Navy. She was launched on 20 January 1783 by Henry Adams of Bucklers Hard. She spent her entire career on harbour service, never putting to sea. Even so, her crew earned prize money for the seizure of two Russian and five American ships. Her static existence made her an excellent venue for courts-martial and a number of notable ones took place aboard her. She was broken up in 1817.

== Career ==
Gladiator was commissioned in December 1792 under Lieutenant Samuel Hayter as a convalescent ship. Then, still under Hayter, she was recommissioned in February 1794 as a guardship. In December 1795 she was under the command of Lieutenant Stephen Parker, followed by Lieutenant Emanuel Hungerford from September 1799. She was Rear-Admiral Sir Richard Bickerton's flagship from February 1800 to May. Lieutenant Joseph Bromwich then took command of Gladiator, being succeeded in September by Lieutenant John Connolly. From December 1801 she was again a convalescent ship and the flagship for Rear-Admiral Sir John Holloway until April 1802 when she was paid off.

Gladiator was recommissioned in April 1803 under Lieutenant Thomas Harrison. From May she was again Holloway's flagship until June 1804 when she became Rear-Admiral Sir Isaac Coffin's flagship. In February 1807 she came under the command of Lieutenant John Price as a convalescent ship.

On 26 October 1807, Tsar Alexander I of Russia declared war on Great Britain. The official news did not arrive there until 2 December, at which time the British declared an embargo on all Russian vessels in British ports. Gladiator was one of some 70 vessels that shared in the seizure of the 44-gun Russian frigate Speshnoy (Speshnyy), then in Portsmouth harbour. The British seized the Russian storeship Wilhelmina (Vilghemina) at the same time. The Russian vessels were carrying the payroll for Vice-Admiral Dmitry Senyavin’s squadron in the Mediterranean. (Note: An able seaman on any one of the 70 British vessels received 14s 7½d in prize money.)

In 1811 Gladiator was under the command of Lieutenant Thomas Dutton and served as flagship for Rear-Admiral William Hargood. Lieutenant-Commander Charles Hewitt took command in July 1812, and Gladiator successively bore the flags of Rear Admirals Hargood, Edward Foote and Peter Halkett.

When news of the outbreak of the War of 1812 reached Britain, the Royal Navy seized all American vessels then in British ports. Gladiator was among the Royal Navy vessels then lying at Spithead or Portsmouth and so entitled to share in the grant for the American ships Belleville, Janus, Aeos, Ganges and Leonidas seized there on 31 July 1812. (Note: An ordinary seaman received 4s 1d; the Commander in Chief received £230 10s 8d.)

== Courts-martial ==
Because Gladiator spent her entire career in port, she provided a convenient venue for courts-martial. In 1800 alone she was the venue for over 30. In that year alcohol was causative in many cases, but not all.

On 3 July a court-martial tried John Duncan, seaman on HMS Hermione, for having murdered officers of that ship, or aiding and abetting thereof in September 1797, and then conveying the ship to the enemy at La Guaira. The charges were proven so the court directed that Duncan be hanged. The court-martial also ordered one man hanged for desertion, which was an unusually harsh verdict. However, the man had deserted three times, after having enlisted three times (under different names) and taken the bounty money. Also, there had been a large number of desertions at Portsmouth and the court's intent was to send a message. In 1802, Edward Hamilton, who led the boat action that recovered Hermione, stood trial aboard Gladiator for cruelty.

On 10 December 1797, a court-martial tried John Hubbard and George Hynes, seamen from HMS St George, for an unnatural crime. The court found them guilty and sentenced them to death.

On 13 November 1801, a court-martial on the ship tried Sir William Parker for having exceeded his duties as CinC of the Americas by dispatching two ships outside his area of duty, contrary to standing orders to keep them nearer the Americas for defence. He was honourably acquitted from the court martial after delivering a defence of his actions. However, it was said that the court martial had been political in nature, owing to a long-standing enmnity and dispute between Parker and Admiral John Jervis.

At least three courts-martial involved charges against Admirals. The first occurred between 23 and 26 December 1805, after the Battle of Cape Finisterre (1805). Admiral Robert Calder requested a court-martial to review his decision not to pursue the enemy fleet after the engagement. The court ruled that Calder's failure to pursue was an error of judgement, not a manifestation of cowardice or disaffection, and severely reprimanded him.

The second occurred between 6 and 11 March 1807. The accused was Sir Home Popham and the charge was that he had conducted an unapproved (and notably quixotic and unsuccessful) expedition to Buenos Ayres, leaving his duty station, the Cape of Good Hope, undefended. The charge was found proven and the court reprimanded Sir Home.

The third was the court-martial of Admiral Lord Gambier for his conduct of the Battle of the Basque Roads. Admiral Sir Eliab Harvey, who had commanded "The Fighting Temeraire" at the Battle of Trafalgar, believed that Gambier had missed an opportunity to inflict further damage upon the French fleet. He told Gambier "I never saw a man so unfit for the command of a fleet as Your Lordship." Thomas Cochrane threatened to use his parliamentary vote against Gambier for not committing the fleet to action. Gambier called for a court-martial to examine his conduct. The court, on 26 July 1809 exonerated Gambier. Consequently, neither Harvey nor Cochrane were appointed by the Admiralty to command for the duration of the war.

Another notable court-martial took place on 5–6 February 1810. The court-martial assembled to try Captain Warwick Lake for having marooned a sailor named Robert Jeffery of HMS Recruit on the desert island of Sombrero. Some months after Lake had abandoned the sailor, Lake's commanding officer, Sir Alexander Cochrane, discovered what had happened and immediately ordered Lake to retrieve Jeffery. When Recruit arrived at Sombrero, Jeffery could not be found. (An American ship had picked up Jeffery and he was eventually discovered some three years later in Massachusetts. He returned to Britain where Lake provided compensation in lieu of a suit.) The subsequent court-martial ordered that Lake be dismissed from the service.

On 23 April 1813, Gladiator was the venue for the court-martial of the officers and men of Java for the loss of their ship in the action with the Constitution on 29 December 1812. The court honourably acquitted Lieutenant Henry Ducie Chads and the other surviving officers and men of Java.

What was probably one of the last courts-martial held on Gladiator occurred between 18 and 21 August 1815. The subject was the conduct of Captain Daniel Pring, of Linnet, and the officers and men of the squadron at the Battle of Plattsburgh on Lake Champlain. The court honourably acquitted Captain Pring and the others.

== Fate ==
Gladiator was paid off on 5 October 1815. She was broken up in August 1817.
