= Henry Adams (shipbuilder) =

British shipbuilder

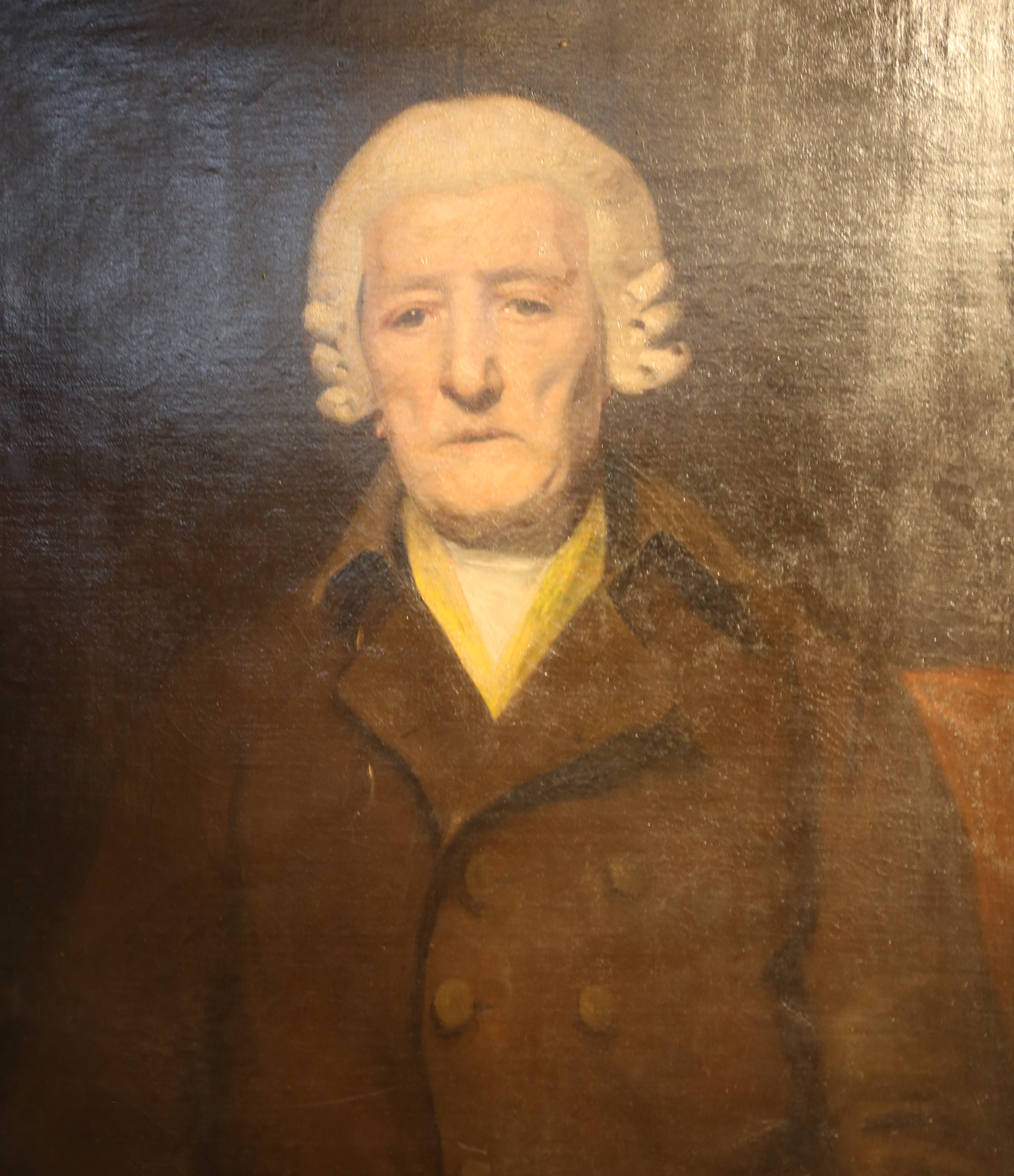
- Born: 1713
- Died: 1805 (aged 91–92)
- Occupation: Shipbuilder

Henry Adams (1713–1805) was a British Master Shipbuilder. He lived and worked at Bucklers Hard in Hampshire between 1744 and 1805.

His home is now known as The Master Builder's House Hotel, a 4-star hotel overlooking the Beaulieu River and the old slipways of Buckler's Hard. He was responsible for building many famous warships during the late 18th and early 19th centuries.

== Life ==
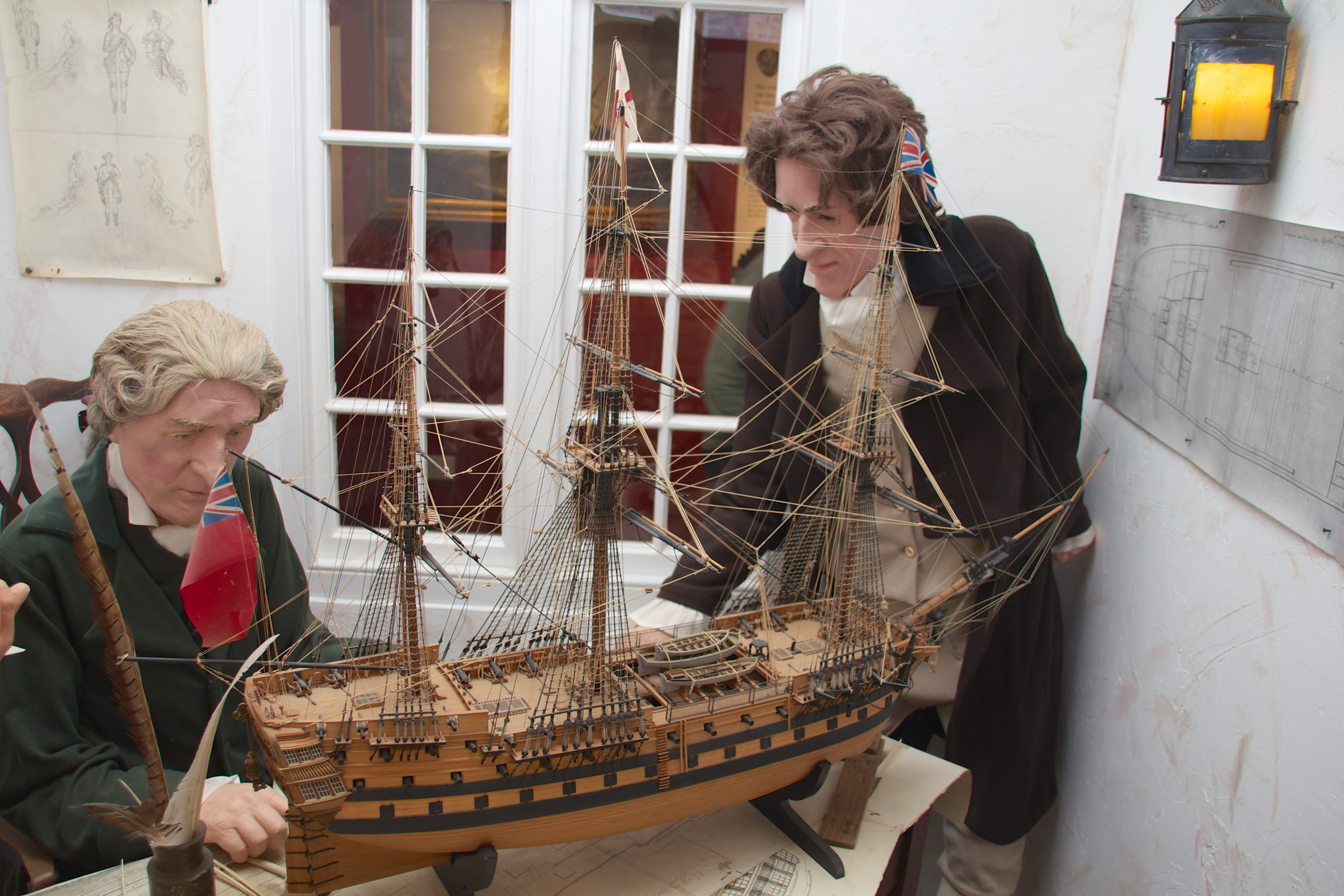
A model of Henry Adams discussing the plans for Swiftsure with Thomas Aylen at Bucklers Hard

Henry Adams was born in 1713, the son of Anthony Adams, a shipwright at Deptford Royal Dockyard. Following his father into trade, in 1726 Adams was apprenticed to the foreman of the dockyard, Benjamin Slade. Adams branched out in 1744, moving to Hampshire as naval overseer for the construction of the 20-gun frigate HMS Surprize at Buckler's Hard. In 1747 he married Elizabeth Smith of Beaulieu; they would go on to have two children who died in childhood before the death of Elizabeth in 1759. Buckler's Hard, at the time owned by James Wyatt, was in financial difficulties throughout this period. In March 1748 Adams took it over from Wyatt, being supported in his acquisition by John Montagu, 2nd Duke of Montagu.

In 1748, Henry Adams was successful in securing his first Admiralty contract, to construct the 28-gun sixth-rate vessel Mermaid. Mermaid was launched in May 1749 from the yard. As well as building merchant vessels, Adams received further contracts for several Royal Navy ships, including two 24-gun ships in 1756 and two 32-gun ships in 1757 and 1758. Further contracts included the 28-gun HMS Triton launched in 1773, the 28-gun HMS Greyhound also launched in 1773, and HMS Brilliant launched in 1779. Several of the figureheads, including that of Triton were built to a design by Adams.

Adams contracts with the Royal Navy culminated in the construction of larger sailing frigates, including several third-rate ships of the line. These included the 64-gun Agamemnon. Agamemnon was ordered on 5 February 1777 and launched on 10 April 1781. HMS Gladiator was also built under direction of Adams, being launched in January 1783.

He was responsible for the construction of HMS Indefatigable which saw fame under Captain Sir Edward Pellew during the action of 13 January 1797. He was also responsible for building HMS Illustrious, a 74-gun third rate that was launched in July 1789.

Two of the final ships built under this control at Buckler's Hard were Swiftsure and Euryalus during which his sons, Balthazar Adams and Edward Adams, took over control of the business from their father.
