= Swiftsure-class ship of the line =

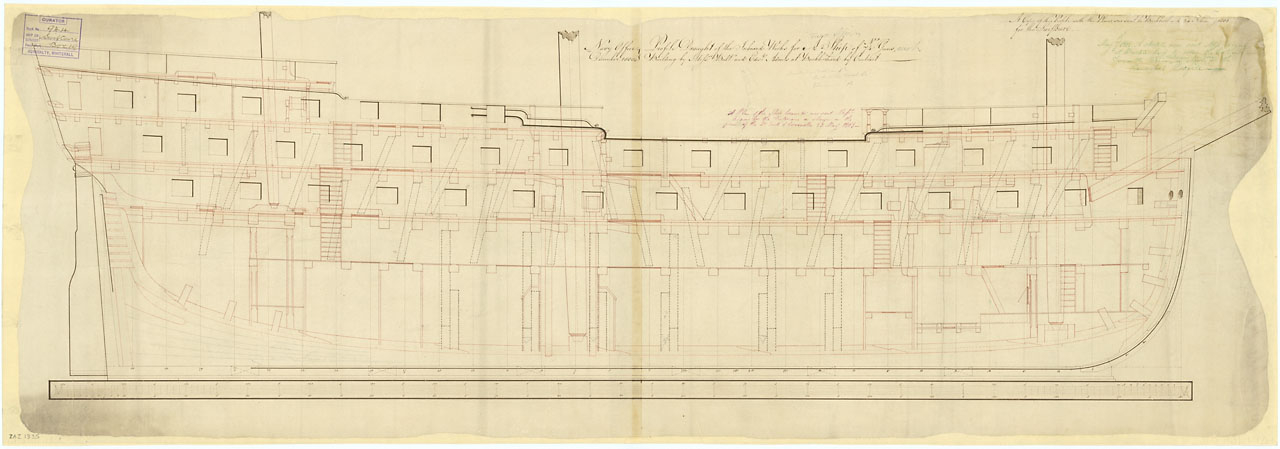

Class overview
- Name: Repulse
- Operators: Royal Navy
- Preceded by: Repulse class
- Succeeded by: Vengeur class
- In service: 23 July 1804 - 1862
- Completed: 2

General characteristics
- Type: Ship of the line
- Tons burthen: 1,704 17/94 (bm)
- Length: 173 ft (52.7 m) (gundeck)
- Beam: 47 ft 6 in (14.5 m)
- Depth of hold: 20 ft 9 in (6.3 m)
- Sail plan: Full-rigged ship
- Complement: 590
- Armament: 74 muzzle-loading, smoothbore guns; Gundeck: 28 × 32 pdr guns; Upper deck: 28 × 18 pdr guns; Quarterdeck: 4 × 18 pdr guns + 10 × 32 pdr carronades; Forecastle: 2 × 18 pdr guns + 2 × 32 pdr carronades; Poop deck: 6 × 18 pdr carronades

The Swiftsure-class ships of the line were a class of two 74-gun third rates, designed for the Royal Navy by Sir John Henslow.

== Ships ==
- HMS Swiftsure

Builder: Adams, Bucklers Hard
Ordered: 1800
Launched: 23 July 1804
Fate: Sold, 1845

- HMS Victorious

Builder: Adams, Bucklers Hard
Ordered: 21 December 1803
Launched: 20 October 1808
Fate: Sold, 1862
