= HMS Solebay (1763) =

Frigate of the Royal Navy

- Solebay

History

Great Britain
- Name: HMS Solebay
- Ordered: 30 January 1762
- Builder: Thomas Airey & Co, Newcastle-upon-Tyne
- Laid down: 10 May 1762
- Launched: 9 September 1763
- Completed: 15 March 1764 at Sheerness Dockyard
- Commissioned: August 1763
- Fate: Wrecked off Nevis 25 January 1782

General characteristics
- Class & type: Mermaid-class frigate
- Tons burthen: 619 4/94 (bm)
- Length: 124 ft 0 in (37.80 m) (gundeck); 102 ft 8.5 in (31.306 m) (keel)
- Beam: 33 ft 8 in (10.26 m)
- Depth of hold: 11 ft (3.4 m)
- Sail plan: Full-rigged ship
- Complement: 200
- Armament: 28 guns comprising; Upper deck: 24 × 9-pounder cannon; Quarterdeck 4 × 3-pounder cannon; 12 swivels.

HMS Solebay was a Mermaid-class sixth-rate frigate of the Royal Navy which saw active service between 1766 and 1782, during the latter part of the Seven Years' War and throughout the American Revolutionary War. After a successful career in which she captured seven enemy vessels, she was wrecked ashore on the Caribbean Island of Nevis.

== Construction ==
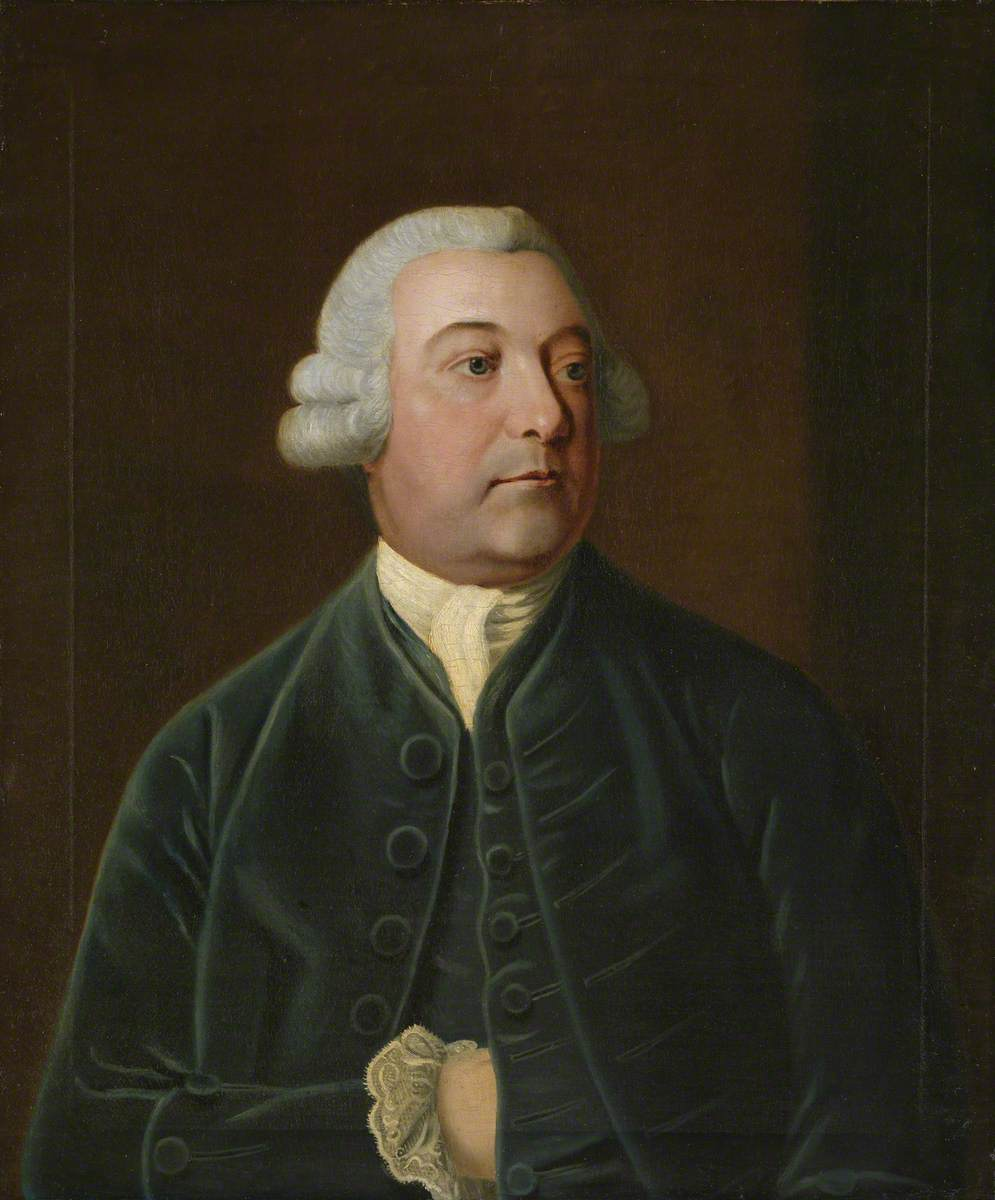
Sir Thomas Slade, naval architect for Solebay in 1760

Solebay was one of three Royal Navy vessels designed according to a 1760 schematic drawn up by Sir Thomas Slade, a naval architect and newly appointed Surveyor of the Navy. Slade had been impressed with the sailing qualities of a captured French vessel, Abénaquise, and used this vessel as his template for Solebay with modifications to incorporate a heavier hull and better sailing qualities in poor weather. His plans for the new 28-gun sixth-rate were approved by Admiralty on 30 January 1762. At the time, the Royal Dockyards were fully engaged in maintaining and fitting-out the Navy's ships of the line. Consequently, the contracts for Solebay were issued to a private shipyard, Thomas Airey and Company of Newcastle-upon-Tyne, with a requirement that the vessel be completed within 14 months at a cost of £9.3s per ton burthen.

Solebay's keel was laid down on 10 May 1762 and work proceeded swiftly with the vessel ready to be launched by 9 September 1763, just outside Admiralty's stipulated construction time. As built, Solebay was 124 ft 0 in (37.8 m) long with a 102 ft 8.5 in (31.3 m) keel, a narrow beam of 33 ft 8 in (10.26 m), and a hold depth of 11 ft 6 in (3.5 m). She measured 619 4/94 tons burthen. Construction and fit-out cost £9,979.7s, including provision of 24 nine-pounder cannons located along her gun deck, supported by four three-pounder cannons on the quarterdeck and twelve 1/2-pounder swivel guns ranged along her sides.

She was named on 30 April 1763 after Sole Bay in Southwold in Suffolk. In selecting her name the Board of Admiralty continued a tradition dating to 1644, of using prominent geographic features; Sole Bay having been the site of a naval engagement between the English and the Dutch in 1672. 17. Her designated complement was 200, comprising two commissioned officers – a captain and a lieutenant – overseeing 40 warrant and petty officers, 91 naval ratings, 38 Marines and 29 servants and other ranks. (Note: The 29 servants and other ranks provided for in the ship's complement consisted of 20 personal servants and clerical staff, four assistant carpenters, an assistant sailmaker, and four widow's men. Unlike naval ratings, servants and other ranks took no part in the sailing or handling of the ship.) Among these other ranks were four positions reserved for widow's men – fictitious crew members whose pay was intended to be reallocated to the families of sailors who died at sea.

== Career ==
Solebay commissioned in August 1763 under Captain William Hay. She captured sloop Hope 31 August 1776. In 1777-78 the vessel was used as a floating prison for John McKinly, the first President of Delaware, who was captured by the British Army after the Battle of Brandywine. On 28 January 1778 she chased ashore an unknown schooner near Cape Henry, schooner destroyed later that day. On 5 February a sloop ran aground off Cherry Point while being pursued by HMS Richmond and Solebay and was burned. On 9 February HMS Richmond and Solebay captured Maryland State Govt. trading vessel Lydia off St. Mary's River, later ruled a recapture. On 23 February she captured French ship Vicomte de Veaux off Cape Henry. On 5 March she captured a schooner, probably Newport, off Cape Henry. On 13 March 1778 she captured schooner Portsmouth 2 or 3 Leagues off Cape Henry.

On 9 December 1780 Solebay and Portland captured two French privateers behind the Isle of Wight after a short action. The two were Comptesse of Buzanisis, Lux, master, and Marques de Seiguley. Each had a crew of 150 men. Comptesse was armed with twenty 12-pounder guns and Marques was armed with twenty 9-pounder guns. In the action Solebay had one man wounded, and Portland had nine, two of whom died later. Comptesse of Buzanisis was believed to have been the English privateer Harpooner. The Royal Navy took Marques de Seiguley into service as the 14-gun sloop as HMS Marquis de Seignelay.
