= HDMS Elephanten (1773) =

Danish ship-of-the-line

History

Denmark
- Name: Elephanten
- Namesake: The Order of the Elephant
- Builder: Laurent Barbé
- Laid down: 1769
- Launched: 1773
- Decommissioned: 1801
- Home port: Copenhagen

General characteristics
- Type: Ship of the line
- Sail plan: Full-rigged ship
- Complement: 668
- Armament: 70 × 24-pdrs

HDMS Elephanten (1773) (Note: The ornamentation on this ship is depicted at the Royal Danish Naval Museum's website Elephanten by clicking "vis" and more directly here) was an 18th-century ship-of-the-line in the Dano-Norwegian navy, built at Nyholm in Copenhagen to a design by the Frenchman Laurent Barbé.

== Ship builder ==
Laurent Barbé was appointed to the Nyholm shipyards when his predecessor Knud Benstrup was sacked in 1740. As an experienced shipbuilder he produced technical drawings for a 76-gun ship-of-the-line which was built and saw service as HDMS Elephant (1741). He was reticent about revealing his construction methods to the Danish Naval Construction Commission but as a protege of the Count of Samsøe he survived in his position. Barbé also designed a frigate, a slightly smaller ship-of-the-line (of 70 guns) and a royal yacht. Elephanten was judged to be an excellent ship when it entered service, and the technical drawings became a standard for future similar ships. He also had failures and his frigate HDMS Æroe was a very mediocre sailer.

In 1743 he obtained various French ship designs, which were built at Copenhagen and in 1744 was commissioned to design and build a galley – which proved a good sailer but responded poorly when rowing. With the departure of Count Samsøe in November 1746, Barbé lost all support in the shipyard, had disagreements with the Construction Commission and was retired on a pension of 500 rdl in 1747.

Barbé continued to live in Copenhagen until his death, in straitened circumstances, on 21 March 1764. His collection of design drawings was seized on his dismissal and put into the Danish admiralty's collection for future use.

HDMS Elephanten (1773) is credited to the design of Barbé, although she was launched 26 years after Barbé's departure. (The plans available on line, for ornamentation drawn in 1772 and receiving royal approval, are signed Håndværksmester/Bygmester: Møllerup).

== The Ship ==
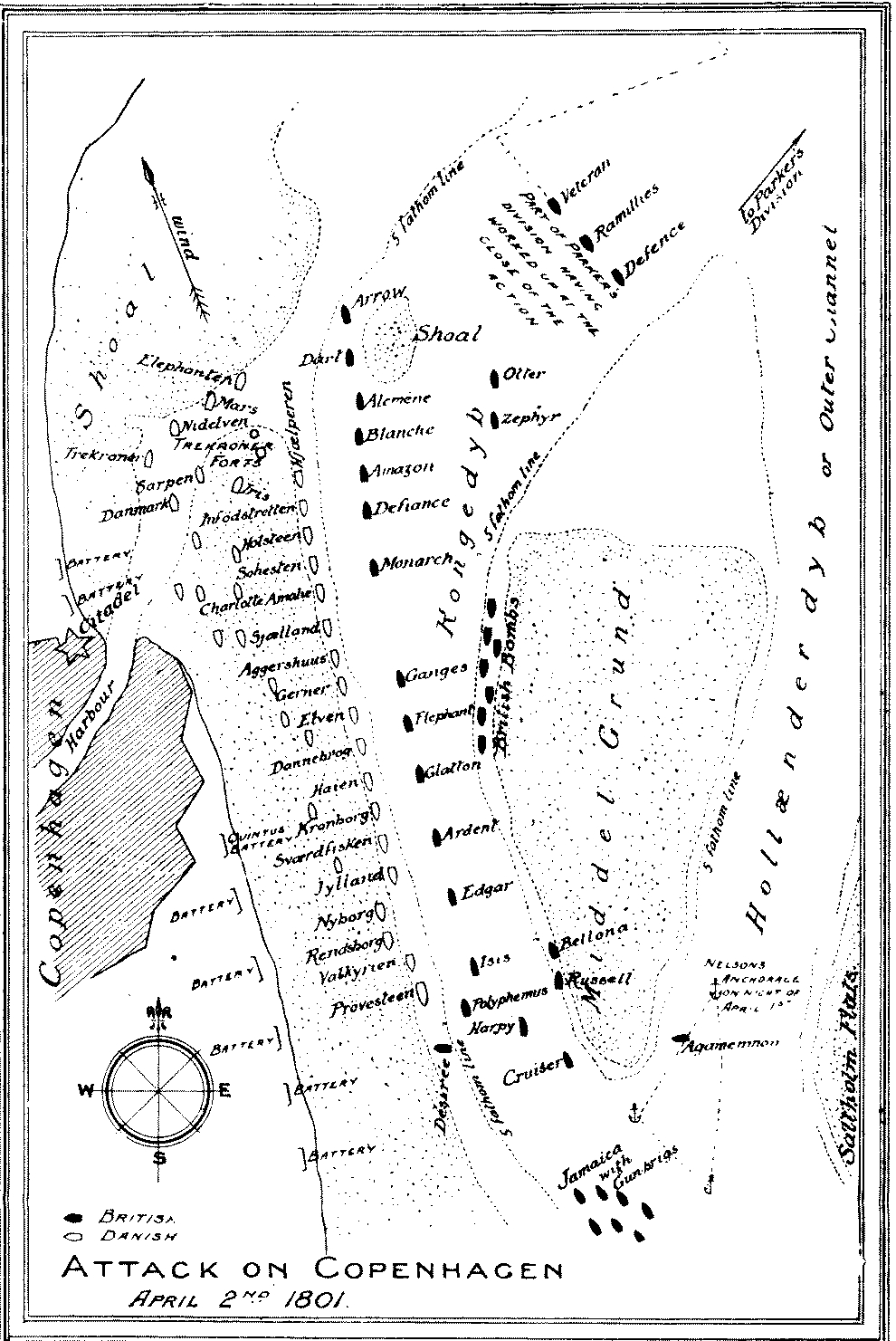
Sketch of the battle

During the Battle of Copenhagen in April 1801 HDMS Elephanten was in the inner harbour and not engaged in the fighting. Her namesake on the British side, HMS Elephant, was Nelson's flagship that day.

== Fate ==
Elephanten was decommissioned in the latter half of 1801, but may have been used as a storage facility for gunpowder until 1805, and thence as a blockship (Note: The title of a document stating this is recorded at the Royal Danish Naval Museum's website Elephanten by clicking "vis" but the document itself is missing)

== Citations ==
- Royal Danish Naval Museum list of ships Details, drawings and models for some named ships are available.
- Balsved: Danish Naval History website, The Navy Ships
- Bjerg H C: Laurent Barbe in Dansk Biografisk Leksikon, 3rd Ed., Gyldendal 1979–84. Accessed 18.May 2019
- History Today Vol 51 (4) April 2001
