= Action of 20 November 1779 =

1779 minor naval engagement of the European theater of the American Revolutionary War

- Part of the American Revolutionary War
| Date | 20 November 1779 |
| Location | off Lisbon, Atlantic |
| Result | British victory |

Belligerents
| Great Britain | Spain |

Commanders and leaders
| Elliot Salter | Unknown |

Strength
| 1 Fifth-rate frigate: HMS Hussar | 1 armed merchant ship: Nuestra Señora del Buen Consejo |

Casualties and losses
| 4 killed & 10 wounded | 1 armed merchant ship captured 38 killed or wounded 90 captured |

The Action of 20 November 1779 was a naval engagement of the European theatre of the American Revolutionary War that took place in the Atlantic. It was fought between a 50-gun Royal Naval ship against an armed Spanish register merchant ship that carried 26 guns.

On 19 November 1779 HMS Hussar with 28 guns, under Captain Elliot Salter, was accompanying HMS Chatham with 50 guns. They were in convoy, with trade from Lisbon to England when they saw a two-decked ship sailing away from the convoy and gave chase at once. Hussar came up next to the ship the next day and saw the Spanish flag that was being hoisted. Salter gave the order to attack. Hussar came alongside the Spanish ship and opened fire. Hussar had the weather gage and was able to rake the Spanish ship. After a number of broadsides and realising resistance was useless, the Spaniard surrendered after nearly 45 minutes of action.

The Spanish ship was the Nuestra Senora del Buen Consejo, a Peruvian registered ship from Lima pierced for 64 guns but mounting only 26 twelve-pounders with a crew of 120 sailors and marines. Consejo had 27 men killed and eight wounded. The rest was captured. The Hussar had four killed and ten wounded.

Buen Consejo carried a valuable cargo consisting of copper, pewter, cocoa, Jesuit's bark, minerals and private goods. Everything was taken by the British back to England.
