= HMS Marquis de Seignelay =

Sloop of the Royal Navy

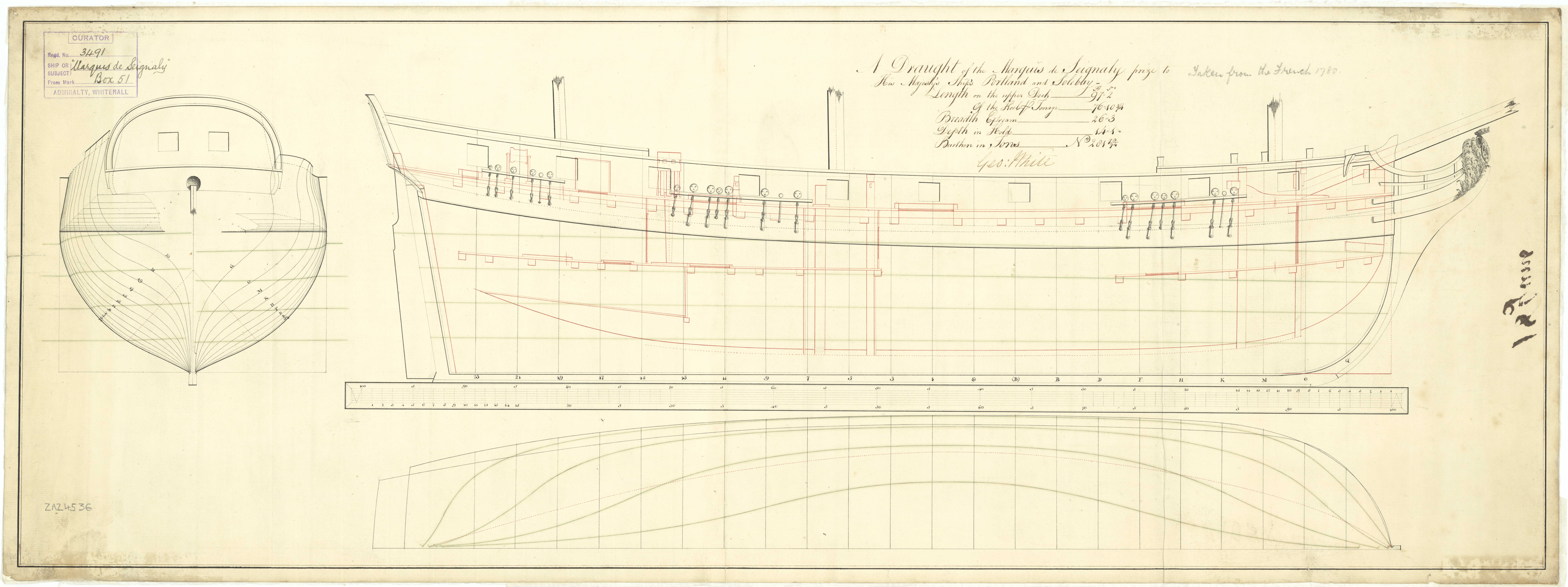
- Marquis de Seignaly

History

France
- Name: Marquis de Seignelay
- Namesake: Jean-Baptiste Colbert, Marquis de Seignelay
- Launched: 1779
- Captured: On 8 January 1780, by the Royal Navy

Great Britain
- Name: HMS Marquis de Seignelay
- Acquired: 10 December 1780 by capture
- Fate: Sold 1786

General characteristics
- Class & type: 16-gun ship-sloop
- Tons burthen: Privateer:280 (French; "of load"); HMS:28174/94 (bm)
- Length: 97 ft 2 in (29.6 m) (overall); 76 ft 10 3/4 in (23.4 m) (keel)
- Beam: 26 ft 3 in (8.0 m)
- Depth of hold: 14 ft 1 in (4.3 m)
- Propulsion: Sails
- Complement: Privateer:150–160; HMS:110
- Armament: Privateer:20 × 8-pounder guns + 8 swivel guns; HMS:14 × 6-pounder guns

HMS Marquis de Seignelay, was the French privateer Marquis de Seignelay from Le Havre, active in 1779–1800. The British Royal Navy captured her in 1780 and recommissioned her as the 14-gun sloop HMS Marquis de Seignelay. She was sold in March 1786.

== Privateer ==
Between 1779 and December 1780, Marquis de Seignelay, under the command of François Cottin, captured 40 ships totaling 117 guns and 418 prisoners.

Lloyd's List reported on 28 January 1780 that the French privateer Marquis of Seignety, of Dunkirk, with 160 men, had captured Harpooner, Hill, master, of 56 men and boys. The action had lasted two hours and Marquis had taken Harpooner into Havre de Grace.

== Capture ==
On 9 December 1780 HMS Solebay and Portland captured two French privateers behind the Isle of Wight after a short action. The two were Comptesse of Buzanisis, Lux, master, and Marques de Seiguley. Each had a crew of 150 men. Comptesse was armed with twenty 12-pounder guns and Marques was armed with twenty 9-pounder guns. In the action Solebay had one man wounded, and Portland had nine, two of whom died later. Comptesse of Buzanisis was believed to have been the English privateer Harpooner. (Note: Comtesse de Buzençois was a privateer active in November and December 1780 under André Lux. After the British captured her in December 1780 she was taken to Southampton. French records do not mention whether or not she was a former British privateer.)

== British Royal Navy ==
The Royal Navy commissioned Marquis de Seignelay (or Marquise de Seignelly) in November 1782. John Hunter was appointed to Commander in her on 12 November 1782. She was paid off in February 1786. The Navy sold her on 23 March. Hunter was promoted to post captain on 15 December 1786.
