= Harpooner (1771 ship) =

Ship launched at Liverpool in 1771

History

Kingdom of Great Britain
- Name: Harpooner
- Owner: P.Sheppard
- Builder: Liverpool
- Launched: 1771
- Captured: January 1780

France
- Name: Comptesse of Buzanisis
- Acquired: 1780 by capture
- Captured: December 1780

Kingdom of Great Britain
- Name: Harpooner
- Owner: J.Margetson
- Acquired: circa 1782 by purchase of a prize
- Renamed: Trelawney (1783)
- Fate: No longer listed after 1786

General characteristics
- Tons burthen: 200, or 230 (bm)
- Propulsion: Sail
- Complement: 56 (at capture)
- Armament: 20 × 12 & 12 × 4-pounder guns

Harpooner was launched at Liverpool in 1771. In 1778 she became a privateer. She captured at least two French merchantmen before a French privateer captured her in January 1780. She became the French privateer Comptesse of Buzanisis, which the Royal Navy recaptured. Harpooner returned to online records in 1782, and in 1783 became the slave ship Trelawney, which then made two complete voyages in the triangular trade in enslaved people. She was no longer listed after 1786.

== Career ==
=== Privateer ===
Harpooner entered Lloyd's Register (LR) in 1779 as a Cork-based privateer. Her master was G. Arnold, and her owner was Sheppard. She had undergone a thorough repair in 1778.

Lloyd's List (LL) reported on 16 March 1779 that privateer Harpooner, of London, Arnold, master, had captured two French vessels, Friendship and Achilles. Friendship had been sailing from France to America with bale goods, ammunition, etc. Achilles had sailed from San Domingo with sugar. Harpooner brought both into Cork. On 13 June Achilles arrived at Portsmouth from Cork. The value of her cargo of sugar and coffee was put at £18,000.

The 1780 volume of LR showed Harpooner's master as L. Hill, and that she was now based in London.

=== Capture ===
LL reported on 28 January 1780 that the French privateer Marquis of Seignety, of Dunkirk, with 160 men, had captured Harpooner, Hill, master, of 56 men and boys. The action had lasted two hours and Marquis had taken Harpooner into Havre de Grace. (Note: Marquis de Seignelay, from Le Havre, was a 280-ton ("of load") privateer under François Cottin, with 160 men, twenty 8-pounder guns and 8 swivel guns. Between 1779 and December 1780, she captured 40 ships totaling 117 guns and 418 prisoners. After the British captured her and recommissioned as the 14-gun sloop Marquis de Seignelay (or Marquis de Seigniary). She was eventually sold in March 1786.)

On 9 December 1780 HMS Solebay and Portland captured two French privateers behind the Isle of Wight after a short action. The two were Comptesse of Buzanisis, Lux, master, and Marques de Seiguley. Each had a crew of 150 men. Comptesse was armed with twenty 12-pounder guns and Marques was armed with twenty 9-pounder guns. In the action Solebay had one man wounded, and Portland had nine, two of whom died later. Comptesse of Buzanisis was believed to have been the English privateer Harpooner. (Note: Comtesse de Buzençois was a privateer active in November and December 1780 under André Lux. After the British captured her in December 1780 she was taken to Southampton. French records do not mention whether or not she was a former British privateer.)

=== Slave ship ===
Harpooner reappeared in the volume of Lloyd's Register for 1782. With Ramsey, master, she made a voyage to Quebec, Newfoundland, Oporto, and back to London. She then was registered at Liverpool in 1783 as Trelawney.

Vessel	Year	Master	Owner	Trade	Source & notes
Harpooner	1782	J.Ramsey	J[ames] Margetson	London	LR
Trelawny	1783	Thoburn	Margetson	Liverpool–Africa	LR; former "Harpooner"

1st voyage transporting enslaved people (1783–1784): Captain William Thoburn sailed from Liverpool on 23 March 1783. He acquired 470 captives at Cape Coast Castle, and on 1 December arrived at Kingston, Jamaica with 447, for a 9.5% mortality rate. Trelawney left Jamaica on 24 January 1784 and arrived back at Liverpool on 10 April.

2nd voyage transporting enslaved people (1784–1786): Captain William Thoburn sailed from Liverpool on 2 August 1784. He started acquiring captives at Cape Coast Castle on 27 December. Trelawney sailed from Africa on 1 September 1785 with 400 captives, and arrived at Kingston on 12 November with 350, for a 12.5% mortality rate. She had arrived at Kingston with Thoburn, master, and arrived back at Liverpool on 5 May 1786 with Bean, master.

== Fate ==
After her return from Africa, Trelawney no longer appeared in Lloyd's List's SAD data, or in Lloyd's Register.
