= HMS Swiftsure (1804) =

Ship of the line of the Royal Navy

- Swiftsure

History

United Kingdom
- Name: Swiftsure
- Ordered: 16 August 1800
- Builder: Henry Adams, Bucklers Hard
- Laid down: August 1802
- Launched: 23 July 1804
- Commissioned: August 1804
- Reclassified: As a receiving ship, May 1819
- Fate: Broken up, 18 October 1845

General characteristics
- Class & type: Swiftsure-class ship of the line
- Tons burthen: 1,725 73/94 (bm)
- Length: 173 ft (52.7 m) (gundeck)
- Beam: 47 ft 10 in (14.6 m)
- Draught: 18 ft 6 in (5.6 m) (light)
- Depth of hold: 20 ft 9 in (6.3 m)
- Sail plan: Full-rigged ship
- Complement: 590
- Armament: 74 muzzle-loading, smoothbore guns; Gundeck: 28 × 32 pdr guns; Upper deck: 28 × 18 pdr guns; Quarterdeck: 4 × 18 pdr guns + 10 × 32 pdr carronades; Forecastle: 2 × 18 pdr guns + 2 × 32 pdr carronades; Poop deck: 6 × 18 pdr carronades

HMS Swiftsure was the lead ship of her class of two 74-gun third-rate ships of the line built for the Royal Navy during the first decade of the 19th century. Completed in 1804, she participated in the Trafalgar campaign of 1805, including in the Battle of Trafalgar itself.

After the Napoleonic Wars, she was decommissioned, and repurposed as a receiving ship. She was broken up in 1845

== Description ==
The Swiftsure-class ship of the line was designed by Sir John Henslow, co-Surveyor of the Navy. Swiftsure measured 173 feet (52.7 m) on the gundeck and 141 feet 10 inches (43.2 m) on the keel. She had a beam of 47 feet 6 inches (14.5 m), a depth of hold of 20 feet 9 inches (6.3 m) and had a tonnage of 1,725 73/94 tons burthen. The ship's draught was 13 feet (4 m) forward and 18 feet 6 inches (5.6 m) aft at light load; fully loaded, her draught would be significantly deeper. The crew of the Swiftsures numbered 590 officers and ratings. The ships were fitted with three masts and ship-rigged.

They were armed with 74 muzzle-loading, smoothbore guns that consisted of twenty-eight 32-pounder guns on her lower gundeck and twenty-eight 18-pounder guns on her upper gundeck. Their forecastle mounted a pair of 18-pounder guns and two 32-pounder carronades. On their quarterdeck they carried four 18-pounders and ten 32-pounder carronades. Above the quarterdeck was their poop deck with half-a-dozen 18-pounder carronades.

== Construction and career ==
Swiftsure was the sixth ship of her name to serve with the Royal Navy. The ship was ordered on 16 August 1800 from Henry Adams and was laid down at his shipyard in Bucklers Hard in August 1802 by his sons Balthazar and Edward Adams. She was launched on 23 July 1804 and completed at Devonport Dockyard between 31 July and 24 September. Swiftsure was commissioned by Captain Mark Robinson in August 1805.

Coincidentally the French 74-gun ship Swiftsure also took part in the battle; she had originally been a British ship that the French had captured in 1801.

A large convoy of over 230 vessels, with Swiftsure as its flagship, departed Spithead anchorage on 2 December 1814 and arrived at Port Royal on 11 February 1815. (Note: 'A fleet of about 230 sail, under convoy of the Swiftsure of 74 guns, Capt. Adderley... and the Forward brig, of 14 guns, Capt Banks [set sail from the Solent on 2 December 1814]... On the 1st inst. the fleet arrived off Barbados... The Forward [escorted] those [vessels destined] for this port [and arrived at Port Royal on 11 February 1815, as recorded on page 17.]') (Note: The following warships were protecting the other vessels: 'Swiftsure of 74 guns, Capt. Adderley; Araxes frigate, of 36 guns, Capt. Bligh, Serapis store-ship, of 44 guns, Mr. Lloyd master, Buffalo store-ship, of 20 guns, Mr. Anderson, master, Redwing brig, of 18 guns, Capt. Young, Drake sloop of war, of 16 guns, Capt. Grant, and the Forward brig, of 14 guns, Capt. Banks.')

Swiftsure became a receiving ship in 1819, In September 1844, she heeled over and sank at Portchester, Hampshire. In November 1844, she was in use as a target ship by HMS Excellent. She was broken up in 1845.

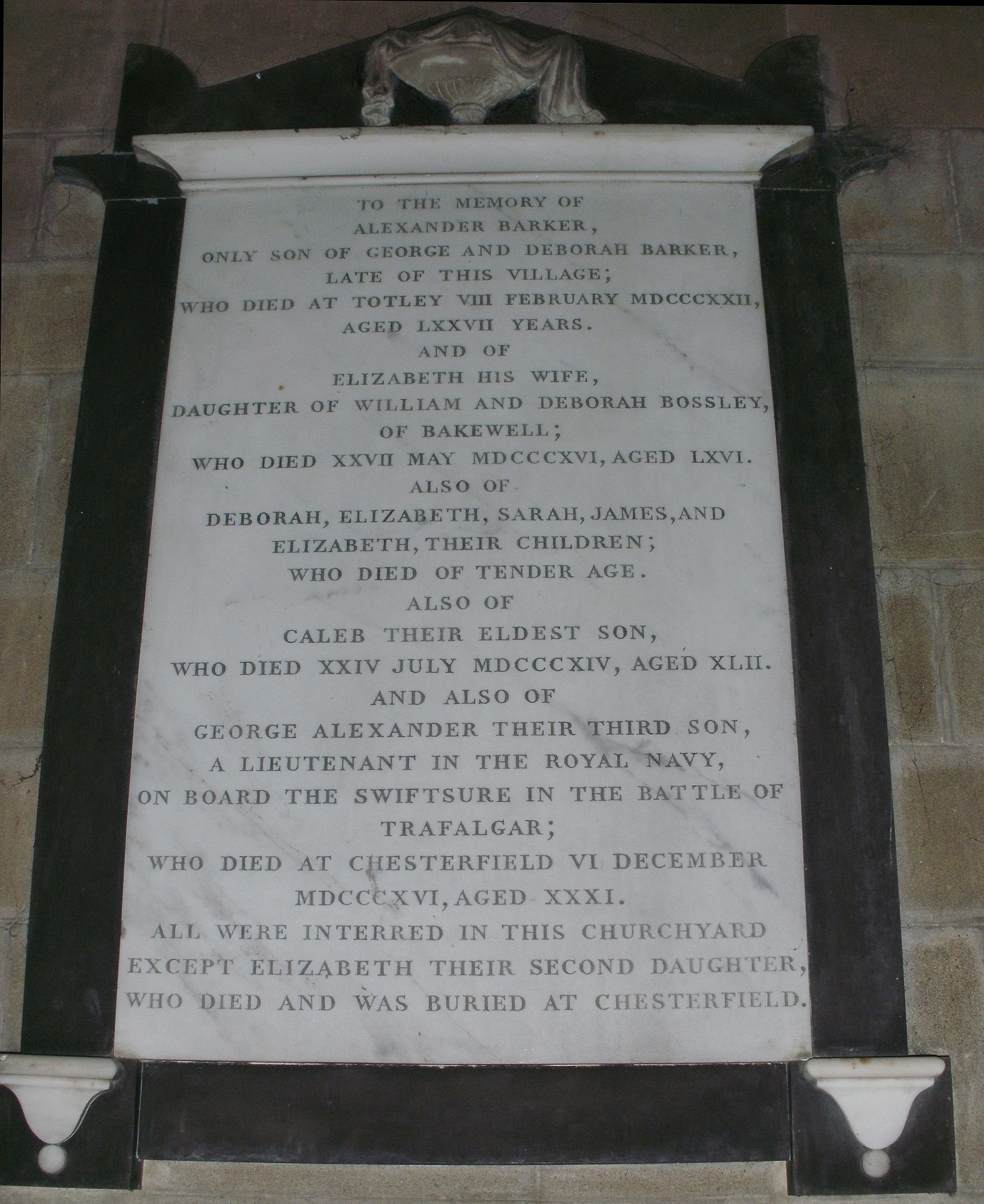
Barker family memorial in St Peter's Church, Edensor, with reference to HMS Swiftsure and Trafalgar
