= HMS Mermaid (1761) =

Frigate of the Royal Navy

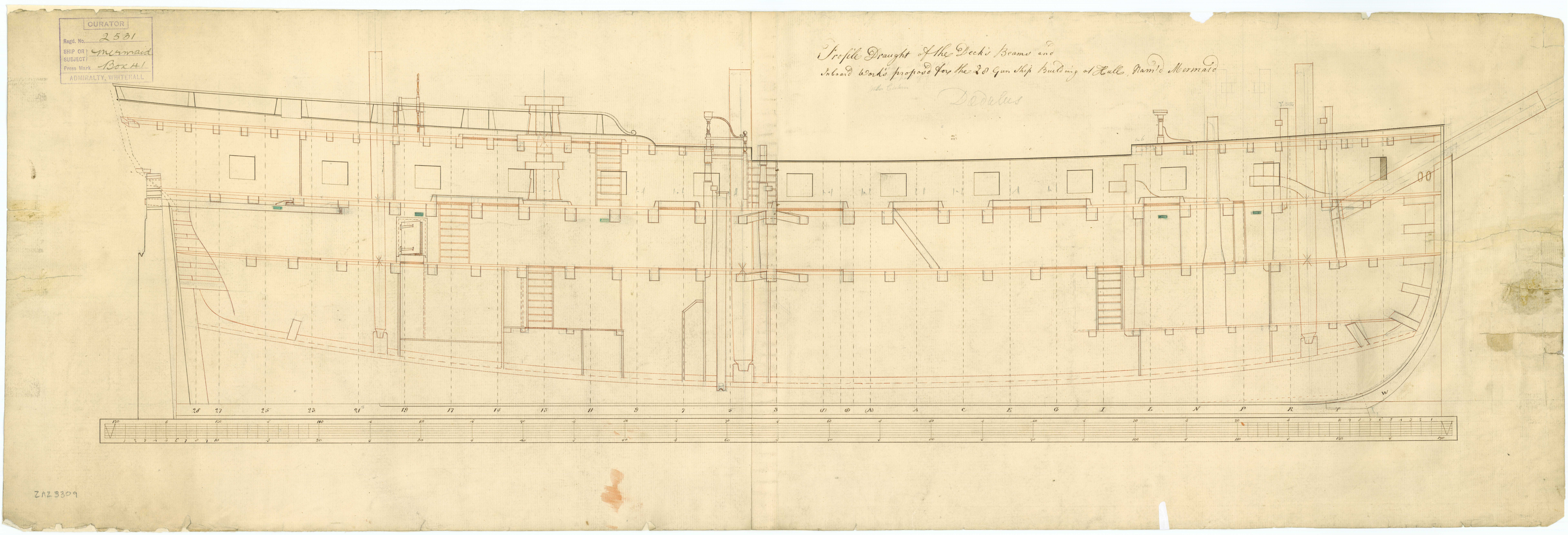
- Drawing depicting the inboard profile plan as proposed and approved for the Mermaid, 1760

History

Great Britain
- Name: HMS Mermaid
- Ordered: 24 April 1760
- Builder: Hugh Blaydes, Hull
- Laid down: 27 May 1760
- Launched: 6 May 1761
- Completed: September 1761
- Commissioned: April 1761
- Fate: Driven ashore 8 July 1778 to avoid capture

General characteristics
- Class & type: Mermaid-class frigate
- Tons burthen: 613 85/94 (bm)
- Length: 124 ft 0 in (37.80 m) (gundeck); 102 ft 8.25 in (31.2992 m) (keel)
- Beam: 33 ft 6.375 in (10.22033 m)
- Depth of hold: 11 ft (3.4 m)
- Sail plan: Full-rigged ship
- Complement: 200 officers and men
- Armament: 28 guns comprising; Upper deck: 24 × 9-pounder cannon; Quarterdeck 4 × 3-pounder cannon; 12 swivels.

HMS Mermaid was a Mermaid-class sixth-rate frigate of the Royal Navy. She was first commissioned in April 1761 under Captain George Watson and built in Blaydes Yard in Kingston-Upon-Hull.

HMS Mermaid served in the North America squadron based at Boston till ordered home by Rear Admiral John Montagu in November 1771. Sometime in May, 1777 she captured "Elizabeth". On 5 June, 1777 she recaptured "2 Betsys" off Cape Negro, Nova Scotia. On 30 July, 1777 she captured "Hero" off Cape Sable. On 29 August, 1777 she recaptured "Fanny" off the Seal Islands. Sometime in September, 1777 recaptured "Sophia" off Barrington. On 1 March, 1778 she captured schooner Rebecca off St. Georges Bank. On 8 July 1778, the 50 gun Sagittaire and the 64-gun Fantasque forced HMS Mermaid to beach herself at Cape Henlopen.
