= HMS Hussar (1763) =

Frigate of the Royal Navy

Coordinates: 41.170°N 71.762°W

- Hussar

History

Great Britain
- Name: HMS Hussar
- Ordered: 30 January 1762
- Builder: Thomas Inwood, Rotherhithe, England
- Laid down: 1 April 1762
- Launched: 26 August 1763
- Completed: 7 November 1763 at Deptford Dockyard
- Commissioned: August 1763
- Fate: Ran aground in New York, 23 November 1780

General characteristics
- Class & type: Mermaid-class frigate
- Tons burthen: 627 64/94 (bm)
- Length: 124 ft 4 in (37.9 m) (gundeck); 103 ft 8 1/2 in (31.6 m) (keel)
- Beam: 33 ft 10 3/8 in (10.3 m)
- Depth of hold: 11 ft (3.4 m)
- Sail plan: Full-rigged ship
- Complement: 200
- Armament: Upper deck: 24 × 9-pounder (4 kg) cannon, QD: 4 × 3-pounder (1.4 kg) cannon + 12 swivel guns.

HMS Hussar was a sixth-rate frigate of the Royal Navy, built in England in 1761–63. She was a 28-gun ship of the Mermaid class, designed by Sir Thomas Slade. She was wrecked at New York in 1780.

In early 2013, a cannon from Hussar was discovered stored in a building in New York's Central Park, still loaded with gunpowder and shot.

== Career ==
Hussar was commissioned in August 1763 under Captain James Smith, and sent for her commission cruising in the vicinity of Cape Clear. By 1767 she was commanded by Captain Hyde Parker. She continued to serve off North America between 1768 and 1771, before paying off into ordinary in March 1771. After being repaired and refitted at Woolwich from 1774 to 1777, she was recommissioned in July 1777 under Captain Elliott Salter. In later life, she was part of the British fleet in North America. During the American Revolution, Hussar carried dispatches on the North American station.

Hussar captured the Spanish ship of the line Nuestra Señora del Buen Confeso (armed en flute), on 20 November 1779.

By mid-1780, the British position in New York was precarious as a French army had joined forces with General George Washington's troops north of the city.

== Loss ==
When Admiral Sir George Brydges Rodney took his twenty ships of the line south in November, it was decided that the army's payroll would be moved to the anchorage at Gardiners Bay on eastern Long Island. On 23 November 1780, against his pilot's better judgment, Hussar's captain, Charles Pole, decided to sail from the East River through the treacherous waters of Hell Gate between Randall's Island and Astoria, Queens (on Long Island). Just before reaching Long Island Sound, Hussar was swept onto Pot Rock and began sinking. Pole was unable to run her aground, and she sank in 16 fathoms (96 ft; 29 m) of water.

The minutes of the Royal Navy's court martial into the loss of the frigate (record held at the National Maritime Museum, Greenwich) make no mention of any payroll money or other special cargo aboard. The document appears to be little more than an administrative formality. It suggests that whatever valuables were aboard Hussar had been off-loaded by the time of her accident.

== Salvage attempts ==
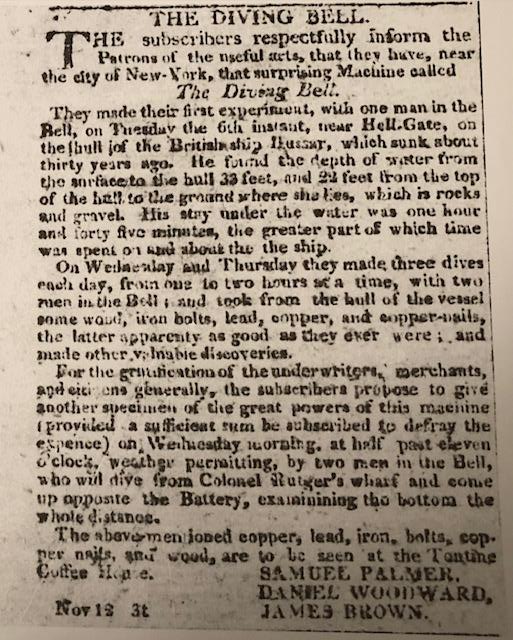
Notice by owners of the diving bell" about the search for the wreck of HMS Hussar near Hell Gate begun on 6 November 1810

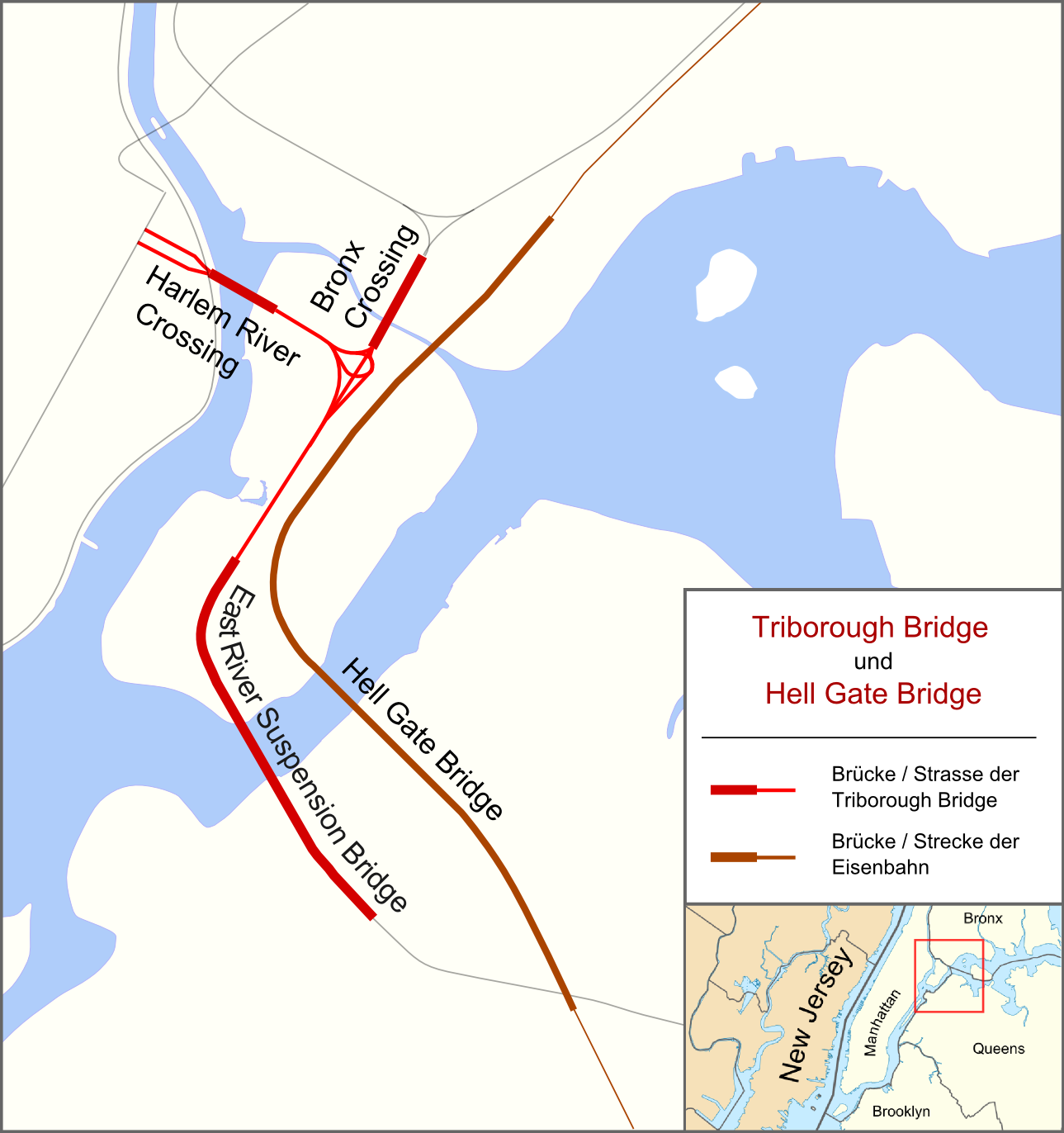
Triborough-Hell Gate Bridge

Although the British immediately denied there was any gold aboard the ship, and despite the difficulty of diving in the waters of Hell Gate, reports of $2 to $4 million in gold were the catalyst that prompted many salvage efforts over the next 150 years. On 15 June 1811, Commodore Isaac Chauncey wrote to the secretary of the Navy to confirm that the wreck of HMS Hussar had been located and a gunboat from the Brooklyn Navy Yard was assisting in the search. He noted, "A Mr. Samuel Palmer the proprietor of a Diving Bell has been making some attempt to raise Guns and Ballast of the Huzzar[sic] a British 20 gun ship that sank in the Hell Gate during the Revolutionary War and which is said to have had a large sum of money on board. Mr. Palmer has ascertained the exact position and has taken some copper from her Bottom, and part of the painter and braces from the rudder."

This continued even after the U.S. Army Corps of Engineers eased the passage through the East River by blowing "the worst features of Hell Gate straight back to hell" with 56,000 pounds (25 t) of dynamite in 1876. Hussar's remains, if any survive, are now believed to lie beneath landfill in the Bronx.

On 11 January 2013, preservationists with the Central Park Conservancy in New York were removing rust from a cannon from Hussar when they discovered it still contained gunpowder, wadding, and a cannonball. Police were called and bomb disposal staff eventually removed about 1.8 pounds of active black gunpowder from the cannon, which they disposed of at a gun range. "We silenced British cannon fire in 1776 and we don't want to hear it again in Central Park," the New York Police Department said in a statement.

== In popular culture ==
In Kim Stanley Robinson's 2017 science fiction novel New York 2140, a sub-plot centers on an attempt to recover two chests with gold from the wreck of HMS Hussar that lies buried under a submerged parking lot in the former Bronx.
