= HMS Boreas (1774) =

Frigate of the Royal Navy

History

Great Britain
- Name: HMS Boreas
- Ordered: 25 December 1770
- Builder: Hugh Blaydes & Mr Hodgson, Hull
- Laid down: May 1771
- Launched: 23 August 1774
- Completed: 23 October 1775 at Chatham Dockyard
- Commissioned: August 1775
- Fate: Sold to break up at Sheerness in May 1802

General characteristics
- Class & type: Modified Mermaid-class frigate
- Tons burthen: 626 48/94 (bm)
- Length: 124 ft 6 in (37.95 m) (gundeck); 103 ft 11 in (31.67 m) (keel)
- Beam: 33 ft 8 in (10.26 m)
- Depth: 10 ft 11.5 in (3.340 m)
- Sail plan: Full-rigged ship
- Complement: 200 officers and men
- Armament: Upper deck: 24 × 9-pounder guns; QD: 4 × 3-pounder guns; 12 swivel guns

HMS Boreas was a modified Mermaid-class sixth-rate frigate of the Royal Navy. She was first commissioned in August 1775 under Captain Charles Thompson. She was built at Blaydes Yard in Hull to a design by Sir Thomas Slade at a cost of £10,000. She was fitted out at Chatham Docks.

On an unknown date, probably between 4-20 November, 1776, she captured "Williamsburg Packet". On 13 December she captured schooner "Ipswich". On 15 December, 1776 she captured schooners "Polly" and "John". On 20 December she captured schooner "Theo and Ann". On 25 December she captured sloop "Polly". Sometime between late December, 1776 and early March, 1777 she captured sloops "Will" and "Hope". On 16 March she captured schooners "Cannon", "Farmer", "Juliet", and "Happy-Return". On 20 March she captured schooner "Mary" and probably sloop "Betsy". She captured an unknown sloop and brig probably between 14-19 May, 1777, and an unknown schooner on 22 May. She captured brig "Dublin" between 22 May and 27 June.

In 1778 she underwent a refit in Plymouth having a copper bottom fitted at a cost of £5500.

In July 1779 she saw action in the Battle of Grenada under command of Captain Thompson.

On 31 August 1779 Boreas, still under Captain Thompson, captured the French corvette Compas, of eighteen 6-pounder guns, which was carrying a cargo of sugar. (Note: Compas had been launched on 12 September 1776. She had originally been intended as a training corvette for 40 students at the École de la Marine at Havre, but it closed in March, before she was launched. The Royal Navy did not take her into service. French sources report that she was armed with eighteen 8-pounder guns.) Compas, which was armed en flute, put up resistance for about 20 minutes, with the result that she suffered nine men killed and wounded before she struck. Boreas was part of a squadron under the command of Rear Admiral of the Red Hyde Parker on the Jamaica station.

Horatio Nelson was Senior Naval Officer of the Leeward Islands from 1784 to 1787 in Boreas.

Boreas was used as a slop ship from 1797 until her sale in 1802.

== Footnotes ==
Notes

Citations
