= Laurent Barbé =

French shipbuilder

- Born: c. 1696; France
- Died: March 21, 1764; Copenhagen
- Occupations: Shipbuilder, naval architect
- Years active: c. 1740–1747 (Royal Danish Navy)
- Employer: Danish Naval Construction Commission
- Known for: Chief Designer and Master Shipbuilder for the Royal Danish Navy

Laurent Barbé was a French shipbuilder born about 1696. He came to the attention of Frederik Danneskiold-Samsøe, (Note: Count Frederik Danneskiold-Samsøe was appointed head of the Danish navy in 1735) when in 1739 the newly formed Danish Naval Construction Commission was seeking a replacement chief designer and shipbuilder. Barbé enjoyed Danneskiold's patronage and protection for some six years but fell out of favour when Danneskiold retired from the Construction Commission.

== Personal life ==
Nothing is known of Laurent Barbé's personal or professional life before Copenhagen. He married Brigitte Agnes Mariane Schenck, some thirty years his junior, the daughter of a senior officer in royal lifeguard regiment.

== Shipbuilder to the Royal Danish Navy ==
The design of Barbé's first ship of the line for Denmark (which would become Elephanten 1741) was produced by Barbé as part of a competition between him and another French shipbuilder, du Chemin, for the position of the new master shipbuilder to the Danish fleet. Barbé's employment dated from 6 May 1740, by which time construction of the new ship had already started. Despite concerns over the quality of its keel, Elephanten proved to be an excellent ship and the technical drawings set the standard for future work.

He was reticent about revealing his construction methods to the Danish Naval Construction Commission which caused some problems but as a protege of Danneskiold-Samsøe he survived in his position. Barbé also designed a frigate, a slightly smaller ship of the line (of 70 guns) and a royal yacht. Elephanten was judged to be an excellent ship when it entered service, and the technical drawings became a standard for future similar ships. He also had failures and his small frigate (which may have been a brigantine -see below) HDMS Æroe was a very mediocre sailer. In 1743, he obtained various French ship designs, which were built at Copenhagen and in 1744 was commissioned to design and build a galley - which proved a good sailing vessel but responded poorly when rowing.

== Sacked ==
With the departure of Danneskiold, Count of Samsøe in November 1746, Barbé lost all support in the shipyard, had disagreements with the Construction Commission and was retired on a pension of 500 rdl in 1747. His collection of design drawings was seized on his dismissal and put into the Danish admiralty's collection for future use. (Note: The article at Danish Wikipedia da:Laurent Barbé implies that Barbé had to be brought back on a consultancy basis) Barbé continued to live in Copenhagen until his death, in straitened circumstances, on 21 March 1764.

HDMS Elephanten (1773) is credited to the design of Barbé, although she was launched 26 years after Barbé's departure. (The plans available on line, for ornamentation drawn in 1772 and receiving royal approval, are signed Håndværksmester/Bygmester: Møllerup).

== Barbé's ships ==
The Royal Danish Navy's database (Note: The Royal Danish Naval Museum website carries the caveat that not all entries have been fully confirmed from the Danish Archives. Entries in Skibregister may have coded references - see here for the coded sources.) attributes the following ships designs to Barbé. Note that many of them were built after Barbé left his position in the Danish shipyards, indeed one after his death:

- Christiansøe 1741 frigate
- Cronprindsen 1756 ship of the line
- Dannemark 1757 ship of the line
- Docqven 1747 frigate
- Dronning Juliana Maria 1752 ship of the line
- Elephanten 1741 ship of the line
- Elephanten 1773 ship of the line
- Jaegersborg 1745 boat/galley
- Nellebladet 1746 ship of the line
- Neptunus 1750 ship of the line
- Samsøe (22) 1746 frigate
- Sælland (Sjælland) 1750 ship of the line
- Tre Croner (Tre Kroner) 1742 ship of the line

Recorded elsewhere

- Ærøe 1744 brigantine of 10 guns and a crew of 53
