= Mermaid-class frigate =

Class overview
- Built: 1760-1763, 1771-1776
- Completed: 6

General characteristics
- Tons burthen: 612 72/94 (first batch as designed); 617 22/94 (second batch as designed)
- Length: 124 ft 0 in (38 m) (gundeck); 102 ft 8.125 in (31 m) (keel - first batch); 103 ft 4.75 in (32 m) (keel - second batch)
- Beam: 33 ft 6 in (10 m)
- Draught: 11 ft (3 m)
- Sail plan: Full-rigged ship
- Complement: 200
- Armament: UD: 24 × 9-pounder guns; QD: 4 × 3-pounder guns; From 1780; UD: 24 × 9-pounder guns; QD 4 × 6-pounder guns and 18-pounder carronades; FC: 2 × 18-pounder carronades

The Mermaid-class frigates were a group of six 28-gun sailing frigates of the sixth rate designed in 1760 by Sir Thomas Slade, based on the scaled-down lines of HMS Aurora (originally a French prize, Abénaquise, which had been captured in 1757).

The contract for the prototype was agreed on 12 May 1760, for a ship to be launched within twelve months, and her name was assigned as Mermaid on 28 October 1760. The contract for the second ship was agreed on 10 March 1762, for a ship to be launched within thirteen months, and the contract for the third ship was agreed on 2 April 1762, for a ship to be launched within fourteen months; both names were assigned on 30 April 1763.

Some ten years after the design was first produced, it was re-used for a second batch of three ships which were ordered on Christmas Day, 1770. While the design differences from the first batch were minor (the keel was a few inches longer), the second batch were normally designated the Modified Mermaid class.

== Ships in class ==
First batch

- Mermaid
  - Ordered: 24 April 1760
  - Built by: Hugh Blaydes, Hull.
  - Keel laid: 27 May 1760
  - Launched: 6 May 1761
  - Completed: September 1761 at the builder's yard.
  - Fate: Run ashore to avoid capture by the French 8 July 1778.
- Hussar
  - Ordered: 30 January 1762
  - Built by: Thomas Inwood, Rotherhithe.
  - Keel laid: 1 April 1762
  - Launched: 26 August 1763
  - Completed: 7 November 1763 at Deptford Dockyard.
  - Fate: Wrecked in Hell's Gate passage, New York, on 24 November 1779.
- Solebay
  - Ordered 30 January 1762
  - Built by: Thomas Airey & Company, Newcastle.
  - Keel laid: 10 May 1762
  - Launched: 9 September 1763
  - Completed: December 1763 at the builder's yard, then 2 January to 15 March 1764 at Sheerness Dockyard.
  - Fate: Wrecked off Nevis Island and burnt to avoid capture 25 January 1782.

Second batch

- Greyhound
  - Ordered: 25 December 1770
  - Built by: Henry Adams, Bucklers Hard.
  - Keel laid: February 1771
  - Launched: 20 July 1773
  - Completed: October 1775 to 9 January 1776 at Portsmouth Dockyard.
  - Fate: Wrecked off Deal 16 August 1781.
- Triton
  - Ordered: 25 December 1770
  - Built by: Henry Adams, Bucklers Hard.
  - Keel laid: February 1771
  - Launched: 1 October 1773
  - Completed: 15 October 1773 to 4 November 1775 at Portsmouth Dockyard.
  - Fate: Taken to pieces at Deptford Dockyard in January 1796.
- Boreas
  - Ordered: 25 December 1770
  - Built by: Hugh Blaydes & Hodgson, Hull.
  - Keel laid: May 1771
  - Launched: 23 August 1774
  - Completed: 13 September 1774 to 23 October 1775 at Chatham Dockyard.
  - Fate: Sold at Sheerness Dockyard May 1802.
