= Tiger (1773 ship) =

History

Great Britain
- Name: Tiger
- Owner: 1776:J.H. Scheider; 1781:Jonathon Hall
- Builder: Maryland
- Launched: 1773
- Fate: Last listed 1796

General characteristics
- Tons burthen: 1773: 200 (bm); 1779:227, or 230, or 250 (bm)
- Armament: 1781:2 × 3-pounder guns; 1795:4 × 4-pounder guns

Tiger was launched at Maryland in 1773. She appears in England in 1776 without any sign that she was a prize. She was lengthened in 1779, which increased her burthen. Between 1785 and 1788 she made three voyages as a whaler. She then returned to trade and is last listed in 1796.

== Career ==
Tiger appears in Lloyd's Register in 1776 with Jonathan Hall, master, J.H. Schneider, owner, and trade Dublin-London, changing to London-St Petersburg.

Year	Master	Owner	Trade	Notes
1780	J.Hall; M.Pile	J. Hall	London–Antigua	Lengthened 1779
1785	T. Wire	J. Hall	London-Southern Fisheries	Repairs 1784

Whaling voyage #1 (1785-1786: Captain T. Weir (or Wyer) sailed in 1785 for the Brazil Banks and Africa. (Note: The Brazil Banks are the edge of the continental shelf south of latitude 16°S and to the east of the coast of South America.) In April 1786 she was at the Brazils. On 25 July she reported having taken 25 "fish" (whales). However she had not seen land for nine months and the crew was sick. She returned to England on 11 August with 35 tuns of sperm oil.

Whaling voyage #2 (1786-1787): Captain J. Weir sailed from England on 20 September 1786 for the Brazil Banks. Tiger was reported to have been off Trinidad on 4 October, "all well". By 2 April 1787 she had 45 tons of sperm oil. She returned on 4 June 1787 with 41 tuns of sperm oil.

Whaling voyage #3 (1787-1788): Captain Holden Barton sailed from England on 7 September 1787, bound for the Brazil Banks. By December Tiger was at the Brazils. By 1 December she had 50 barrels of right whale oil. She returned to England on 29 May 1788 with 25 tuns of whale oil and 20 cwt of "bone" (baleen).

Year	Master	Owner	Trade	Notes
1790	Loadman	J. Hall	London–Stockholm	Repairs in 1788
1795	H. Gilson; W. Denham	J. Hall	Liverpool-Bremmen	Good repair 1790
