= HMS Greyhound (1773) =

Frigate of the Royal Navy

History

Great Britain
- Ordered: 25 December 1770
- Builder: Henry Adams, Bucklers Hard
- Laid down: February 1771
- Launched: 20 July 1773
- Completed: 9 January 1776 at Portsmouth Dockyard
- Commissioned: October 1775
- Fate: Wrecked off Deal 9 June 1781

General characteristics
- Class & type: Modified Mermaid-class frigate
- Tons burthen: 61783/94 (bm)
- Length: 124 ft 2 in (37.85 m) (gundeck); 102 ft 8.875 in (31.31503 m) (keel)
- Beam: 33 ft 7.5 in (10.249 m)
- Depth of hold: 11 ft (3.4 m)
- Sail plan: Full-rigged ship
- Complement: 200 officers and men
- Armament: 28 guns comprising; Upper deck: 24 × 9 pdr (4.1 kg) guns; Quarterdeck: 4 × 3 pdr (1.4 kg) guns; 12 swivel guns

HMS Greyhound was a modified Royal Navy Mermaid-class sixth-rate frigate. She was first commissioned in October 1775 under Captain Archibald Dickson.

== Service ==
On 15 November, 1777 she captured snow "Scipio" at (41°30′N 64°40′W). On 10 January, 1778 captured American brig "Industry" off the West Indies. On 15 May 1778 captured an American sloop off Cape Henry. On 16 May captured American schooner Dolphin off Cape Charles. On 18 May captured American schooner Herbert. On 19 May captured sloop Fame off Cape Charles.
