= HDMS Elephanten (1741) =

Ship of the line

History

Denmark
- Name: Elephanten
- Namesake: The Order of the Elephant
- Builder: Laurent Barbé
- Laid down: 1740
- Launched: 6 May 1741
- In service: 1741
- Out of service: 1760
- Home port: Copenhagen

General characteristics
- Type: Ship of the line
- Tons burthen: 1177 Lst
- Length: 169 ft (52 m)
- Beam: 45 ft (14 m)
- Draught: 21 ft (6.4 m) (aft)
- Sail plan: Full-rigged ship
- Complement: 668
- Armament: 70 × 24-pdr guns

HDMS Elephanten (Note: A number of technical drawings can be seen on-line at by clicking "vis") was an 18th-century ship-of-the-line in the Dano-Norwegian navy that was built at Nyholmen in Copenhagen by Laurent Barbé and ornamentation by J.Wiedewelt.

A model of this ship's figurehead can be seen at the Royal Danish Naval Museum and also a model of the stern galleries in full colour.

== Design and construction ==
The design of the ship-of-the-line which would become Elephanten was produced by Barbé as part of a competition between him and another French shipbuilder, du Chemin, before the appointment of the new master shipbuilder to the Danish fleet. Barbé's employment dated from 6 May 1740, by which time construction of the new ship had already started! Even during construction, Elephanten gave cause for concern about the structure of the keel - which was put down to faulty construction rather than faulty design. In the end, Elephanten proved to be an excellent ship and the technical drawings set the standard for future work. Elephanten's sistership, Nellebladet (1746), was built to the same design plan.

== Fate ==
Elephanten was decommissioned in 1760 and broken up the same year.

== Citations ==
- Nielsen, E Dansk Militærhistorie Website "Major Danish Warships Built at the Holmen Shipyard 1692-1744" (in English)
- Skibregister (den sorte registrand) for Record Cards of Danish Ships (in Danish)
- Royal Danish Naval Museum list of ships Details, drawings and models for some of the named ships are available here.
- Hans Christian Bjerg: Laurent Barbe in Dansk Biografisk Leksikon, 3rd. edition, Gyldendal 1979–84. (accessed 11 May 2019) (in Danish)
- ALVAMA A list of ships in the Danish navy in 1743. Found in the Dutch Archives.
