= HMS Surprize (1746) =

Ship of the line of the Royal Navy

History

Great Britain
- Name: HMS Surprize
- Ordered: 11 August 1744
- Builder: James Wyatt & John Major, Bucklers Hard
- Laid down: September 1745
- Launched: 27 January 1746
- Commissioned: January 1746
- Fate: Sold to be broken up on 17 July 1770

General characteristics
- Class & type: sixth rate
- Tons burthen: 508 tons bm
- Length: 112 ft 6 in (34.3 m) (gundeck); 91 ft 10 in (28.0 m) (keel)
- Beam: 32 ft 3 in (9.8 m)
- Depth of hold: 11 ft 1 in (3.4 m)
- Propulsion: Sails
- Sail plan: Full-rigged ship
- Armament: 24 guns comprising 22 × 9-pounders (20 on upper deck, 2 on lower deck) and 2 × 3-pounders (on quarterdeck).

HMS Surprize was a 24-gun sixth rate ship of the Royal Navy. She was built to the 1741 revised specifications of the 1719 Establishment by James Wyatt and John Major at Bucklers Hard on the Beaulieu River in Hampshire and launched on 27 January 1745.

She was broken up in 1770.
