= Buckler's Hard =

Village in Hampshire, England

Coordinates: 50°47′57″N 1°25′21″W

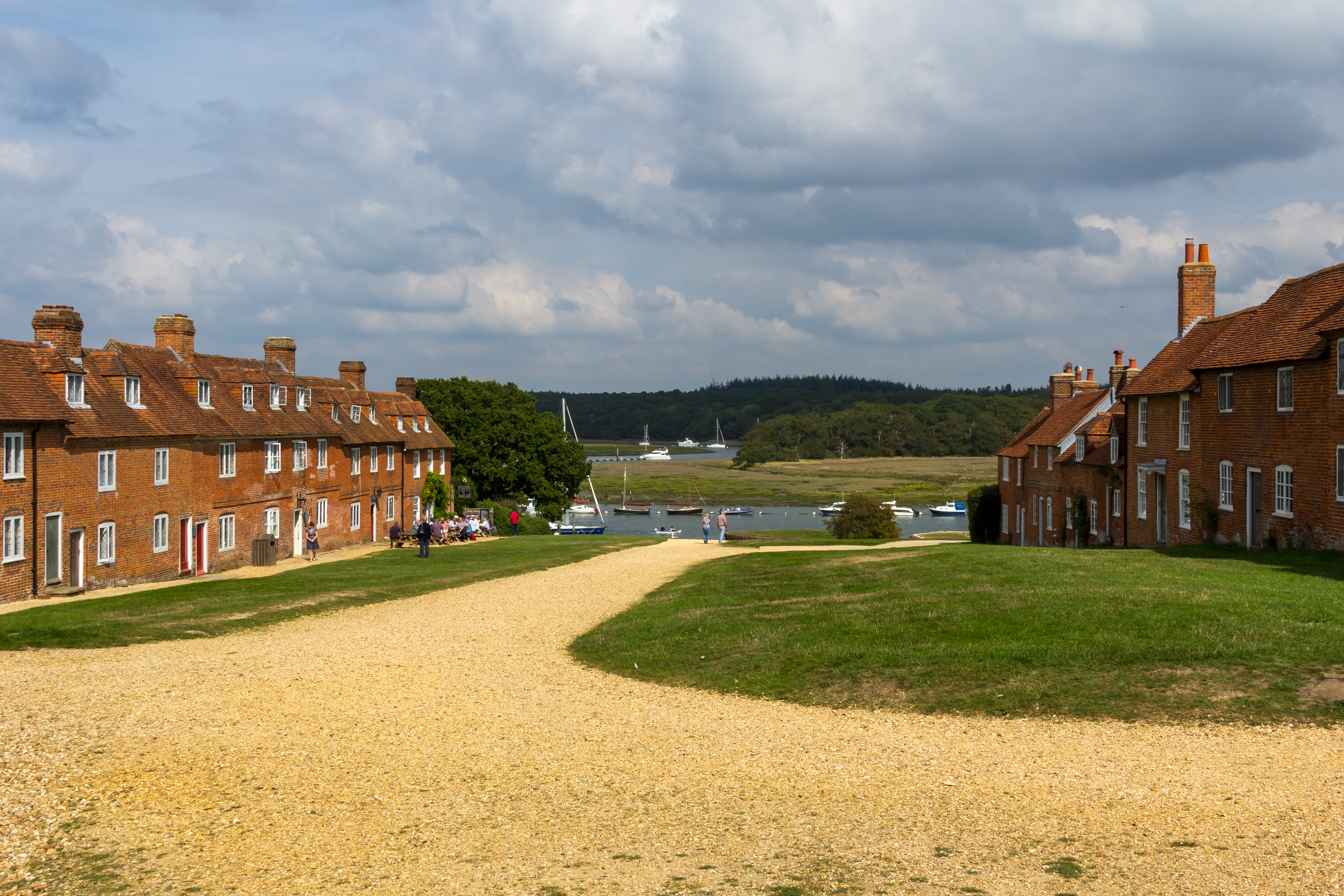

- Location within Hampshire
- OS grid reference: SU408001
- Civil parish: Beaulieu
- District: New Forest
- Shire county: Hampshire
- Region: South East
- Country: England
- Sovereign state: United Kingdom
- Post town: Brockenhurst
- Postcode district: SO42
- Dialling code: 01592
- Police: Hampshire and Isle of Wight
- Fire: Hampshire and Isle of Wight
- Ambulance: South Central
- UK Parliament: New Forest East

Buckler's Hard is a hamlet in the civil parish of Beaulieu, in the New Forest district of Hampshire county, England, on the banks of the Beaulieu River. With its two rows of Georgian cottages running down to the river, Buckler's Hard is part of the 9,000-acre (3,600-hectare) Beaulieu Estate. The hamlet is 2 1/2 miles (4 kilometres) south of the village Beaulieu.

== History ==
Buckler's Hard, originally called Montagu Town, was built by the second Duke of Montagu, and was intended to be a free port for trade with the West Indies. Its geography also favoured the development of shipbuilding, as the hamlet possessed access to a sheltered but navigable waterway with gravel banks capable of supporting slipways for vessel construction and launch. Timber for hulls was also readily available from the surrounding New Forest.

=== Shipbuilding ===
Shipbuilding at Buckler's Hard commenced in the early eighteenth century. A private shipyard adjoining the hamlet was established by James Wyatt, a local entrepreneur and timber merchant from Hythe on Southampton Water. Wyatt & Co. won a contract to build the Navy ship HMS Surprise in 1744, and subsequently another, HMS Scorpion, at Buckler's Hard. Henry Adams, a master shipwright, was sent from Deptford Dockyard to Buckler's Hard in 1744 by the Admiralty to oversee the building of these ships by Wyatt & Co. After the completion of the initial ships by Wyatt, Buckler's Hard grew to national prominence under Henry Adams and won subsequent Royal Navy contracts.

Over the following sixty years, Adams would supervise the building of 43 Royal Navy ships at Buckler's Hard, including three that fought at the Battle of Trafalgar in 1805: HMS Euryalus, HMS Swiftsure, and HMS Agamemnon. In 1783, Henry Adams was succeeded by his son, Balthazar Adams.

Shipbuilding at Buckler's Hard declined in the nineteenth century.

=== 20th century to present ===
During World War II, the village was used to build motor torpedo boats, and the river was a base for hundreds of landing craft for the Normandy invasion, Operation Overlord.

Buckler's Hard was where Sir Francis Chichester began and finished his solo voyage around the world in the Gipsy Moth IV.

== Economy ==
Today the main activity in the hamlet is tourism, with a small maritime museum, and a modern yachting marina.

Master Builder's House, now a hotel, was the home of Henry Adams, a master shipbuilder in the 18th century .

== See also ==
- Hard (nautical)
