= Battle of Port Louis =

1799 battle of the East Indies theatre of the French Revolutionary Wars

- Part of the East Indies theatre of the French Revolutionary Wars
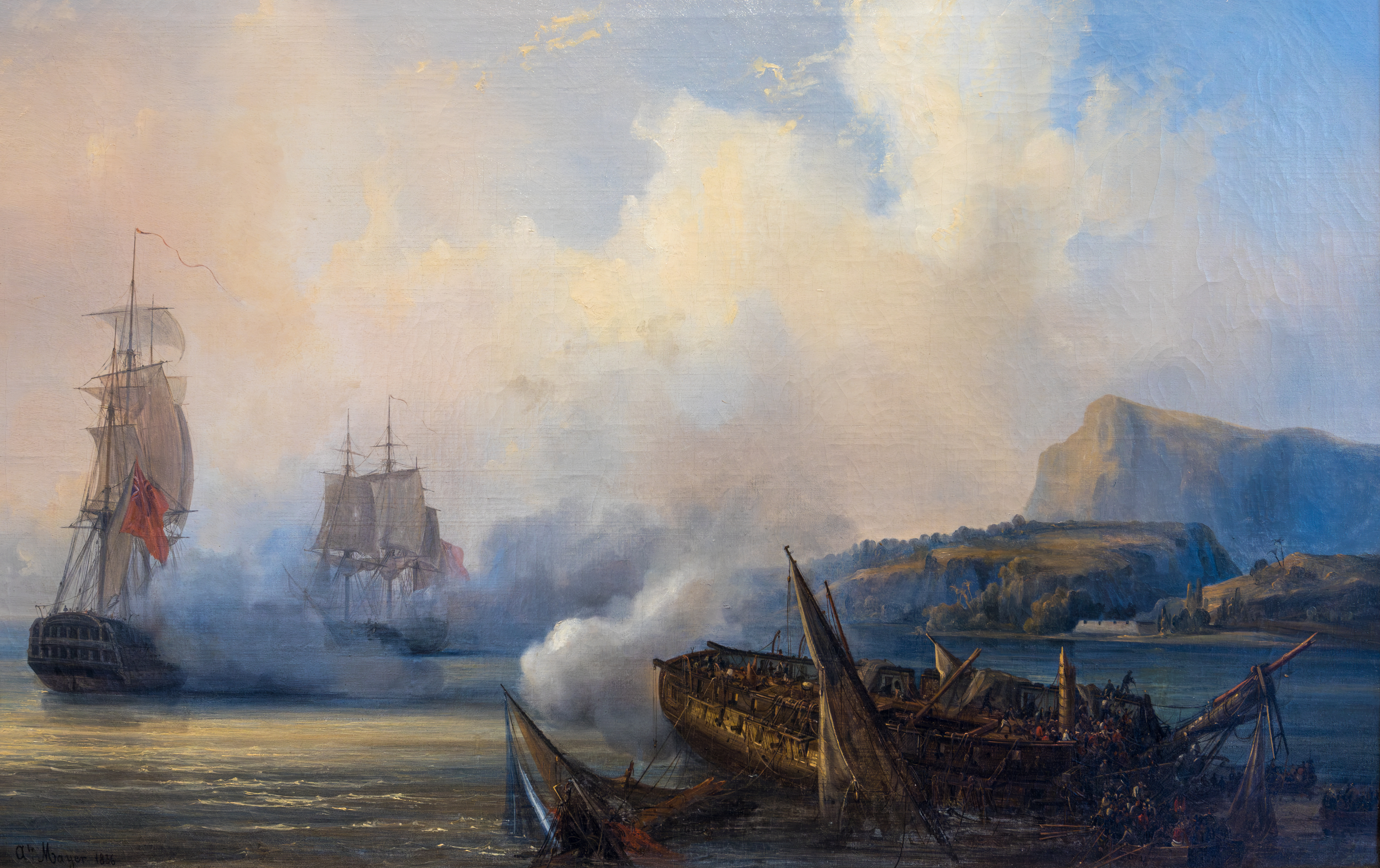
- Painting of the battle by Auguste Mayer
Date	11 December 1799
Location	Off Port Louis, Indian Ocean
Result	British victory

Belligerents
Great Britain	France

Commanders and leaders
John Osborn; William Hotham	Jean-Marthe-Adrien l'Hermite (surrendered)

Strength
2 ships of the line	1 frigate

Casualties and losses
None	1 frigate destroyed

The Battle of Port Louis was a minor naval engagement of the French Revolutionary Wars, fought on 11 December 1799 at the mouth of the Tombeau River near Port Louis on the French Indian Ocean colony of Isle de France, later known as Mauritius. Preneuse had originally been part of a powerful squadron of six frigates sent to the Indian Ocean in 1796 under the command of Counter-admiral Pierre César Charles de Sercey, but the squadron dispersed in 1798 and by the summer of 1799 Preneuse was the only significant French warship remaining in the region.

The battle was the culmination of a three-month raiding cruise by the 40-gun French frigate Preneuse, commanded by Frigate Captain Jean-Marthe-Adrien l'Hermite. Ordered to raid British commerce in the Mozambique Channel, l'Hermite's cruise had been eventful, with an inconclusive encounter with a squadron of small British warships in Algoa Bay on 20 September and an engagement with the 50-gun HMS Jupiter during heavy weather on 9–11 October.

Returning to Isle de France in December, l'Hermite steered for Port Louis but was intercepted by the British blockade squadron, comprising the 74-gun ship of the line HMS Tremendous under Captain John Osborn and the 50-gun HMS Adamant under Captain William Hotham. Unable to reach safety, l'Hermite evaded pursuit long enough to drive Preneuse onto a beach at the mouth of the Tombeau. After a brief exchange of fire the wrecked frigate was surrendered and British boarding parties in ship's boats rowed inshore to Preneuse, removed the survivors and burnt the remains. Watching from the shore as the last of his command burned on the beach, Sercey subsequently retired from military service.

== Background ==
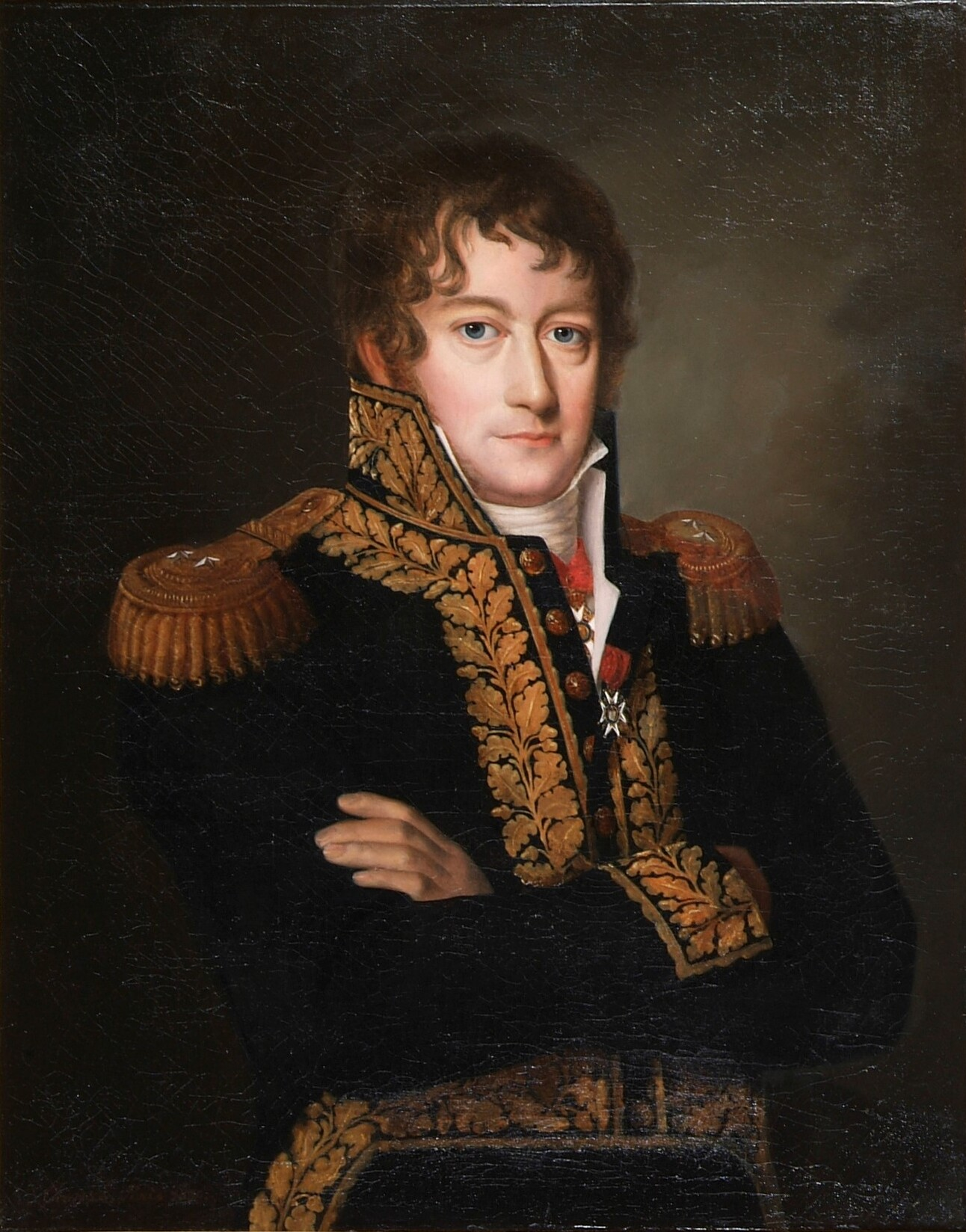
Jean-Marthe-Adrien l'Hermite, the French commander at the battle

In 1796 British Royal Navy dominance in the East Indies during the French Revolutionary Wars was challenged by the arrival of a squadron of six French Navy frigates, commanded by Counter-admiral Pierre César Charles de Sercey. Among these ships was the new 40-gun frigate Preneuse, commanded by Frigate Captain Jean-Marthe-Adrien l'Hermite. Preneuse had not sailed from France with Sercey, instead passing independently through the Atlantic and uniting with the squadron at Port Louis on Isle de France. Sercey deployed his squadron to the Dutch East Indies, but suffered frustration at the action of 9 September 1796 and the Bali Strait Incident of January 1797 and subsequently returned to the base at Port Louis. There the squadron began to fracture, with a succession of ships sent back to France or detached on independent missions.

Preneuse separated in March 1798, carrying messages of support and 86 military volunteers for the Tipu Sultan of the Kingdom of Mysore, an enemy of the British in Southern India who sought to form an alliance with France. L'Hermite's instructions emphasised subtlety in the operation, but on 20 April he attacked the British port of Tellicherry and seized the East Indiaman merchant ships Woodcot and Raymond. This alerted the British to Preneuse's mission and although the reinforcements were landed safely at Mangalore on 24 April, diplomatic relations between the British and Mysore collapsed, leading to the Fourth Anglo-Mysore War the following year in which Tipu Sultan was killed and his kingdom absorbed into British India.

L'Hermite then sailed to rejoin Sercey and the corvette Brûle-Gueule at Batavia in the Dutch East Indies for a planned junction with an allied Spanish squadron at Manila. This combined force then attacked an East India Company convoy gathering in the Pearl River in January 1799, but in the ensuing Macau Incident they were driven off by the Royal Navy escort squadron. Dispirited, Sercey returned westwards to Isle de France, narrowly avoiding an unequal battle with a large British squadron blockading the port. On arrival he discovered that Preneuse and Brûle-Gueule were the only ships remaining of his original command, the others having returned to France or been lost in battle.

== Battle ==
=== Algoa Bay ===
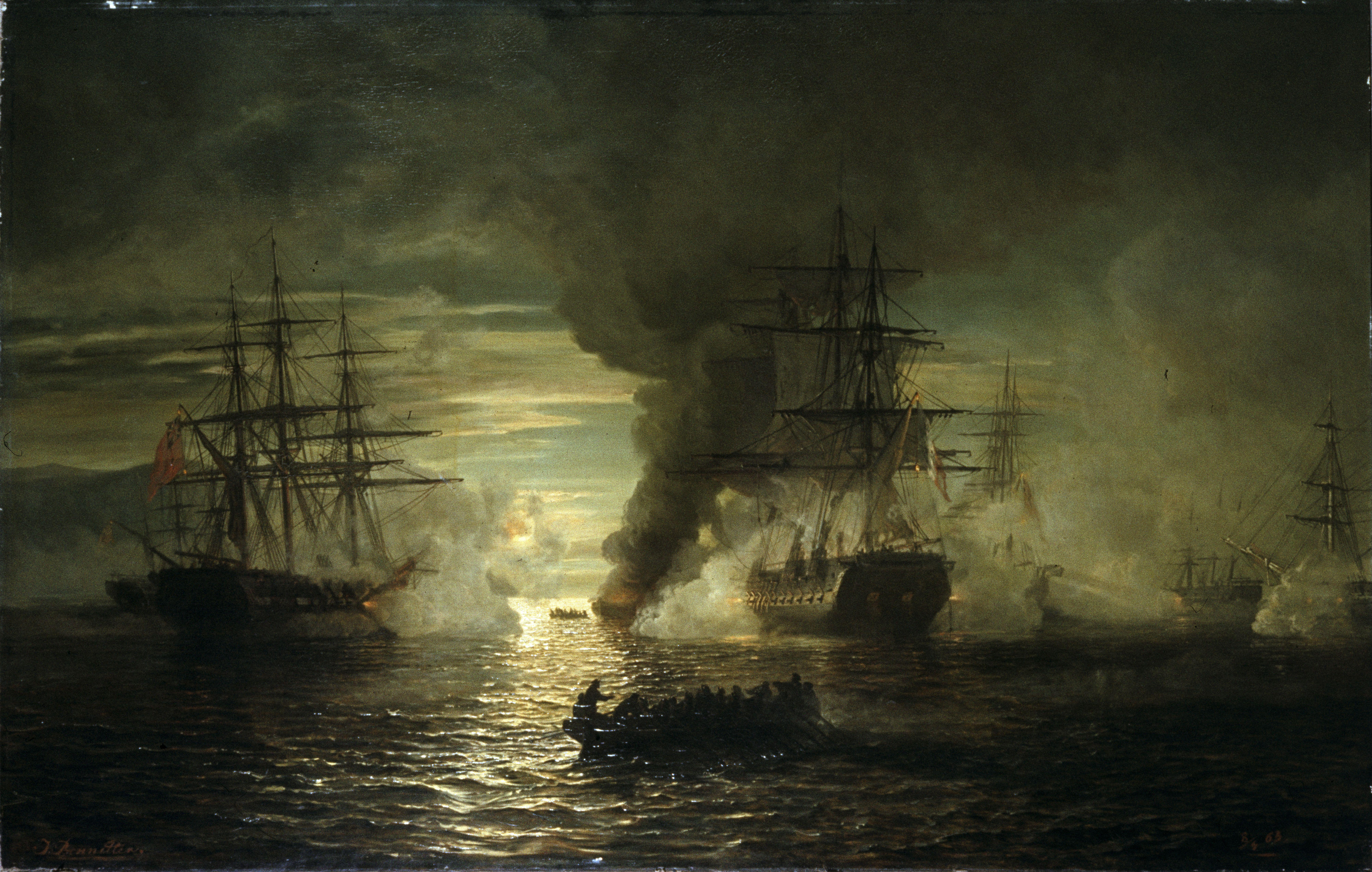
1864 painting of the battle in Algoa Bay

In September 1799 Sercey dispersed his remaining ships. Brûle-Gueule was sent back to France on 26 September carrying condemned political prisoners; the corvette was eventually wrecked on the Pointe du Raz with heavy loss of life. Preneuse was ordered to operate against British trade off the coast of Southeast Africa, sailing from Port Louis on 4 August. L'Hermite focused his efforts on the Mozambique Channel and the approaches to the British Cape Colony and on 20 September encountered a squadron anchored in Algoa Bay comprising the 24-gun naval storeship HMS Camel, the 16-gun HMS Rattlesnake (1791) and the schooner Surprise, the former ships lying with their masts and rigging removed. This force was supporting an expeditionary army under General Francis Dundas fighting the Third Xhosa War. Camel was laden with military supplies but neither ship was prepared for battle, with a 30 of Camel's sailors and 15 from Rattlesnake trapped on shore by the surf.

L'Hermite approached the anchored ships at 18:00, flying false Danish colours, and anchored nearby. A ship's boat from Camel approached the new arrival, rapidly realising that Preneuse was a hostile frigate and returning to their ship. Lieutenant William Fothergill, the most senior officer with the convoy, fired warning shots close to the frigate, which l'Hermite ignored. Both British ships then prepared for action. At 20:30, Preneuse began to approach Rattlesnake and Fothergill opened fire immediately, joined by Camel. L'Hermite returned fire, focusing its broadside on Camel. By midnight Camel had taken several shot in the hull causing widespread flooding, and the crew ceased firing to man the pumps. L'Hermite apparently believed that Camel had abandoned the fight and he switched fire towards Rattlesnake, the engagement continuing until 03:30 at which point l'Hermite slipped his anchor and pulled out of range. Remaining in the bay until 10:00 before standing out to sea. British losses were two killed and twelve wounded, both Camel and Rattlesnake badly damaged. It was later reported in French sources that l'Hermite believed the schooner Surprise to be a well armed naval brig, prompting his withdrawal. Preneuse's loss in the action was around 40 killed and wounded, and the frigate was reported to be badly damaged; messages to this effect were hastily sent to the commander at the Cape, Captain George Losack who sent the 50-gun HMS Jupiter in pursuit.

On 9 October after spending the night with the convoy in Algoa Bay, Jupiter discovered Preneuse at 34°41′S 27°54′E and gave chase. The sea was turbulent due to a strong gale from the northwest and the chase continued into the evening before Captain William Granger was able to fire ranging shot at the French ship. L'Hermite responded with his sternchasers. Granger rapidly gained on the damaged Preneuse but the state of the sea made it impossible for him to safely open his lower deck gunports and a long-range duel continued at high speed throughout the night and much of the following two days. At 14:00 on 10 October Granger was finally close enough to bring l'Hermite to action, but found that with his 24-pounder guns unusable he was restricted to his upper deck 12-pounder guns, which were no match for l'Hermite's main battery. As a result, the rigging on Jupiter was rapidly shot away and the British ship fell back for urgent repairs and Preneuse was able to take the opportunity to escape. Granger returned to Table Bay on 16 October.

=== Chase off Port Louis ===
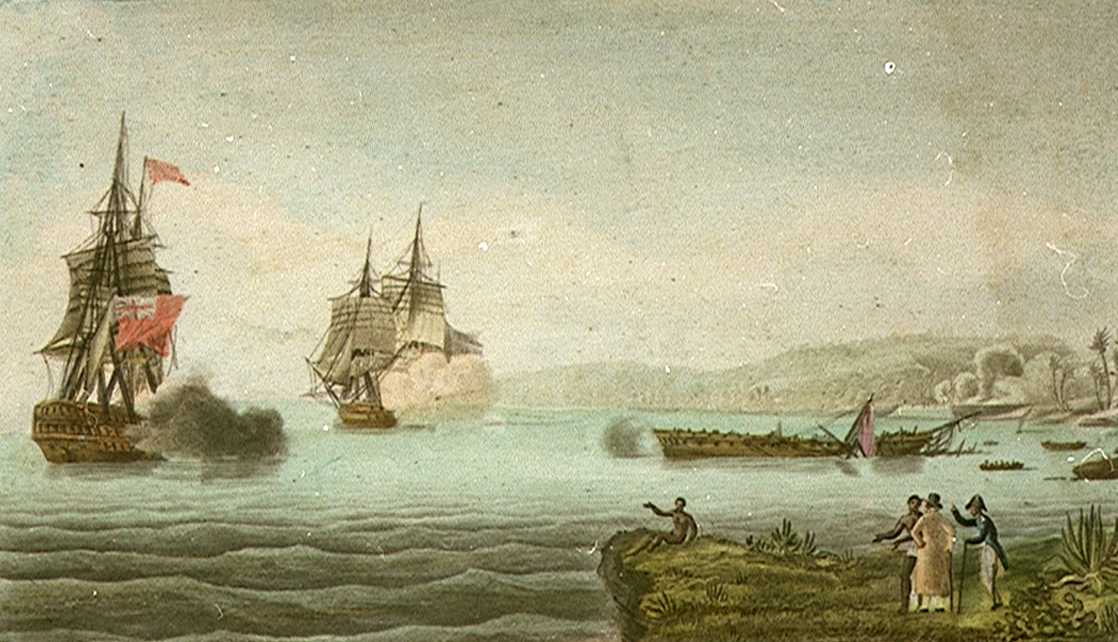
Aquatint of the destruction of Preneuse

L'Hermite had little subsequent success, and Preneuse returned to Port Louis in early December 1799. The entrance to the port was blockaded by the 74-gun ship of the line HMS Tremendous under Captain John Osborn and the 50-gun HMS Adamant under Captain William Hotham. These ships had been sent specifically to intercept Preneuse, arriving at Port Louis on 7 December and successfully intercepting the merchant French vessels Benjamin and Bienfait and the Spanish Nuestra Señora del Carmen. Four days later they sighted the approaching frigate and chased it northeast, Adamant pressing so close that l'Hermite could not escape and was forced to drive the frigate on shore at the mouth of the Tombeau River within range of a large shore battery.

At 15:00, l'Hermite ordered the masts on Preneuse to be cut away and the frigate and battery then opened fire on Adamant, which was carefully sailing through the coastal shoals in an effort to engage the beached French ship. For more than two hours Hotham's ship worked its way inshore until at 17:30 it was well positioned to open fire, unleashing its broadside on the wrecked Preneuse. By 17:45 it was clear that further resistance was futile and l'Hermite struck his colours. Preneuse had surrendered, but was likely damaged beyond repair.

Hotham and Osborn discussed the situation and determined to destroy the wreck to deny it to the French. To this end, three cutters were gathered and a boarding party under Lieutenant Edward Grey sent in to attack Preneuse at 20:00. This party came under fire from the batteries but was able to successfully access the battered French frigate at 21:00, finding that only the officers and a handful of sailors remained, the others having been given the opportunity to escape to the shore in boats rather than become prisoners of war. Among the captives was l'Hermite, who was permitted to bring his personal baggage with him before he was brought to the British squadron as a prisoner. Grey then set the wrecked ship alight before returning to Adamant, having executed his orders without losing a single man.

== Aftermath ==
As Preneuse had gone ashore near Port Louis, Sercey had come to observe the engagement and therefore witnessed the destruction of the last of his squadron of 1796. A commander without a command he subsequently took ship back to France and there retired from his commission, later returning to his family and settling on Isle de France. The action temporarily left the French with no naval forces in the East Indies at all, although raiding cruises by privateers still posed a considerable threat to the British Indian Ocean trade routes. The only subsequent reinforcement to arrive in the region during the war was the frigate Chiffonne was intercepted and captured at the Battle of Mahé shortly after arrival in 1801, although substantial reinforcements did reach Isle de France before the outbreak of the Napoleonic Wars in 1803.

L'Hermite subsequently came under criticism from historians for his failure to inflict greater damage on the light force in Algoa Bay: William James described it as "a somewhat discreditable action". Granger was also heavily criticised for his performance in the action on 11 October: William Laird Clowes considered that "No explanation of the Jupiter's failure can be given", while James wrote of the action with Jupiter that "Undoubtedly it was a cause of triumph to Captain L'Hermite and well calculated to wipe away the disgrace incurred by Preneuse at Algoa bay".
