= Jean-Marthe-Adrien l'Hermite =

French Navy officer (1766–1826)

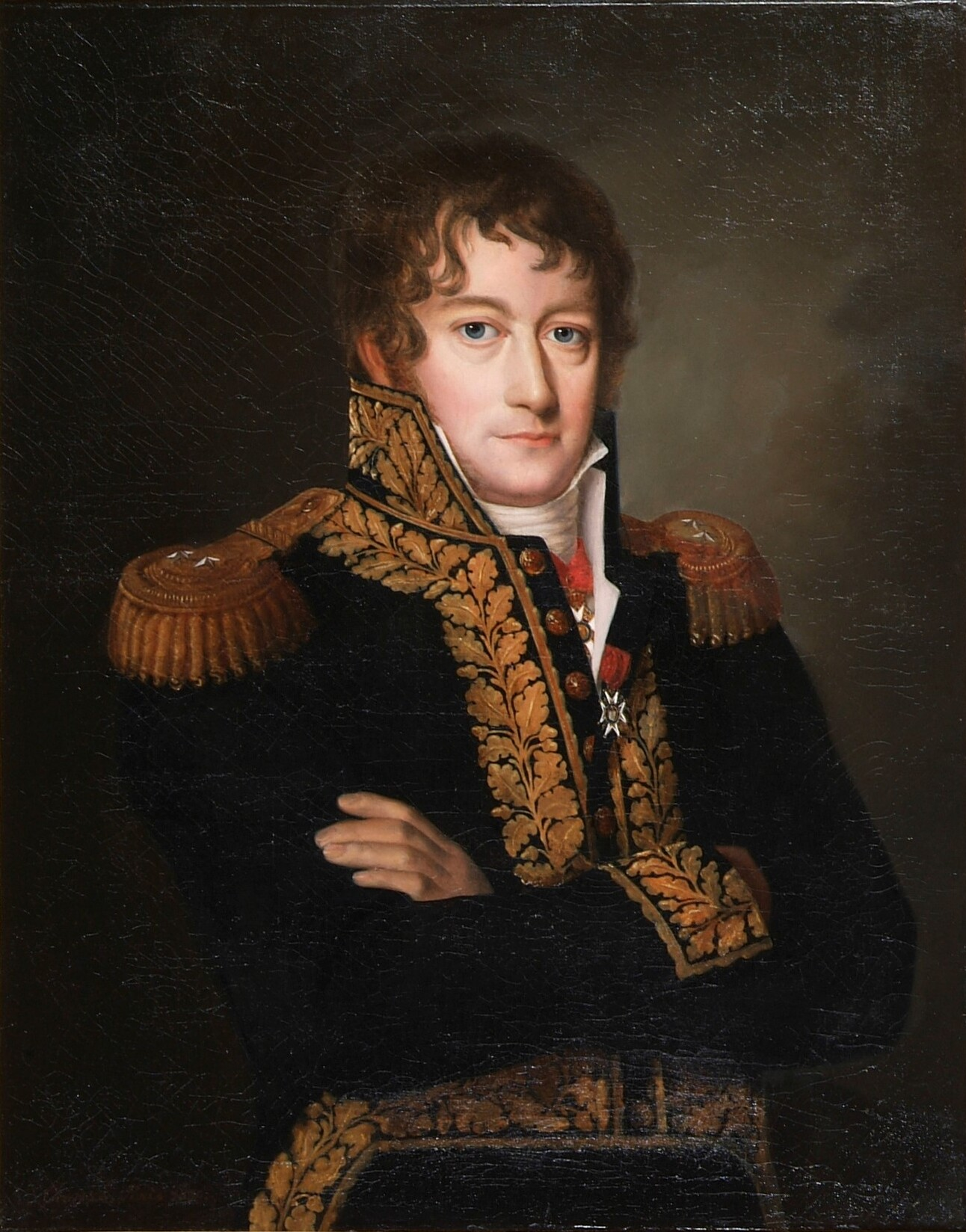
- Portrait of l'Hermite
- Born: 29 September 1766; Coutances, Manche
- Died: 28 August 1826 (aged 59); Plessis-Picquet
- Military career
- Allegiance: French First Republic; First French Empire; Kingdom of France
- Branch: French Navy; French Imperial Navy
- Service years: 1780–1816
- Rank: Counter admiral
- Commands: Seine; Preneuse; Impétueux; Alexandre; Vengeur; Régulus; Ville de Varsovie; Ville de Marseille
- Conflicts: American Revolutionary War; Battle of the Chesapeake; Siege of Brimstone Hill; French Revolutionary Wars; Glorious First of June; Action of 9 September 1796 (WIA); Battle of Port Louis (surrendered); Napoleonic Wars; L'Hermite's expedition
- Awards: Baron of the Empire; Legion of Honour; Order of Saint Louis; Name engraved on the Arc de Triomphe

Counter-Admiral Jean-Marthe-Adrien l'Hermite (Note: First name also written "Jean-Matthieu-Adrien", and family name also written "Lhermitte") (29 September 1766 — 28 August 1826) was a French Navy officer best known for his involvement in the Glorious First of June and L'Hermite's expedition during the Atlantic campaign of 1806.

== Biography ==
=== Early career ===
L'Hermite was born to the family of a counselor to the Bailiwick and Présidial of Cotentin. He joined the Navy in 1780, at the age of 14 as a novice on the coast guard cutter Pilote-des-Indes, cruising the English Channel, and on which he distinguished himself during the capture of a British privateer off Chausey.

In 1780, he joined the Northumberland as a volunteer and took part in the Battle of the Chesapeake and siege of Brimstone Hill during the American Revolutionary War. In 1784, when many French naval ships were put in the reserve, L'Hermite left the Navy and worked as first officer on the fishing ships Modeste and Surveillante off Newfoundland. In 1787, with Castries's reform of the Navy, l'Hermite took a commission as a sub-lieutenant on the Achille, and later of a number of smaller units that escorted merchantmen. One of these was the Goėland, which was escorting the fishing fleet from Granville to Newfoundland.

=== French Revolution ===
==== English Channel and Northern Sea ====
In February 1793, when war broke out against England, L'Hermite was first officer on the frigate Résolue, and he engaged in commerce raiding in the Channel and off the Atlantic coast of France. Promoted to lieutenant in August 1793, he received command of the Tamise, recently captured from the British by the frigate division to which Résolue belonged. After extensive tests, Tamise conducted two patrols in the Channel, capturing over 60 prizes, and was then attached to Montagne, the flagship of the Brest squadron. As such, she took part in the Glorious First of June, in which she ferried orders from the admiral to other ships.

In 1794, l'Hermite took command of a frigate squadron bound to raid commerce off Ireland, with his flag on the frigate Seine. The squadron captured over 80 of small vessels, including on 23 August HMS Hound, a 16-gun sloop returning from Jamaica. (Note: Troude (vol.2 p.383 incorrectly identifies Jean-Marthe-Adrien l'Hermite with his homonym Pierre Lhermite.) L'Hermitte then led the frigates Seine and Galathée and a corvette to Christiansand, visiting several harbours of the coast of Norway to capture British merchantmen that had fled there. Trapped by cold and disrepair, his ships were forced to spend the winter of 1794-1795 there, where sickness weakened their crews. He returned to France with three prizes, though a storm wrecked Galathée off Penmarch.

==== Indian Ocean ====
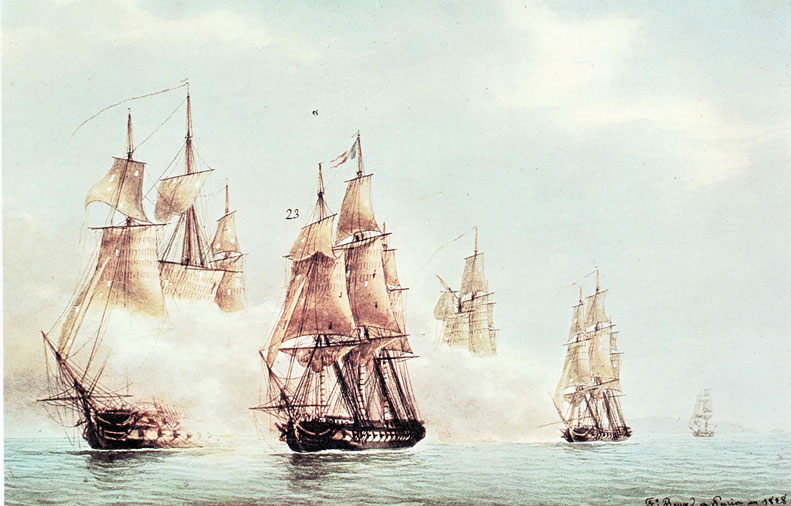
The action of 9 September 1796, where l'Hermite was wounded

From February 1796, L'Hermite captained the frigate Vertu in a squadron led by Admiral Pierre César Charles de Sercey, bound for Isle de France. He took part in a number of small actions, and was wounded in the action of 9 September 1796. In 1798, he took command of the 46-gun frigate Preneuse. He was tasked to ferry ambassadors sent by Tipu Sultan to Isle de France to request help against Britain. Spotting two British East Indiamen off Thalassery, L'Hermite decided to attack. He captured them after a one-hour fight, and in spite of a lightning striking Preneuse's main mast. When they arrived at Surabaya, the crew of Preneuse mutinied when L'Hermite decided to send the captured flags to Admiral Sercey. Subsequently, five men were court-martialed, found guilty of mutiny, and executed by firing squad.

L'Hermite then set out for a three-month patrol in the Chinese seas with Preneuse and Brûle-Gueule with Ignacio María de Álava. In 1799, upon their return to Isle de France, the ships were blockaded by a British squadron of three ships of the line, a frigate and a brig. The French took refuge in Rivière Noire District and sent seven guns ashore; three weeks later, the British squadron departed. On 4 September, Preneuse engaged a British frigate squadron that she had approached in the fog and mistaken for merchant vessels, escaping after a furious fight that cost her 40 casualties. In October 1799, off Cape of Good Hope, Preneuse was spotted and chased by the 54-gun HMS Jupiter, which was cruising to intercept her. After a 22-hour chase, L'Hermite engaged Jupiter and managed to manoeuver into a favourable position from which he sent her a raking broadside at pistol range, forcing her to sail back to Cape Town to avoid boarding. His ship damaged and with 80 of his men killed or wounded, L'Hermite returned to Isle de France.

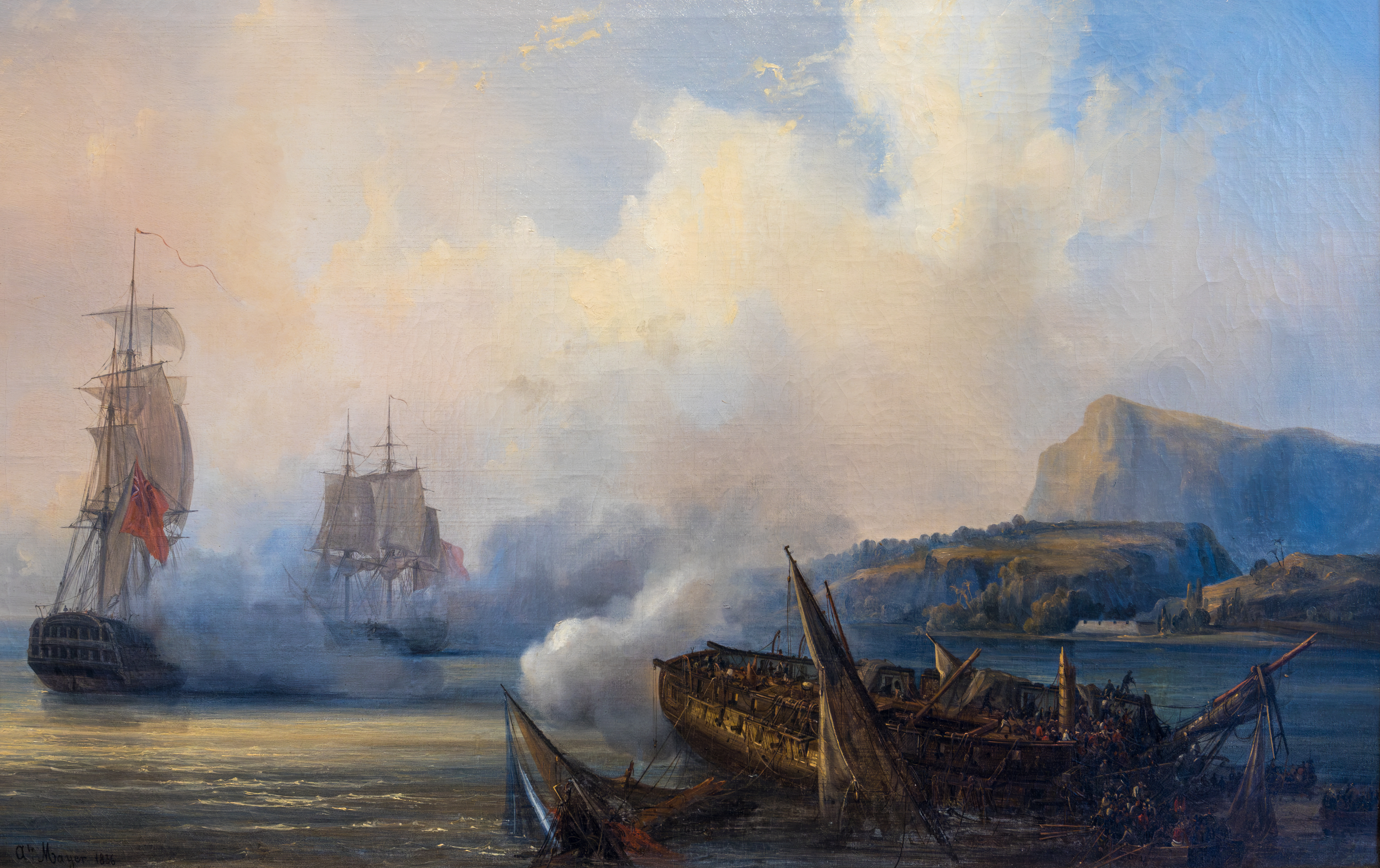
The Battle of Port Louis, at which l'Hermite was captured

On her return to Isle de France, Preneuse encountered the 74-gun Tremendous in front of Port-Louis on 11 December. As she attempted to escape by sailing in shallow waters, the 50-gun HMS Adamant cut her retreat. Erratic winds then grounded Preneuse on a coral bank, and she came under fire from the two ships of the line, able to return fire only from her stern chasers. L'Hermite sent his sick and wounded ashore and was taken prisoner by Commodore William Hotham, who boarded Preneuse and burnt her. Ailing, L'Hermite was received with extreme courtesy by Hotham, and release on parole with his staff a few days later. He returned to Isle de France a hero, the population celebrating him and a 15-shot salute being fired in his honour.

=== Career during the First Empire ===
L'Hermite returned to France in October 1801, where he was received by Bonaparte, called him "the Brave" and promoted him to ship-of-of-the-line captain. He took command of the 74-gun Impétueux to ferry her from Lorient to Brest, then of the 80-gun Alexandre, and eventually of the 120-gun Vengeur, as flag officer of Admiral Laurent Jean François Truguet. L'Hermitte's rising star came to a halt, however, when Truguet was dismissed after speaking against the rise of the Empire, and for one year l'Hermite was left without a command. He was appointed Officer of the Legion of Honour at the founding of the Order in late 1805.

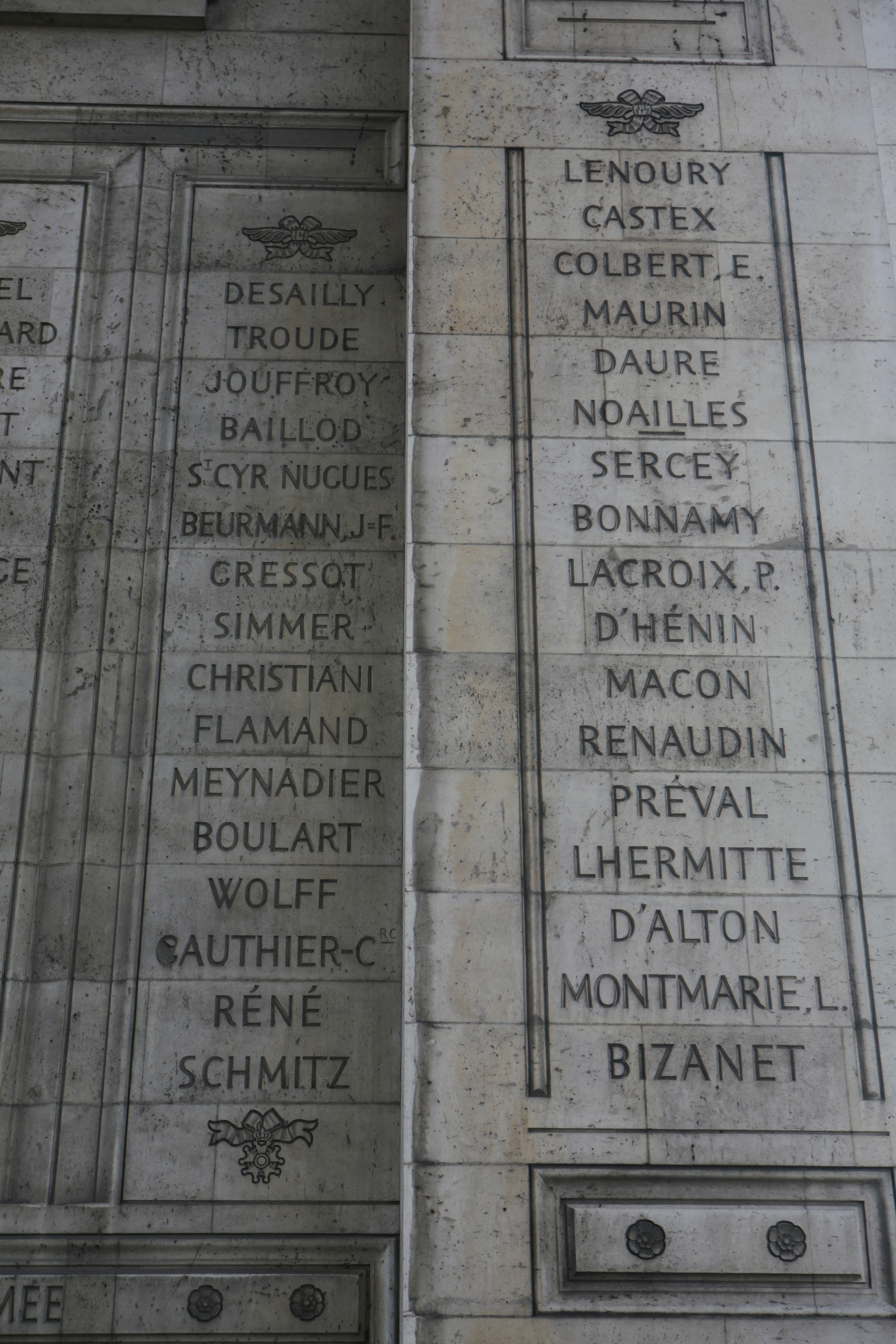
L'Hermite's name on the Arc de Triomphe

In 1805, l'Hermite took command of a squadron tasked with raiding commerce in the Atlantic and in the Caribbean, with his flag on the Régulus; the squadron further comprised two frigates and two fireships. The squadron departed Lorient on 31 October 1805 and cruised off the Azores, Cape Verde, the coast of Africa up to Benin, crossed the Atlantic to Brazil, and sailed towards the Caribbean. On 6 January 1806 they captured HMS Favourite. In August 1806, a storm dispersed the squadron and L'Hermite lost his frigates, and he was forced back to Brest by an epidemic of scurvy. In the Iroise Sea, he encountered four British ships of the line blockading Brest, but managed to slip past them and enter Brest harbour on 2 September 1806. Having captured approximately 50 ships and goods worth around 10 million francs during his 11-month campaign, L'Hermite was promoted to counter admiral and made a Baron of the Empire.

In October 1808, l'Hermite was put in command of the Rochefort squadron, raising his flag on Ville de Varsovie. He also served as a rapporteur in the council of war convened after the Battle of the Basque Roads. By mid-February, his failing health had forced him to resign his command and he never again occupied a command at sea. In 1811, L'Hermite was appointed as the maritime prefect of Toulon. In 1812, he briefly commanded the Mediterranean Squadron, which did not sail at the time. His chronic illness forced him to rely on captain Christy-Pallière, who supervised the harbour, to relieve him. After the Bourbon Restoration in France in 1814, l'Hermite commanded the Ville de Marseille. Louis XVIII sent him to pick up the Duke of Orléans and his family in Palermo. This task earned l'Hermite the cross of the Order of Saint Louis. During the Hundred Days, L'Hermite declared himself in favour of the King, which caused his immediate dismissal. L'Hermite retired in 1816 with the honorary rank of vice-admiral, and was appointed Knight of the Order of Saint Louis.

== Honours ==
- Baron of the Empire
- Legion of Honour
- Order of Saint Louis
- Name engraved on the Arc de Triomphe
- The steamer aviso L'Hermitte was named in his honour

== Portraits ==
Langlois de Sézanne painted two portraits, representing L'Hermite and his wife, which the family gave to the museum of Coutances. A smaller portrait by Fanish, which shows l'Hermite in 1793, is also on display there.

== See also ==
- Pierre Lhermite

== Notes and references ==
=== Bibliography ===
- Di Ré, André (2006). La Tamise, une frégate légère dans la campagne de Prairial (in French). Chronique d'Histoire Maritime n°61, Société Française d'Histoire Maritime.
- Garneray, Louis (1985). Voyages, Aventures et Combats (in French). Vol. 1. Phébus.
- Levot, Prosper (1866). Les gloires maritimes de la France: notices biographiques sur les plus célèbres marins (in French). Bertrand.
- Mullié, Charles (1852). "l'Hermitte (Marthe-Adrien, baron)" . Biographie des célébrités militaires des armées de terre et de mer de 1789 à 1850 (in French). Paris: Poignavant et Compagnie.
- Six, Georges (1934). "l'Hermitte (Jean-Mathieu-Adrien, baron)". Dictionnaire biographique des généraux et amiraux français de la Révolution et de l'Empire: 1792–1814 (in French). Vol. 2. Paris: Librairie Historique et Nobilaire. p. 121.
- Thomazi, Auguste (1978). Les Marins de Napoléon (in French). Tallandier.
- Troude, Onésime-Joachim (1867). Batailles navales de la France (in French). Vol. 2. Challamel ainé.
- Troude, Onésime-Joachim (1867). Batailles navales de la France (in French). Vol. 3. Challamel ainé.
- Van Hille, Jean-Marc (2011) Dictionnaire des marins francs-maçons, Gens de mer et professions connexes aux XVIIIe, XIXe et XXe siècles: Travaux de la loge maritime de recherche La Pérouse - Kronos N° 56. (Editions L'Harmattan). ISBN 978-2-901952-81-7

=== External links ===
- Jean-Marthe-Adrien l'Hermite, sailingnavies.com
