= William Hotham (Royal Navy officer, born 1772) =

Royal Navy officer (1772–1848)

Admiral Sir William Hotham GCB
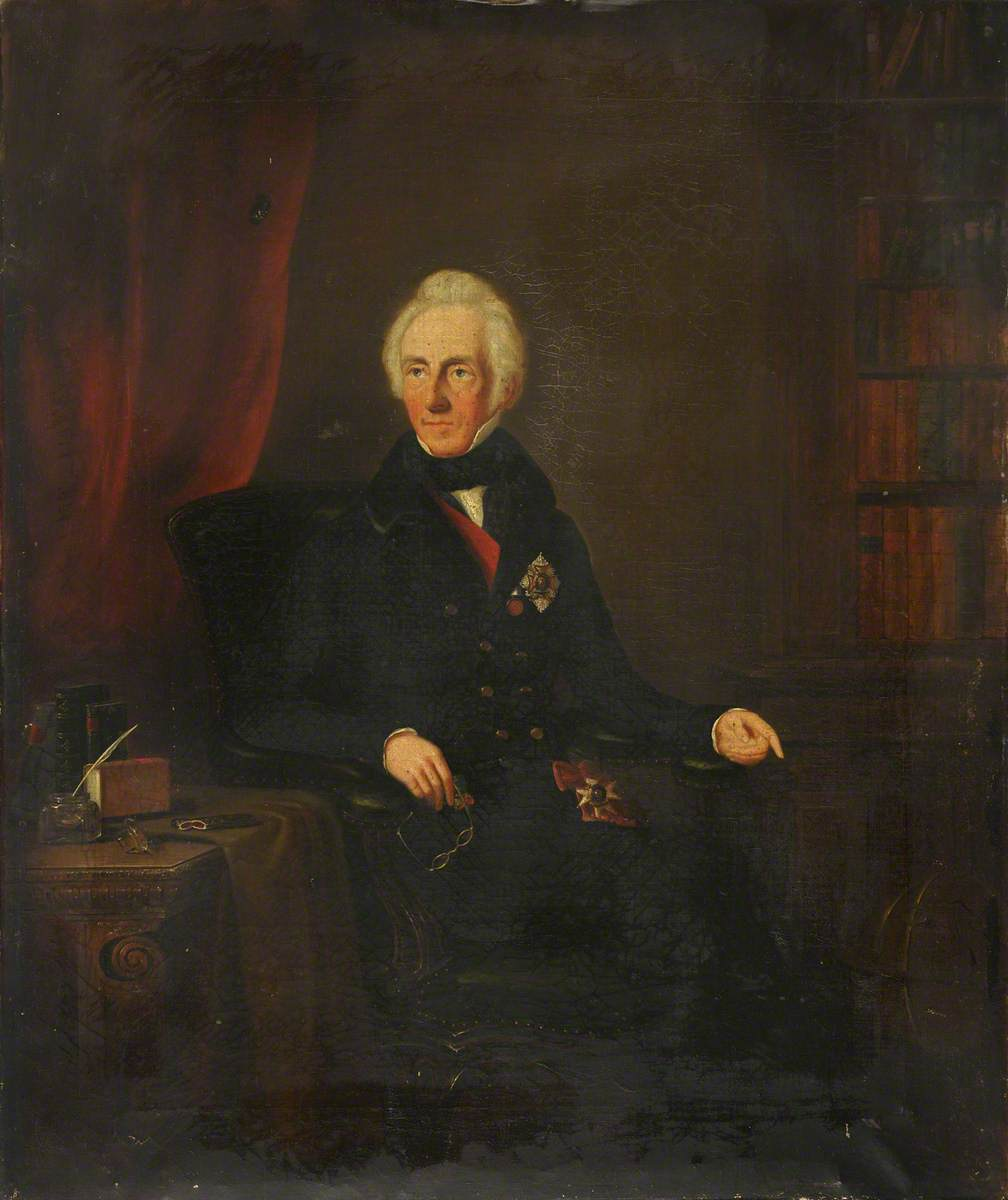
- c. 1840 portrait
- Born: 12 February 1772
- Died: 31 May 1848 (aged 76); Windsor, Berkshire
- Relatives: Lord Hotham (uncle); Henry Hotham (first cousin)
- Military career
- Allegiance: Great Britain; United Kingdom
- Branch: Royal Navy
- Service years: 1779–1848
- Rank: Admiral of the Red
- Commands: HMS Eclair; HMS Cyclops; HMS Adamant; HMS Raisonnable; HMS Royal Sovereign
- Conflicts: French Revolutionary Wars; Battle of the Hyères Islands; Battle of Camperdown; Battle of Port Louis
- Awards: Naval Gold Medal; Knight Grand Cross of the Order of the Bath

Admiral of the Red Sir William Hotham, GCB (12 February 1772 – 31 May 1848) was a Royal Navy officer who served in the French Revolutionary and Napoleonic Wars. Born into a military family Hotham joined the navy as a captain's servant and able seaman, rising through the ranks with service in the Caribbean and Newfoundland. A lieutenant by the outbreak of war with revolutionary France in 1793, Hotham served initially in the Mediterranean, and had been promoted to his first command by 1794.

He saw action with his uncle Lord Hotham's fleet at the Battle of the Hyères Islands in 1795, after which he returned home, taking command of the 50-gun HMS Adamant shortly before the mutiny at the Nore. His ship and Admiral Adam Duncan's flagship were the only two deckers to remain loyal, and the only two ships left to enforce the blockade of the Dutch coast. Despite their severe disadvantage in numbers, Hotham and Admiral Duncan were able to trick the Dutch to stay in port through use of false signals. After this, Hotham continued to serve with Duncan in the North Sea, and took part in his victory at the Battle of Camperdown in October 1797.

After further service in the English Channel Hotham went out to the Cape of Good Hope, taking part in the blockade of the French possessions in the Indian Ocean, and in 1799 helping to destroy the French frigate Preneuse. Taking command of HMS Raisonnable shortly after the end of the temporary Peace of Amiens, Hotham served in the Channel until ill health forced him to resign his command and go ashore. Though he briefly commanded a unit of Sea Fencibles, and later the yacht HMS Royal Sovereign, no seagoing command could be found for him. He spent the rest of the wars ashore, being promoted through the ranks, and being appointed first a Knight Commander and then a Knight Grand Cross of the Order of the Bath. William Hotham died in 1848 at the age of 76.

== Family and early life ==
Hotham was born into a military family on 12 February 1772, with strong connections to the nobility. He was the second son of General George Hotham, and his wife Diana, the youngest daughter of baronet Sir Warton Pennyman-Warton. His uncle was Admiral of the White Lord Hotham, while his first cousin, Henry Hotham, became a vice-admiral. He was educated at Westminster School, with his name being entered on the books of the yacht HMY William & Mary on 21 December 1779. He later attended the Royal Naval Academy, and by January 1786 was aboard the 50-gun HMS Grampus as a captain's servant and ordinary seaman. Grampus's commander, Captain Edward Thompson, was commodore in charge on the African coasts, and Hotham went out to the Guinea coast with him. Hotham was back in Portsmouth by the middle of the year, where he transferred to the 64-gun HMS Ardent on 17 June 1786, joining her as an able seaman. His service on Ardent was short-lived, on 20 September he joined the 32-gun HMS Solebay as a midshipman, serving under Captain John Holloway, and went out to the Leeward Islands.

He was re-rated at his former rank of able seaman on 30 September 1788 during his service in the Caribbean, but on 11 September 1789 the following year, he was back as a midshipman, serving aboard the yacht Royal Charlotte, under Sir Hyde Parker. Hotham's next ship was the 38-gun HMS Hebe, which he joined 20 January 1790, serving under Captain Alexander Hood in the English Channel. He transferred again on 2 June 1790, back under his old captain John Holloway, now commanding the 90-gun HMS Princess Royal as flag captain to Hotham's uncle, Rear-Admiral William Hotham. The younger Hotham received his commission as a lieutenant on 27 October 1790 while serving with his uncle, and remained in Princess Royal until 26 January 1791, when he joined the 20-gun HMS Alligator under Captain Isaac Coffin. Coffin and Hotham went out to Halifax, where Hotham served until his return on 20 October. After a short period spent ashore, he was appointed on 18 February 1792 to serve aboard the 32-gun HMS Winchelsea under Captain Richard Fisher. The Winchelsea returned Hotham to Halifax, followed by service in the Leeward Islands.

== French Revolutionary Wars and first commands ==
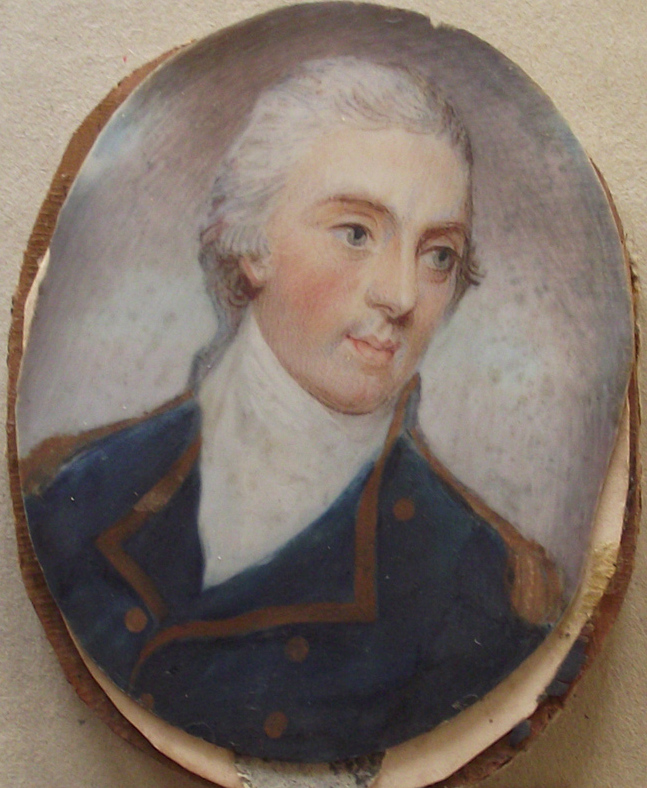
Miniature portrait of Hotham as a post-captain

The outbreak of war with revolutionary France in early 1793 brought opportunities for Hotham to distinguish himself. On 29 May that year he joined the 90-gun HMS Duke and served under Commodore John Murray. Transferring to Captain Augustus Montgomery's 36-gun HMS Inconstant on 11 October, Hotham went out to the Mediterranean to join Lord Hood's fleet. On 13 January the following year Hotham became lieutenant aboard Hood's flagship, the 100-gun HMS Victory, and took part in the evacuation of the French port of Toulon. The following year Hotham took part in the siege of Bastia, serving onshore with the forces led by Horatio Nelson. On 12 August he was appointed to his first command, the sloop HMS Eclair. Two months later, on 7 October, he was advanced to post-captain, and given command of the 28-gun HMS Cyclops. Hotham continued to serve in the Mediterranean, taking part in the Battle of the Hyères Islands with his uncle's fleet on 13 July 1795. He was sent back to Britain with despatches in early 1796, whereupon Cyclops was paid off on 8 March 1796.

=== Crisis at the Nore ===
Hotham spent nearly a year ashore, until he was appointed to command the 50-gun HMS Adamant on 11 January 1797. He was based at the Nore, operating in the North Sea and blockading the Dutch fleet at the Texel with Admiral Adam Duncan's fleet. In May 1797 mutiny broke out among the ships at the Nore, following on from one at Spithead earlier in the year. Of the two decker ships of the fleet, only the crews of Duncan's flagship HMS Venerable, and Hotham's crew aboard the Adamant remained loyal. With only two ships available to blockade the Dutch, Duncan and Hotham took their ships out to sea, remaining in sight of the Dutch coast and for several weeks implied by false signals and manoeuvres, that the rest of the fleet was just over the horizon. Convinced by the impersonation that the blockade was still in force, the Dutch remained in port. A Russian squadron based at Harwich later reinforced Duncan and Hotham and then ships abandoning the mutiny individually too joined them.

=== Camperdown and the Cape of Good Hope ===
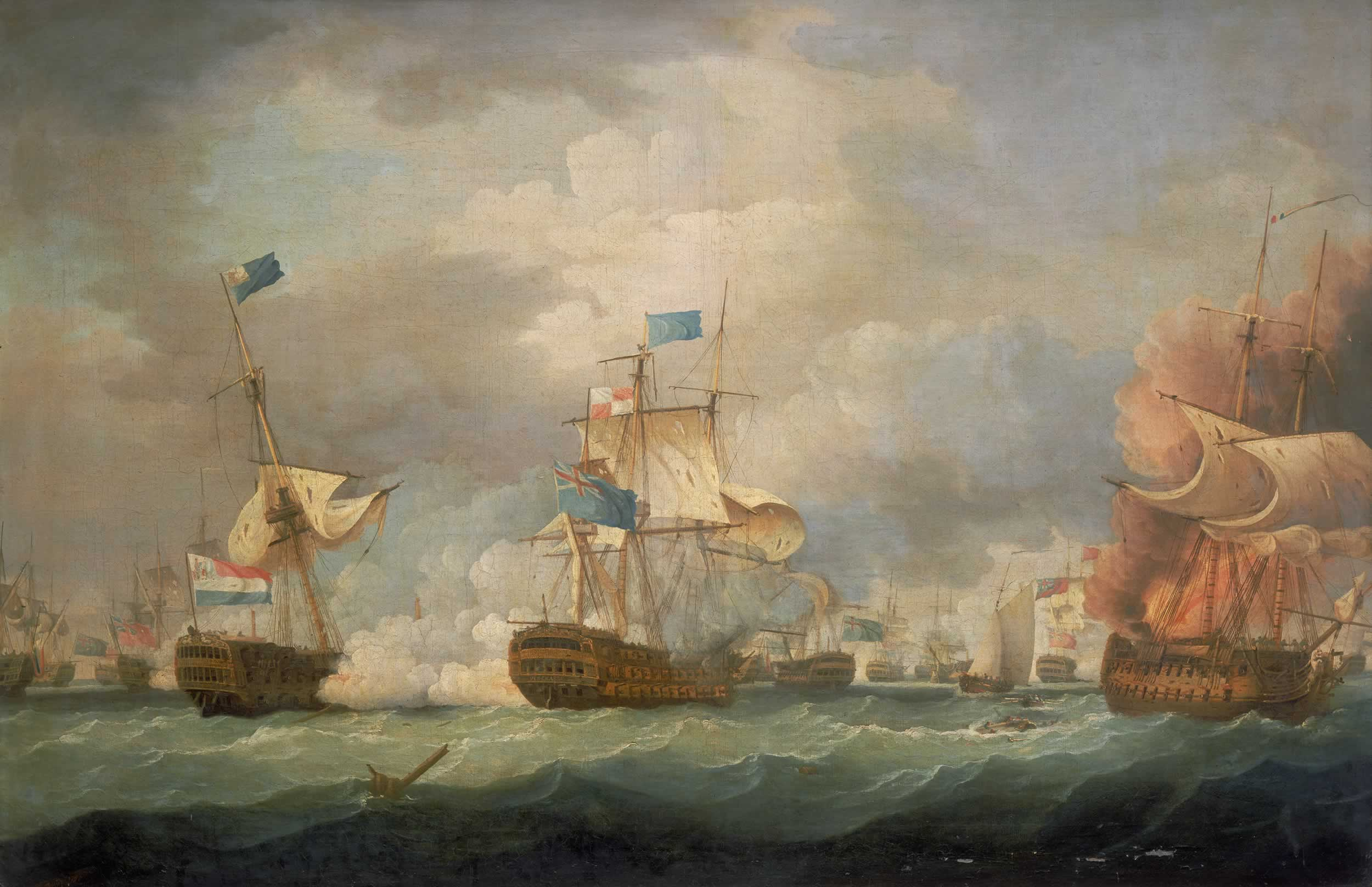
The Battle of Camperdown, 11 October 1797 by Thomas Whitcombe

Hotham remained with Duncan's fleet and on 11 October 1797 was engaged at the Battle of Camperdown. He subsequently received the Naval Gold Medal for his part in the battle. Adamant was then attached to Sir Richard Strachan's squadron patrolling off Le Havre, after which she and Hotham were sent to the Cape of Good Hope, where he remained for the next three years. On 11 December 1799 Hotham was sailing off Port Louis, Mauritius, in company with Captain John Osborn's 74-gun HMS Tremendous when they encountered the 44-gun French frigate Preneuse, under the command of Jean-Marthe-Adrien l'Hermite. They chased her, forcing her to run ashore three miles from Port Louis, under the cover of French shore batteries. Hotham took Adamant in close, and tried to work up to the grounded frigate, coming under heavy fire from the batteries and the Preneuse as he did so. After a period of exchanging fire, the Adamant forced the French frigate to strike, and that evening three boats carrying men from Adamant and Tremendous approached with orders to destroy the French vessel. Despite coming under heavy fire from the batteries, they boarded the ship, captured the remaining French crew, including Captain l'Hermite, and removed as much of their captives' private property, they set fire to the Preneuse and returned to their ships without the loss of a single man at the Battle of Port Louis.

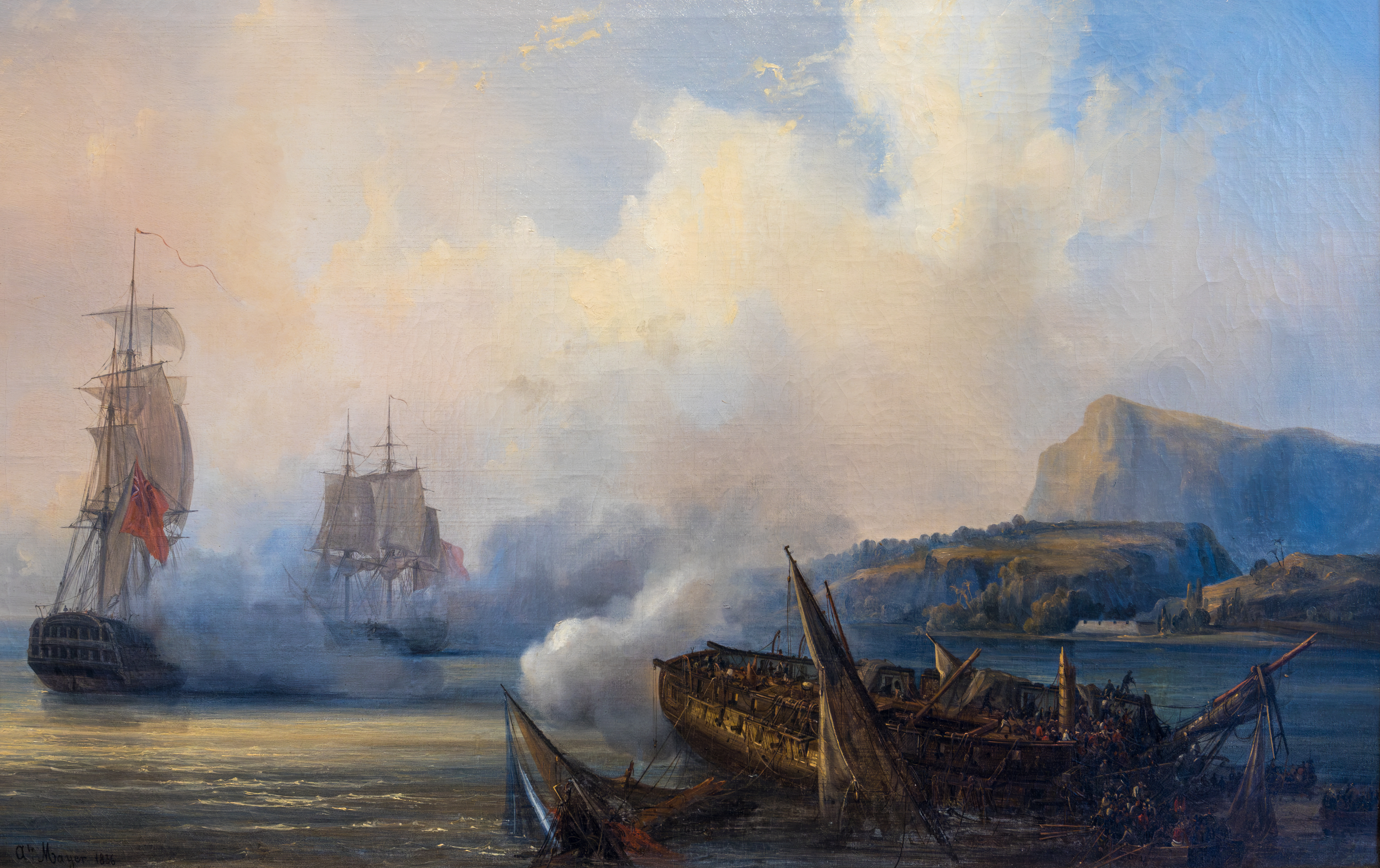
Destruction of Preneuse, by Auguste Mayer

Hotham remained off South Africa and in the Indian Ocean until being recalled to Britain as an escort for a convoy in September 1801, returning on 14 December 1801. The Peace of Amiens left him without a ship, but the resumption of hostilities in 1803 led to his return to active service at sea.

== Napoleonic Wars ==
Hotham was given command of the 64-gun HMS Raisonnable on 14 March 1803 and assigned to serve in the North Sea and the English Channel. He was employed in the blockade of the invasion flotilla at Boulogne, but his health declined while on this service, and he resigned the command on 8 September 1803. He came ashore, and on 12 June 1804 married Anne Jeynes, sister-in-law of Admiral Sir Edward Thornbrough. On 25 May 1808 he returned to semi-active service commanding the Sea Fencibles at Liverpool. He held this position until 28 February 1810. On 31 August 1812 he became commander of the yacht HMS Royal Sovereign, received a promotion to rear-admiral on 4 December 1813, and relinquished command of her on 2 April 1814. He was offered the command of one or two dockyards, but declined them in the hope of being offered a command afloat. Nothing could be found for him however. He became a gentleman-in-waiting at court, later writing a manuscript book entitled Characters, Principally Professional, and was one of the first appointments as Knight Commander of the Order of the Bath on the restructuring of the order on 2 January 1815. He was advanced to vice-admiral on 19 July 1821, and to full admiral on 10 January 1837. He became a Knight Grand Cross of the Order of the Bath on 4 July 1840. Sir William Hotham died at New Windsor, Berkshire on 31 May 1848 at the age of 76. He was buried on 7 June in the family vault at Binfield, Berkshire.

== Family and issue ==
Hotham had four sons and one daughter with his first wife Anne Jeynes. Two sons followed him into the navy, another entered the Church. Jayne died on 21 August 1827, and in 1835 Hotham married Jane Seymour.

== Namesakes ==
The Royal Navy has named two ships after Hotham. The first was a Colony-class frigate constructed in 1943 initially named HMS Hotham, but her name was changed to HMS Bahamas (K503) prior to completion. The second was the Captain-class frigate HMS Hotham (K583), which served from 1944 to 1956.

== See also ==
- O'Byrne, William Richard (1849). "Hotham, William (a)" . A Naval Biographical Dictionary . John Murray – via Wikisource.
