= Admiral Mitchell =

Admiral Mitchell may refer to:

- Andrew Mitchell (Royal Navy officer) (1757–1806), British Royal Navy admiral
- David Mitchell (Royal Navy officer) (c. 1650–1710), British Royal Navy vice admiral
- Francis Mitchell (Royal Navy officer) (1876–1946), British Royal Navy admiral
- William Mitchell (Royal Navy officer) (c. 1745–1816), British Royal Navy vice admiral
