= French ship Impétueux =

At least two ships of the French Navy have been named Impétueux:

- French ship Impétueux (1787) a Téméraire-class ship of the line launched in 1787 and captured by the Royal Navy in 1794
- French ship Impétueux (1803) a Téméraire-class ship of the line launched in 1803 as Brutus but renamed before commission, she was lost in 1806
