= French frigate Volontaire =

French frigate Volontaire may refer to the following ships:

- French frigate Volontaire (1693), wrecked 1695
- French frigate Volontaire (1695), captured and wrecked at the Battle of Vigo Bay in 1702
- French frigate Montange (1794), renamed Volontaire, wrecked 1794
- French frigate Volontaire (1796), a Virginie-class frigate, captured by the Royal Navy in 1806, becoming HMS Volontaire
