= French frigate Preneuse =

Preneuse-class frigate of the French Navy

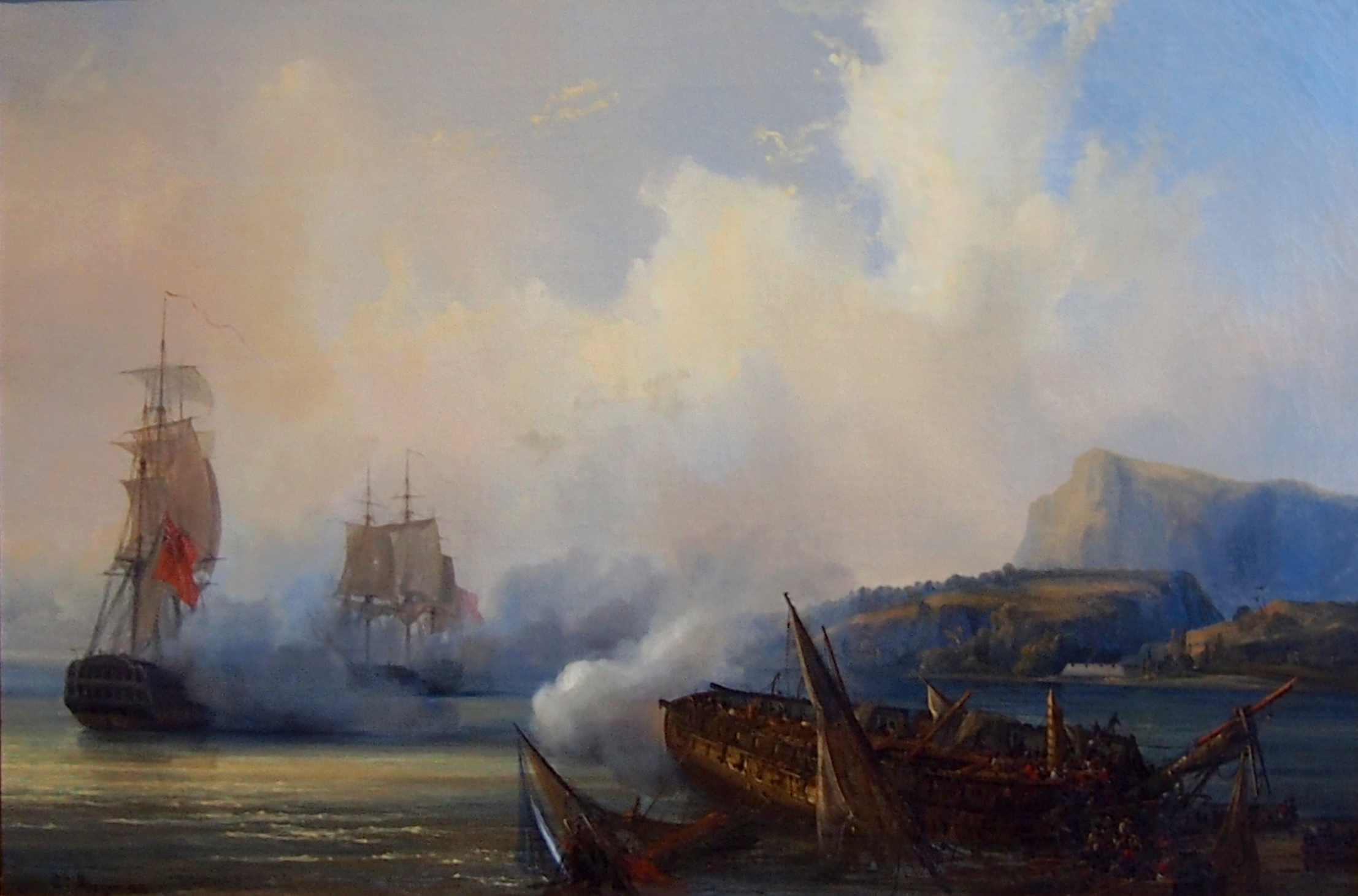
- Preneuse (first from right) at the Battle of Port Louis

History

France
- Name: Preneuse
- Namesake: "taker"
- Ordered: 24 April 1794
- Builder: Rochefort, Charente-Maritime
- Laid down: April 1794
- Launched: 16 February 1795
- In service: July 1795
- Fate: Destroyed on 11 December 1799

General characteristics
- Class & type: Preneuse-class frigate
- Displacement: 1400 tonneaux
- Tons burthen: 722 port tonneaux
- Length: 47.8 m (156 ft 10 in)
- Beam: 11.9 m (39 ft 1 in)
- Draught: 5.8 m (19 ft 0 in)
- Complement: 300
- Armament: 28 × 18-pounder long guns; 12 × 8-pounder long guns

Preneuse was a 44-gun Preneuse-class frigate of the French Navy. The lead ship of her class, she was designed by the shipwright Raymond-Antoine Haran and built at Rochefort. During the French Revolutionary Wars, Preneuse served as a commerce raider at the colony of Isle de France until she was destroyed at the Battle of Port Louis in 1799.

== Career ==
In 1795, Preneuse was stationed at Rochefort under Captain Larcher. She was then transferred to the Indian Ocean station, commanded by Rear-Admiral Sercey. In 1796, she was at Mauritius under Captain Ravenel, at Port-Nord-Ouest. In March 1798, under Lhermitte, she ferried ambassadors from Mysore sent by Tipu Sultan to île de France to request help against the British. Near Tellicherry, Preneuse found two East Indiamen, Raymond and Woodcot at Tellicherry; she attacked and captured both on 20 April, after a one-hour battle. She left the diplomatic mission at Mangalore, and sailed to Batavia.

She was soon joined by the 22-gun corvette Brûle-Gueule, which ferried Rear-Admiral Sercey. The squadron sailed to Surabaya, where a settlement was established. A small mutiny broke out when Preneuse's crew refused to let go of the British flags captured at Tellicherry; Lhermitte had to personally confront the mutineers with his sabre to re-establish discipline. He then had a firing squad execute five of the mutineers. After a short stay at Surabaya, Preneuse and Brûle-Gueule sailed for a three-month cruise, capturing 40 British merchantmen and participating in the Macau Incident. After returning to Subaraya, Sercey set his flag on Preneuse and the squadron sailed for île de France.

They arrived in May 1799, encountering the British blockade composed of three ships of the line, one frigate and one brig. The French ships reached Rivière Noire District, where they were joined by a number of coastal ships offering assistance. Preneuse and Brûle-Gueule anchored in the bay. They sent seven 18-pounders ashore and the French built an improvised fort to guard the entrance of the bay; it sustained a 3-week siege before the British retreated. In August 1799, Preneuse departed for a patrol near Cape of Good Hope and Madagascar. On 4 September, she fought against five British ships. In September, she fought against a 64-gun ship of the line.

Preneuse also attempted to supply arms to the Republic of Graaff-Reinet. On the 20th, she sailed into Algoa Bay under Danish colours but was recognised. Preneuse exchanged cannon fire with the 16-gun ship-sloop HMS Rattlesnake and the armed store ship Camel, before retreating. On 9 October 1799, as Preneuse neared Good Hope, the 54-gun HMS Jupiter encountered her and gave chase. After 22 hours, Jupiter gained on Preneuse, and the two vessels exchanged fire. Preneuse managed to outmaneuver Jupiter and rake her; the British then retreated to avoid being boarded, and managed to escape.

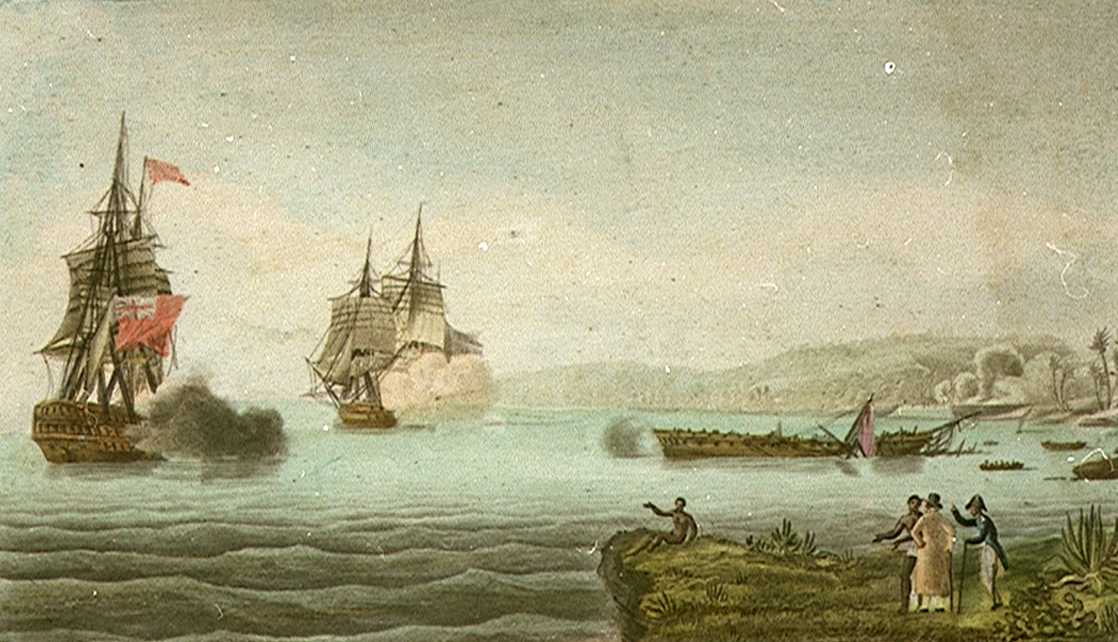
Destruction of the Preneuse

On 11 December 1799, as she returned to Île de France, Preneuse encountered the 74-gun HMS Tremendous, under Captain John Osborn, off Port Louis. Tremendous gave chase. As Preneuse closed to the land, the 50-gun HMS Adamant, under Captain William Hotham, cut her escape route. While Preneuse was attempting to sail under the protection of the coastal forts at Baie-du-Tombeau, erratic winds drove her ashore. The British closed in and battered Preneuse, which Lhermitte then deemed lost. He had the crew abandon ship, while he stayed behind with his officers, struck the colours and scuttled the frigate. British boats attempted to recover Preneuse, but she came under fire from the coastal batteries and they abandoned the attempt. The British took Preneuse's officers to Adamant, where Commodore Botham treated them with courtesy. He released Lhermitte on parole the next day.
