= HMS Adamant (1780) =

Portland-class ship of the line of the Royal Navy

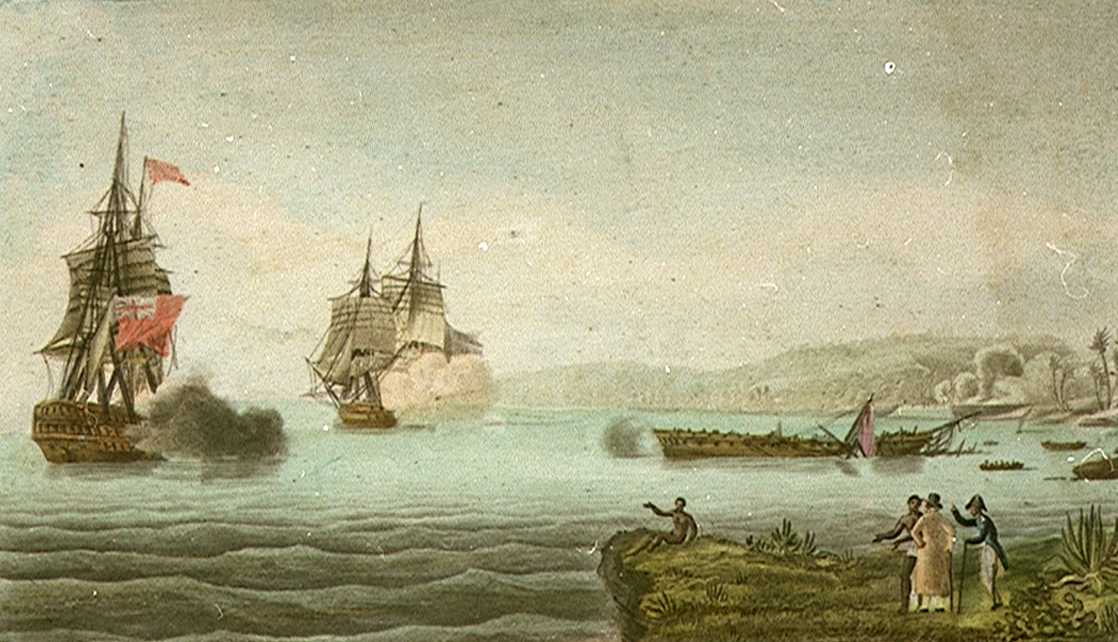
- Adamant (second from left) at the Battle of Port Louis

History

Great Britain
- Name: HMS Adamant
- Ordered: 13 November 1776
- Builder: Peter Baker, Liverpool
- Laid down: 6 September 1777
- Launched: 24 January 1780
- Completed: By 12 August 1780
- Fate: Broken up in June 1814

General characteristics
- Class & type: 50-gun Portland-class fourth rate
- Tons burthen: 1,059 63/94 (bm)
- Length: 146 ft 3 in (44.6 m) (overall); 120 ft (36.6 m) (keel)
- Beam: 40 ft 9 in (12.4 m)
- Depth of hold: 17 ft 7 1/2 in (5.37 m)
- Propulsion: Sails
- Sail plan: Full-rigged ship
- Complement: 350
- Armament: Lower deck: 22 × 24-pounders; Upper deck: 22 × 12-pounders; Quarter deck: 4 × 6-pounders; Forecastle: 2 × 6-pounders

HMS Adamant was a 50-gun Portland-class fourth-rate ship of the line of the Royal Navy. She served during the American War of Independence, the French Revolutionary Wars, and the Napoleonic Wars in a career that spanned thirty years.

Built during the American War of Independence she spent the last three years of the war off the American coast, and saw action at the Battle of Cape Henry and at the Battle of the Chesapeake. The years of peace were spent either in the Caribbean or off Nova Scotia, before the outbreak of the French Revolutionary Wars saw her commissioned for service in the Leeward Islands and off the British coast. It was while serving in British waters that she became caught up in the mutiny at the Nore. As one of only two two-decker ships to remain in action during the mutiny she had to maintain the Dutch blockade by creating the illusion of being part of a larger fleet, which she managed successfully.

Adamant then went on to fight at the Battle of Camperdown, after which she moved to the English Channel, and then the Indian Ocean via the Cape of Good Hope. Here she took part in the destruction of the French commerce raider Preneuse, and in her later years captured a number of privateers. She became a receiving ship and flagship of a port admiral during the last years of the Napoleonic Wars, until being broken up in June 1814.

== Design and construction ==
Adamant was one of eleven ships built to a 1767 design by John Williams, and one of five ordered between 1775-6. She was ordered from Peter Baker, of Liverpool, on 13 November 1776, and laid down on 6 September 1777. The ship was launched on 24 January 1780, and completed between 13 June and 12 August 1780 at Plymouth. Her initial cost was £16,313.13.10d, rising to £27,497.3.0d when the cost of fitting her out was included.

== Career ==
=== North America ===
Adamant was commissioned in November 1779 under the command of Captain Gideon Johnstone, and sailed for North America on 13 August 1780. She was with Vice-Admiral Mariot Arbuthnot's squadron at the Battle of Cape Henry on 16 March 1781, and then at the Battle of the Chesapeake on 5 September 1781. Johnstone was succeeded by Captain David Graves in February 1782, while Adamant was still in North America, after which she returned to Britain as a convoy escort in December 1782. The ship was then paid off in April 1783 and refitted for foreign service between May and September that year. Adamant recommissioned in June 1783 under Captain William Kelly, and on the completion of her refit, sailed to the Leeward Islands in November, where she spent the next three years as the flagship of Admiral Sir Richard Hughes. She was paid off again in September 1786 and underwent a great repair, followed by being fitted out as the flagship at Sheerness from August 1787 to May 1789. Adamant was recommissioned in February 1789 by Captain David Knox, after which Admiral Hughes again hoisted his flag in her and sailed her to Nova Scotia in June. From January 1792 the ship was under Captain Charles Hope, until returning to Britain in June that year and being paid off.

=== French Revolutionary Wars ===
Adamant was at first fitted for reserve duty in July 1792, but with the outbreak of war with Revolutionary France in April 1793 she was hurriedly recommissioned, at first under Captain William Bentinck and at some point in 1794 William Mitchell was her acting-captain. From June 1794 she was under Captain Henry D'Esterre Darby. Darby took Adamant back to the Leeward Islands in September 1794, and by April 1796 Adamant was serving with George Vandeput's squadron. Captain Henry Warre took command in November 1796, and was succeeded by Captain William Hotham on 11 January 1797.

=== Mutiny at the Nore, and Camperdown ===
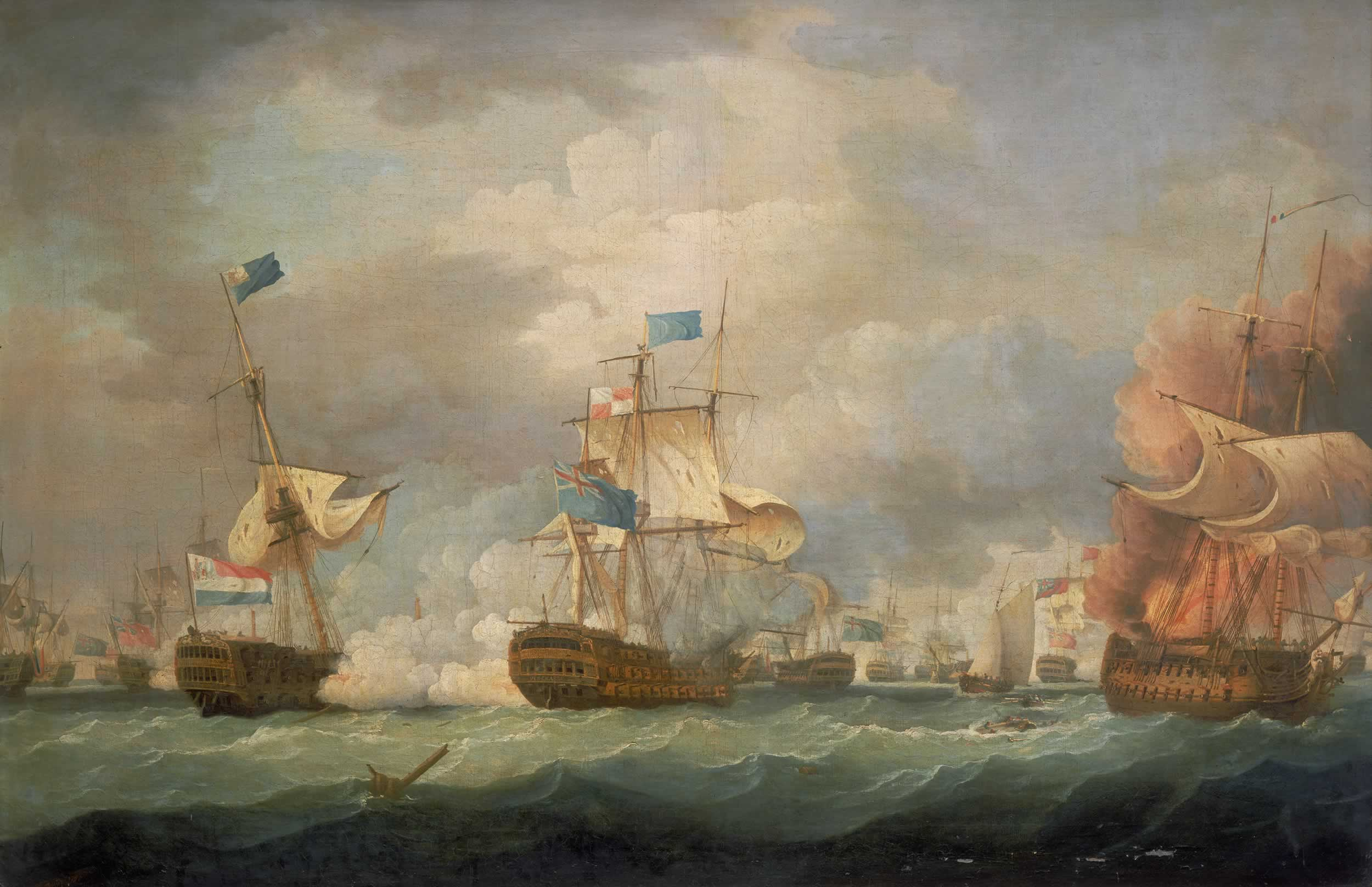
The Battle of Camperdown, 11 October 1797 (Thomas Whitcombe, 1798)

Adamant was based at the Nore, operating in the North Sea and blockading the Dutch fleet at the Texel with Admiral Adam Duncan's fleet. In May 1797 mutiny broke out among the ships at the Nore, following on from one at Spithead earlier in the year. Of the two-decker ships of the fleet, only the crews of Duncan's flagship HMS Venerable, and Hotham's crew aboard Adamant remained loyal. With only two ships available to blockade the Dutch, Duncan and Hotham took their ships out to sea, remaining in sight of the Dutch coast and for several weeks implied by false signals and manoeuvres, that the rest of the fleet was just over the horizon. Convinced by the impersonation that the blockade was still in force, the Dutch remained in port. Duncan and Hotham were later reinforced by the Russian squadron based at Harwich, and then by ships deserting the mutiny one by one.

Adamant then fought as part of Duncan's fleet at the Battle of Camperdown on 11 October 1797. The battle was a decisive victory for the British over the Dutch, led by Admiral Jan Willem de Winter, with Adamant escaping sustaining any casualties. Adamant was then attached to Sir Richard Strachan's squadron patrolling off Le Havre. During this period, some of her crew were court-martialed for mutiny. Adamant and Hotham were then sent with a convoy to the Cape of Good Hope in October 1798.

=== Indian Ocean ===
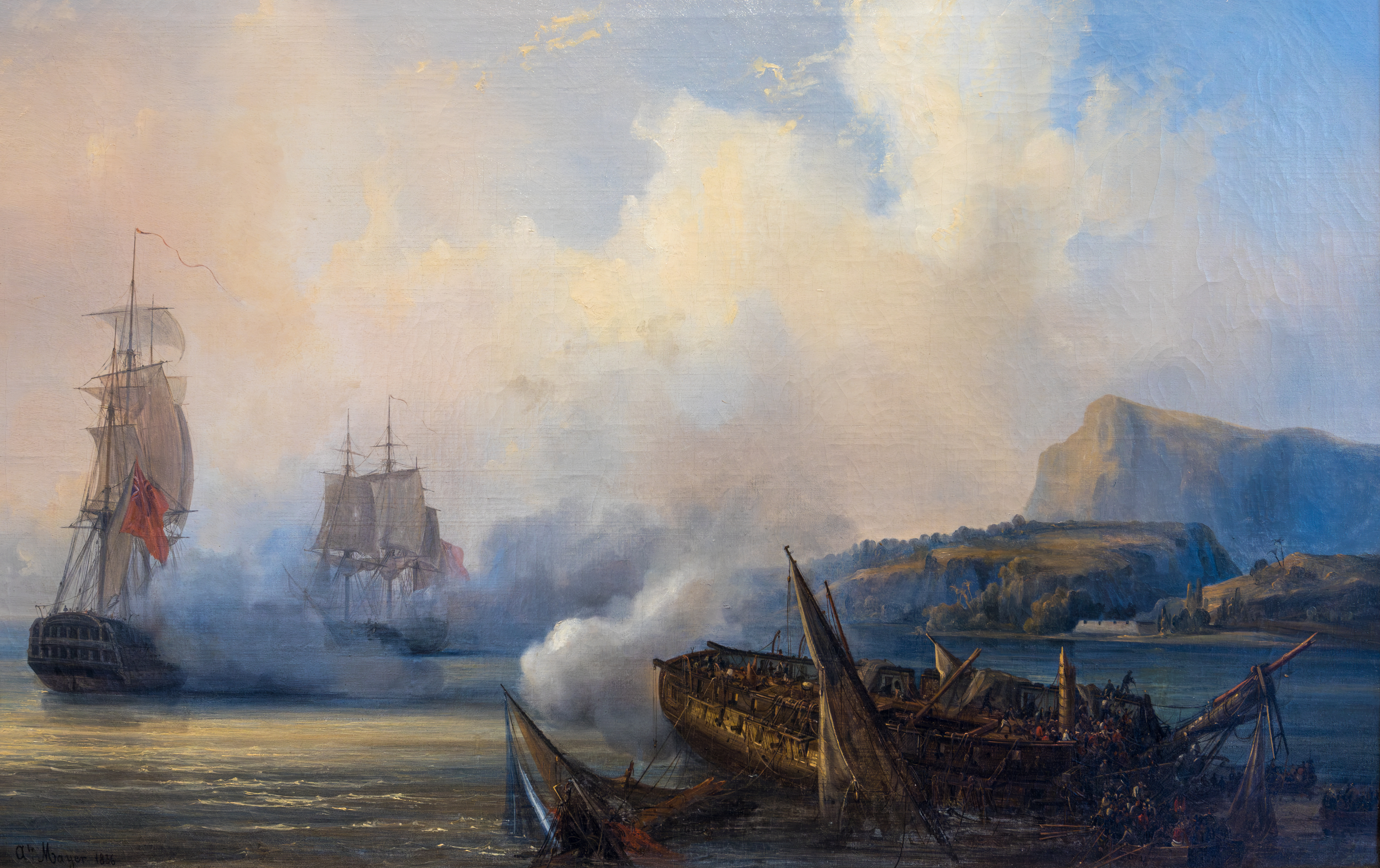
Painting of the Battle of Port Louis by Auguste Étienne François Mayer

While operating in the Indian Ocean, on 25 April 1799 Adamant, Jupiter, and Tremendous recaptured Chance as she lay at anchor under the guns of the battery at Connonies-Point, Île de France. The French frigate Forte had captured Chance in Balasore Roads. She was carrying a cargo of rice. The squadron also recaptured another ship that a French privateer had captured in the Bay of Bengal. Lastly, after the French had driven the American ship Pacific onshore at River Noir, the British sent in their boats and removed much of her cargo of bale goods and sugar. The British then set Pacific on fire.

Then Adamant and Tremendous, under Captain John Osborn. encountered the French commerce raider Preneuse, under Captain Jean-Marthe-Adrien l'Hermite, off Port Louis, Île de France on 11 December 1799. In the ensuing Battle of Port Louis they chased her, forcing her to run ashore three miles from Port Louis, but under the cover of French shore batteries. Hotham took Adamant in close, and tried to work up to the grounded frigate, coming under heavy fire from the batteries and Preneuse as he did so. After a period of exchanging fire, Adamant forced Preneuse to strike. That evening three boats carrying men from Adamant and Tremendous boarded Preneuse, despite coming under heavy fire from the batteries. They captured the remaining French crew, including Captain l'Hermite, and removed as much of their captives' private property as they could. They then set fire to Preneuse and returned to their ships without the loss of a single man.

On 11 March, 1800 she was at Cape Town.

In July 1800, Curtis sent Adamant, Lancaster, Rattlesnake, and Euphrosyne to blockade Isle de France and Bourbon. They remained until October and during this period shared in the proceeds of several captures.

- Spanish ship Edouard(August). This vessel may actually have been a French ship of 300 tons (bm), carrying naval stores, wine, brandy, and the like from Bordeaux to Isle de France.
- French brig Paquebot (August). She had been sailing from Isle de France to Bourbon with a cargo of wine and goods from India.
- Spanish brig Numero Sete (August). Numero Septo had been sailing from Montevideo to Isle de France with a cargo of soap, tallow, candles, and provisions.
- French brig Mouche and part of the cargo and materials from the wreck of the brig Uranie (September).

Hotham remained off South Africa and in the Indian Ocean until being recalled to Britain. Adamant escorted a convoy in September 1801, arriving in Britain on 14 December 1801.

== Napoleonic Wars ==
Adamant spent between May 1803 and August 1804 under repair at Chatham Dockyard, before recommissioning in June under Captain George Burlton. On 13 April 1805 Adamant and HMS Inflexible captured the 4-gun privateer Alert, and in October 1805 command passed to Captain John Stiles. Stiles escorted a convoy of East Indiamen in 1806, and on 6 May captured the Spanish 26-gun privateer Nuestra Señora de los Dolores off the Cape of Good Hope. On 17 June 1807 he added another prize to his total, capturing the 1-gun privateer Bueno Union while serving on the Jamaica station. Stiles was succeeded by Captain Micaiah Macbon in October 1807, and Adamant returned to the Jamaica station the following year. By early 1809 she was back in Britain, and spent the period between April and July 1809 being fitted at Chatham for service as a receiving ship at Leith. She was recommissioned in May 1809 under Captain John Sykes and in August took part in the Scheldt operations. Captain Matthew Buckle took command in August 1810, and remained Adamant's captain for the next three years, which she spent as flagship of Rear-Admiral Robert Otway, and as a receiving ship at Leith. As the Napoleonic Wars drew to a close the ship was laid up in ordinary at Sheerness in 1814, and then broken up there in June 1814.
