= Chance (1799 ship) =

British India merchant ship 1799

History
- Name: Chance
- Completed: circa 1799
- Fate: Lost May 1799

Chance was built in India c.1799. No other data is available on this ship. (Note: The Bombay Almanack and Register, for ... 1798 has a mention of a Chance, with Inverarity, master, and Pestonjee Bomanjee and William Johnson, owners. Pestonjee Bomanjee was the head of the Wadia family of merchants and shipbuilders, and was the wealthiest and most distinguished of the Bombay Parsis. Almost all of the vessels he and the family owned were built in Bombay. However, Chance does not appear in the list of vessels built by the Wadia's Bombay Dockyard between 1775 and 1799, at least not under that name. It also does not appear on a list of vessels that Pestonjee Bomanjee was known to have owned.)

The French frigate Forte captured several ships in early 1799 in the Bay of Bengal. Among them were Chance, Johnson, master, and Earl Mornington, Cook, master. The French put the crews of the captured ships on one of the captured vessels, and then sent that vessel to Madras as a cartel. Chance was taken in Balasore Roads, and sent to Île de France.

On 25 April 1799 HMS Jupiter, Adamant, and Tremendous recaptured Chance as she lay at anchor under the guns of the battery at Connonier Point (Pointe aux Cannoniers), Île de France. She was carrying a cargo of rice.

As she was sailing towards England, Chance was lost near Saint Mary's Bay, Madagascar in May 1799.
