= Preneuse-class frigate =

Class overview
- Name: Preneuse
- Builders: Rochefort
- Operators: French Navy; Royal Navy
- Preceded by: Virginie class
- Succeeded by: Armide class
- Completed: 2
- Lost: 2

General characteristics
- Type: frigate
- Displacement: 1400 tonneaux
- Tons burthen: 722 port tonneaux
- Length: 47.75 metres
- Beam: 11.85 metres
- Draught: 5.8 metres
- Depth of hold: 6.17 metres
- Propulsion: Sail
- Complement: 340 in wartime; 260 in peacetime
- Armament: 44 guns: 28 18-pounder long guns; 12 8-pounder long guns; 4 36-pounder obuses
- Armour: Timber
- Notes: Ships in class include: Preneuse, Africaine

The Preneuse class was a type of two 44-gun frigates of the French Navy, designed by Raymond-Antoine Haran and built at Rochefort, Charente-Maritime.

- Preneuse

Builder: Rochefort Dockyard
Ordered: 24 April 1794
Begun: April 1794
Launched: 16 February 1795
Completed: July 1795
Fate: Ran aground 11 December 1799 on the Île de France (Mauritius) to avoid attack by British warships, which then burnt her.

- Africaine

Builder: Rochefort Dockyard
Ordered: 1795
Begun: March 1795
Launched: 3 January 1798
Completed: May 1798
Fate: Captured 19 February 1801 by HMS Phoebe east of Gibraltar. Recaptured 13 September 1810 by the French but immediately retaken bu HMS Boadicea. Taken to pieces in September 1816.
