= George Losack =

Royal Navy Admiral (died 1829)

Admiral George Losack (died 19 September 1829) was an officer of the British Royal Navy who saw service in the American Revolutionary War the French Revolutionary and Napoleonic Wars.

Losack commanded the brig HMS Termagant in the Caribbean during the late stages of the American Revolutionary War and was promoted to post captain during the Spanish Armament of 1790. In 1796 he took command of the 50-gun fourth rate ship HMS Jupiter and joined the squadron at the Cape of Good Hope, assisting in the surrender of a Dutch squadron at the Capitulation of Saldanha Bay. He was still at the station in November 1798 when Captain Hugh Cloberry Christian died, leaving Losack as senior and thus de facto commanding officer. This status was lost on the arrival in 1799 of Admiral Sir Roger Curtis.

After the Peace of Amiens Jupiter returned to Britain and was paid off. On the commencement of the Napoleonic Wars Losack returned to service as captain of the 98-gun ship of the line HMS Prince George. He was subsequently promoted to rear-admiral in 1808, vice-admiral in 1813 and full admiral in 1825 without returning to active service. he died in Milan in September 1829.
