= Rivière du Tombeau =

River in Mauritius

Coordinates: 20°06′S 57°31′E

Rivière du Tombeau is a river in northwestern Mauritius. Its source is on the slopes of Pieter Both Mountain, from where it flows north and then west for a total of 16 kilometres, reaching the Indian Ocean at Baie-du-Tombeau, north of the capital of Port Louis.
