= Virginie-class frigate =

Class of French navy frigates

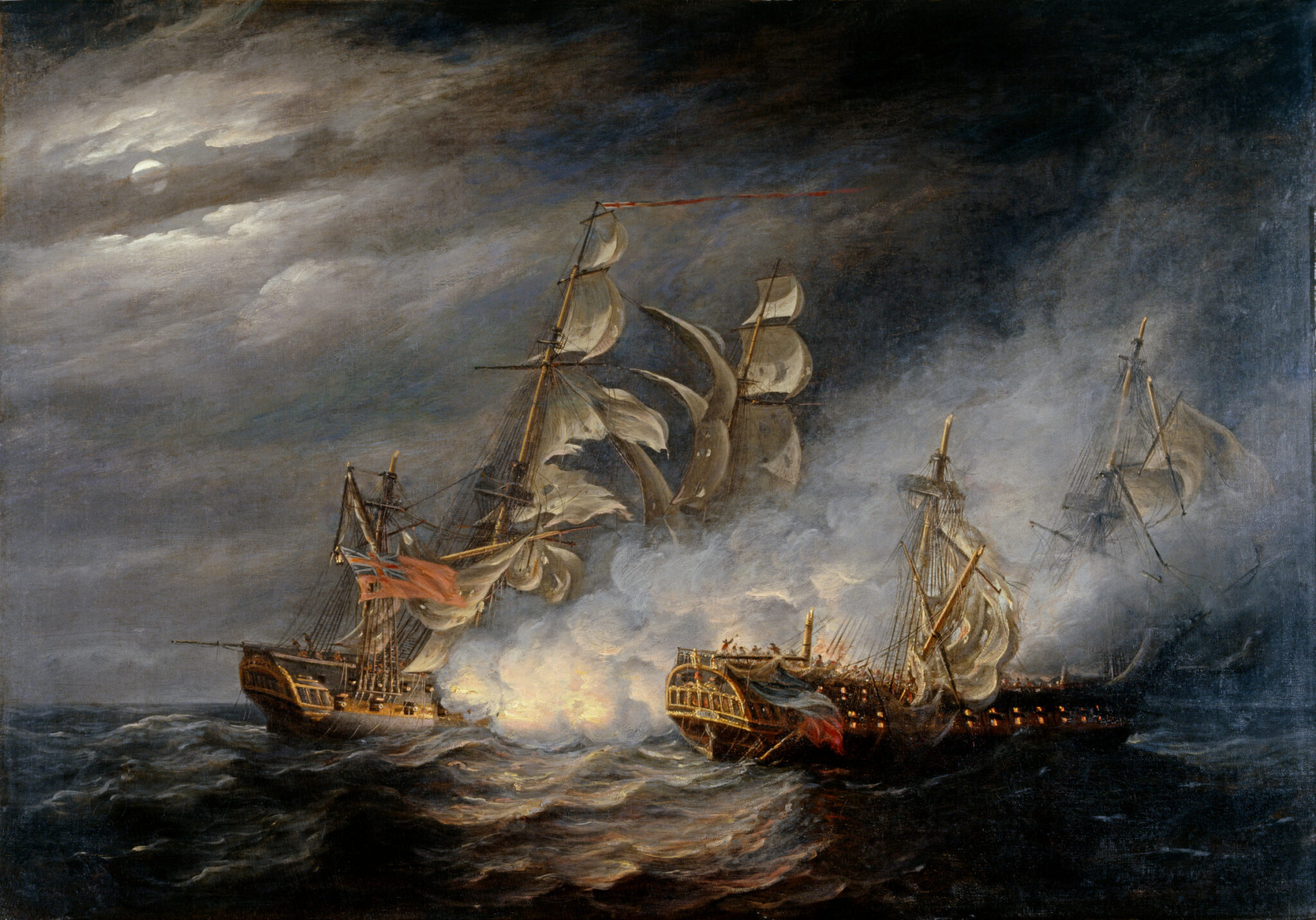
- Virginie (right) fighting HMS Indefatigable on 21 April 1796

Class overview
- Name: Virginie
- Builders: Toulon
- Operators: French Navy; Royal Navy
- Preceded by: Seine class
- Succeeded by: Preneuse class
- Completed: 10
- Canceled: 1

General characteristics
- Type: Frigate
- Displacement: 1,390 tonneaux
- Tons burthen: 720 port tonneaux
- Length: 47.4 m (155 ft 6 in)
- Beam: 11.9 m (39 ft 1 in)
- Draught: 5.5 m (18 ft 1 in)
- Propulsion: Sail
- Armament: 40 guns {though pierced for 44 guns}
- Armour: Timber

The Virginie class was a class of ten 40-gun frigates of the French Navy, designed in 1793 by Jacques-Noël Sané. An eleventh vessel (Zephyr) begun in 1794 was never completed.

== Ships in class ==
- Virginie

Builder: Brest
Begun: November 1793
Launched: 26 July 1794
Completed: December 1794
Fate: Captured by the British Navy on 22 April 1796, becoming HMS Virginie.

- Courageuse

Builder: Brest
Begun: December 1793
Launched: early August 1794
Completed: December 1794
Fate: Renamed Justice April 1795. Captured by the British Navy in September 1801, but not added to Royal Navy; instead, handed over to the Turkish Navy.

- Harmonie

Builder: Bordeaux
Begun: May 1794
Launched: December 1795
Completed: May 1796
Fate: Beached and burnt to avoid capture by the British Navy in April 1797.

- Volontaire

Builder: Bordeaux
Begun: September 1794
Launched: 7 June 1796
Completed: 1796
Fate: Captured by the British Navy on 4 March 1806, becoming HMS Volontaire.

- Cornélie

Builder: Brest
Begun: March 1794
Launched: 19 September 1796
Completed: April 1798
Fate: Captured by the Spanish Navy in June 1808, becoming Spanish Cornelia.

- Zéphyr

Builder: Brest
Begun: March 1794
Fate: Construction abandoned in April 1804 (never launched).

- Didon

Builder: Saint Malo
Begun: September 1796
Launched: 1 August 1799
Completed: September 1800
Fate: Captured by the British Navy on 10 August 1805, becoming HMS Didon.

- Atalante

Builder: Saint Malo
Begun: September 1799
Launched: 29 June 1802
Completed: July 1802
Fate: Wrecked in November 1805.

- Rhin

Builder: Toulon
Begun: June 1801
Launched: 15 April 1802
Completed: October 1802
Fate: Captured by the British Navy on 27 July 1806, becoming HMS Rhin.

- Belle Poule

Builder: Basse-Indre
Begun: June 1801
Launched: 17 April 1802
Completed: September 1802
Fate: Captured by the British Navy on 13 March 1806, becoming HMS Belle Poule.

- Surveillante

Builder: Basse-Indre
Begun: July 1801
Launched: 29 May 1802
Completed: December 1802
Fate: Captured by the British Navy on 30 November 1803, becoming HMS Surveillante.
