= William Mitchell (Royal Navy officer) =

Vice-Admiral Sir William Mitchell KCB
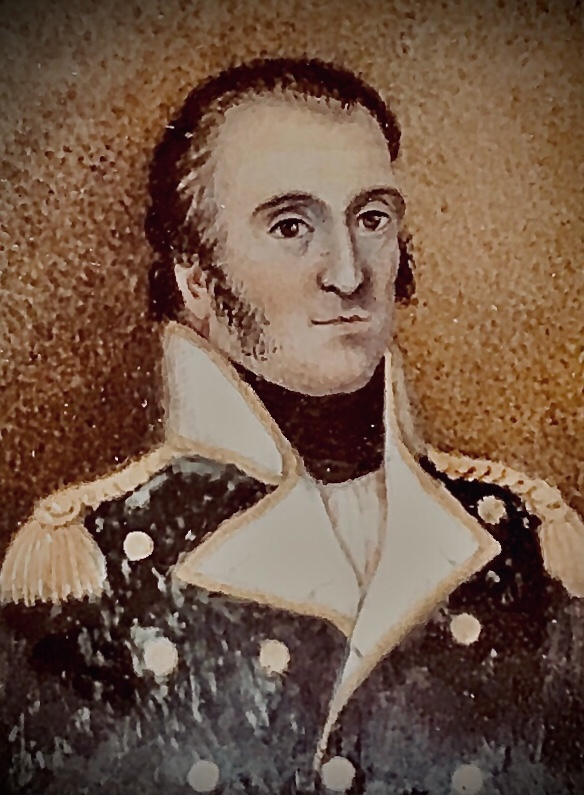
- A Painting of Navy Officer Sir William Mitchell
- Born: c. 1745
- Died: 7 March 1816; Camberwell, Surrey
- Military career
- Allegiance: United Kingdom
- Branch: Royal Navy
- Rank: Vice-Admiral
- Commands: HMS Pigmy; HMS Adamant; HMS Isis; HMS Resolution; HMS Zealand; Shoreham-by-Sea Sea Fencibles
- Conflicts: American Revolutionary War; French Revolutionary Wars; Battle of Camperdown; Napoleonic Wars

Vice-Admiral Sir William Mitchell KCB (c. 1745 – 7 March 1816) was an officer of the British Royal Navy during the eighteenth and early nineteenth centuries. Mitchell is best known for rising from humble origins to high rank, having joined the Navy in 1766 as an able seaman and died in 1816 as a vice-admiral. His service was highly varied, including a circumnavigation of the world, command of a ship at the Battle of Camperdown in 1797 and a period as Sir James Saumarez's flag captain. He was also rumoured to have once been flogged round the fleet for desertion, although no firm evidence of this has been discovered.

== Life ==
Nothing is known of William Mitchell's birth, youth or childhood, other than that he must have been born in either 1745 or 1746 as his age at his death was reported to be 70. The first time that he appears in the historical record is in 1766, when he joined the Royal Navy ship HMS Dolphin under Captain Samuel Wallis. As he was already rated as an able seaman, it is likely that he was already experienced at sea, and he remained on board Dolphin during Wallis' circumnavigation of the world between 1766 and 1768. He then disappears from Navy records, not reappearing again until July 1777, when he reenlisted on HMS Hector during the American Revolutionary War. As an experienced seaman, he was able to secure a promotion to master's mate and midshipman, transferring to HMS Victory and then in 1781 to HMS Foudroyant as an acting lieutenant.

In November 1781 he went before a Navy board and was confirmed in the rank of lieutenant. In 1790, after the Peace of Paris, Mitchell was promoted to post captain and in 1792 took command of the 14-gun HMS Pigmy, moving to HMS Adamant and then HMS Isis two year later. Mitchell remained in command of Isis for the next six years, and saw action at the Battle of Camperdown in 1797, defeating the much larger Dutch ship Gelijkheid.

In 1800, Mitchell moved to HMS Resolution and then in 1803 to HMS Zealand, the flagship of Admiral Sir James Saumarez. By 1807, Mitchell had been returned to shore service, commanding the sea fencibles at Shoreham-by-Sea. In 1808 he was promoted to rear-admiral and continued to rise through the ranks during his years on shore, becoming a vice-admiral in 1813 and being made a Knight Commander of the Order of the Bath shortly before his death at Camberwell in Surrey on 7 March 1816. Many years after his death, Sir John Ross wrote of him that he had "risen to the rank of rear-admiral by his good conduct, after having been flogged round the fleet for desertion". This claim, which has never been backed up by firm evidence, may be accurate given the odd disappearance of Mitchell from Navy records between 1768 and 1777.
