= French ship Impétueux (1803) =

Ship of the line of the French Navy

- Scale model of Achille, sister ship of French ship Impétueux (1803), on display at the Musée national de la Marine in Paris.

History

France
- Name: Impétueux
- Ordered: 31 May 1798
- Laid down: 22 September 1798
- Launched: 24 January 1803 as Brutus
- Commissioned: March 1803
- Decommissioned: 14 September 1806
- Renamed: Impétueux on 5 February 1803
- Captured: By the Royal Navy, 14 September 1806
- Fate: Destroyed by fire, 14 September 1806

General characteristics
- Class & type: Téméraire-class ship of the line
- Displacement: 3,069 tonneaux
- Tons burthen: 1,537 port tonneaux
- Length: 55.87 m (183 ft 4 in)
- Beam: 14.46 m (47 ft 5 in)
- Draught: 7.15 m (23.5 ft)
- Depth of hold: 7.15 m (23 ft 5 in)
- Sail plan: Full-rigged ship
- Crew: 705
- Armament: 74 guns: Lower gun deck: 28 × 36 pdr guns; Upper gun deck: 30 × 18 pdr guns; Forecastle and Quarterdeck: 16 × 8 pdr guns

Impétueux was a 74-gun Téméraire-class ship of the line built for the French Navy during the 1790s. Completed in 1803, she played a minor role in the Napoleonic Wars.

== Description ==
Designed by Jacques-Noël Sané, the Téméraire-class ships had a length of 55.87 metres (183 ft 4 in), a beam of 14.46 metres (47 ft 5 in) and a depth of hold of 7.15 metres (23 ft 5 in). The ships displaced 3,069 tonneaux and had a mean draught of 7.15 metres (23 ft 5 in). They had a tonnage of 1,537 port tonneaux. Their crew numbered 705 officers and ratings during wartime. They were fitted with three masts and ship rigged.

The muzzle-loading, smoothbore armament of the Téméraire class consisted of twenty-eight 36-pounder long guns on the lower gun deck and thirty 18-pounder long guns on the upper gun deck. On the quarterdeck and forecastle were a total of sixteen 8-pounder long guns. Beginning with the ships completed after 1787, the armament of the Téméraires began to change with the addition of four 36-pounder obusiers on the poop deck (dunette). Some ships had instead twenty 8-pounders.

== Construction and career ==
Impétueux was ordered on 31 May 1798 and laid down at the Arsenal de Lorient on 22 September. The ship was named on 19 December as Brutus. She was launched on 24 January 1803 and renamed Impétueux on 5 February. The ship was completed the following month. Impétueux served in the Caribbean under Jean-Baptiste Philibert Willaumez during the Atlantic campaign of 1806. On 19 August 1806, Impétueux was dismasted in a storm and drifted until 10 September 1806. On 14 September 1806, she was chased by Sir Richard John Strachan's Royal Navy squadron comprising HMS Belleisle, HMS Bellona and HMS Melampus; unable to fight, she was beached in Chesapeake Bay. Her wreck was set ablaze by the British and the crew was taken prisoner.

== Bibliography ==
- Roche, Jean-Michel (2005). Dictionnaire des bâtiments de la flotte de guerre française de Colbert à nos jours [Dictionary of French Warships from Colbert to Today]. Vol. 1: 1671-1870. Roche. ISBN 978-2-9525917-0-6. OCLC 165892922.
- Winfield, Rif and Roberts, Stephen S. (2015) French Warships in the Age of Sail 1786-1861: Design, Construction, Careers and Fates. Seaforth Publishing. ISBN 978-1-84832-204-2
