= HMS Jupiter (1778) =

Fourth-rate ship of the line of the Royal Navy

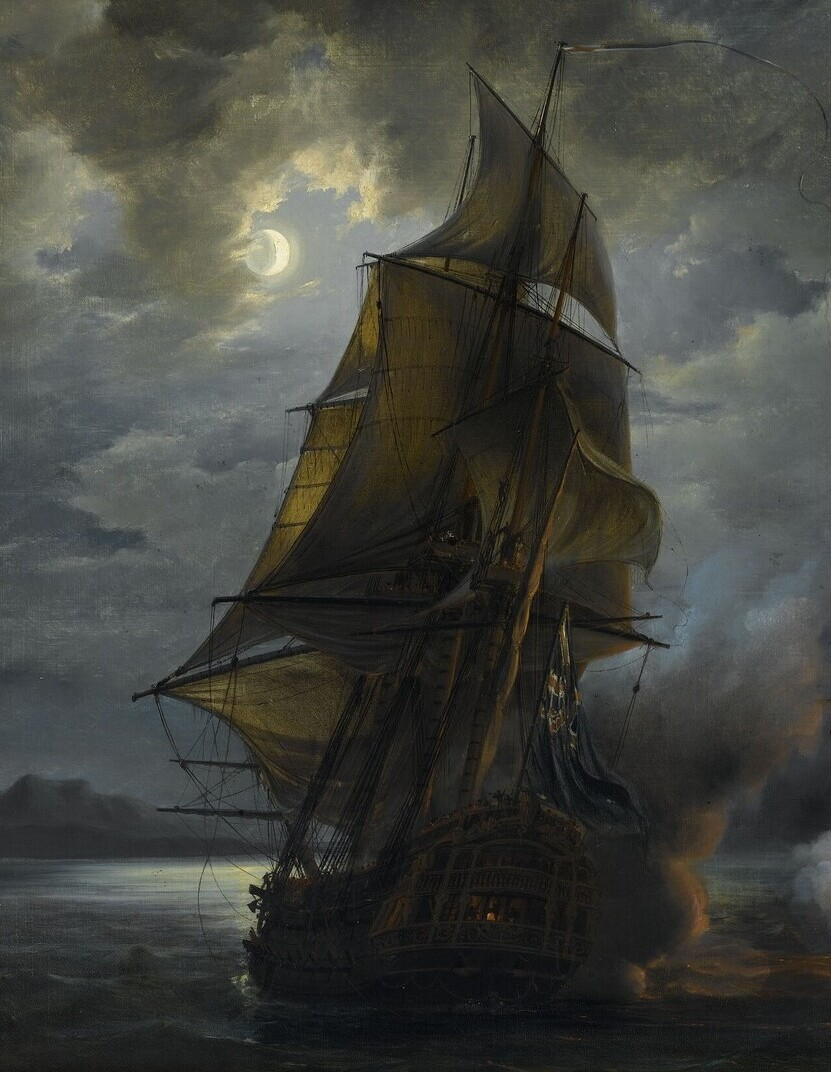
- Jupiter at the action of 20 October 1778

History

Great Britain
- Name: HMS Jupiter
- Ordered: 21 June & 1 July 1776
- Builder: John Randall & Co, Rotherhithe
- Laid down: July 1776
- Launched: 13 May 1778
- Completed: By 26 July 1778
- Fate: Wrecked on 10 December 1808

General characteristics
- Class & type: 50-gun Portland-class fourth rate
- Tons burthen: 1,061 30/94 (bm)
- Length: 146 ft 1 1/2 in (44.5 m) (overall); 119 ft 8 in (36.5 m) (keel)
- Beam: 40 ft 10 in (12.4 m)
- Depth of hold: 17 ft 6 in (5.3 m)
- Propulsion: Sails
- Sail plan: Full-rigged ship
- Complement: 350
- Armament: Lower deck: 22 × 24-pounder guns; Upper deck: 22 × 12-pounder guns; QD: 4 × 6-pounder guns; Fc: 2 × 6-pounder guns

HMS Jupiter was a 50-gun fourth-rate ship of the line of the Royal Navy. She served in the American War of Independence, French Revolutionary Wars and Napoleonic Wars in a career that spanned 30 years. She was also one of the fastest ships in the Royal Navy as shown by her attempt to capture the American cutter Eclipse under Nathaniel Fanning.

== Construction ==
Built in Rotherhithe, Jupiter was launched in 1778. Her trial copper sheathed hull featured the new technical breakthrough of protecting her iron bolts by the application of thick paper between the copper plates and the hull. This innovation she trialled successfully.

== Service history ==
On 20 October 1778, Jupiter, together with the frigate Medea fought an indecisive action with the 64-gun French Triton. Jupiter lost 3 killed with 7 men wounded. On 1 April 1779, under the command of Francis Reynolds, Jupiter assisted Delight after Delight captured the French 20-gun privateer Jean Bart.

On 2 October 1779, Jupiter captured two French cutters, each of 14 guns and 120 men. The Royal Navy took both into service essentially under their existing names. One was Mutin, under the command of Chevalier de Roquefeuil. She was pierced for 16 guns but carried 14, either 4 or 6-pounders. The other was Pilote, under the command of Chevalier de Clonard. She carried the same armament as Mutine (or Mutin). The cutters surrendered after an engagement that left Mutin dismasted. Jupiter shared the prize money with HMS Glory and Apollo, Crescent, and Milford. Jupiter fought at the battle of Porto Praya in 1781.

On 28 March 1795, Princess Caroline of Brunswick and James Harris, 1st Earl of Malmesbury left Cuxhaven on the Jupiter en route to London. Delayed by poor weather, they arrived a week later, on Easter Sunday, 5 April.

Jupiter fought at the Battle of Muizenberg in 1795, winning the battle honour 'Cape of Good Hope' for the latter. In 1799 Jupiter battled a French frigate in the aftermath of the Battle of Algoa Bay.

On 25 April 1799 Jupiter, Adamant, and Tremendous recaptured Chance as she lay at anchor under the guns of the battery at Connonies-Point, Île de France. The French frigate Forte had captured Chance, which was carrying a cargo of rice, in Balasore Roads. The squadron also recaptured another ship that a French privateer had captured in the Bay of Bengal. Lastly, after the French had driven the American ship Pacific onshore at River Noir, Adamant, Jupiter, and Tremendous came on the scene and sent in their boats, which removed much of Pacific's cargo of bale goods and sugar. The British then set Pacific on fire.

On 17 September 1801 Jupiter arrived at Cape Town from Rio de Janeiro, together with Hindostan and Euphrosyne, after a voyage of about a month. Lion had escorted a convoy of East Indiamen bound for China to Rio, together with Hindostan. They had arrived there on 1 August. Captain George Losack, of Jupiter, decided to accompany the convoy eastward until they were unlikely to encounter some Spanish and French vessels known to be cruising off Brazil.

Jupiter shared with Diomede, Hindostan, and Braave in the capture of Union on 27 May 1803.

On 27 February 1806, an accidental fire broke out aboard Jupiter while she was at Port Royal, Jamaica. She was scuttled to extinguish the fire. She was subsequently refloated, repaired, and returned to service.

On 18 April 1807 she sailed from Portsmouth as escort to a fleet of East Indiamen bound for India and China, though she would not accompany them all the way. On 15 June they were at 5°10′N 22°30′W "all well". However, Surat Castle had become leaky and it was determined that she should go into a port.

== Fate ==
Jupiter was wrecked on 10 December 1808 in Vigo Bay on the coast of Spain, but all her crew were saved. A transport was lost there at about the same time.

Captain the Honourable Henry Barker approached Vigo Harbour towards the end of dusk. He decided to anchor as close to the harbour as possible in order to be able to come in early the next morning. As she was coming into position she hit a reef. Attempts to lighten her by throwing shot and stores overboard had no effect, and she was taking on so much water the fear was that if she were heaved off she would sink. Over the next two days stores were removed. She then fell on her starboard side and was left a wreck. The subsequent court martial admonished Captain Barker to be more careful in the future.
