= Auguste Étienne François Mayer =

French painter (1805–1890)

Auguste Étienne François Mayer (3 July 1805 – 22 September 1890) was a French painter and lithographer who specialized in marine art, especially ships and naval battles. He participated in several Arctic scientific expeditions and painted scenes from these expeditions. He first exhibited an oil painting at the Paris Salon in 1824 and continued to exhibit there regularly through 1869.

Mayer traveled in the Netherlands, Sweden, Iceland and Norway and toured Turkey and Egypt in the company of Adrien Dauzats and Isidore Taylor. He taught drawing at the École Navale, holding an appointment as a professor. He became a Chevalier in the Legion of Honour on 2 January 1839 and rose to Officer of the Legion in 1867. He was born in Brest in 1805 and died there in 1890.

== Gallery ==
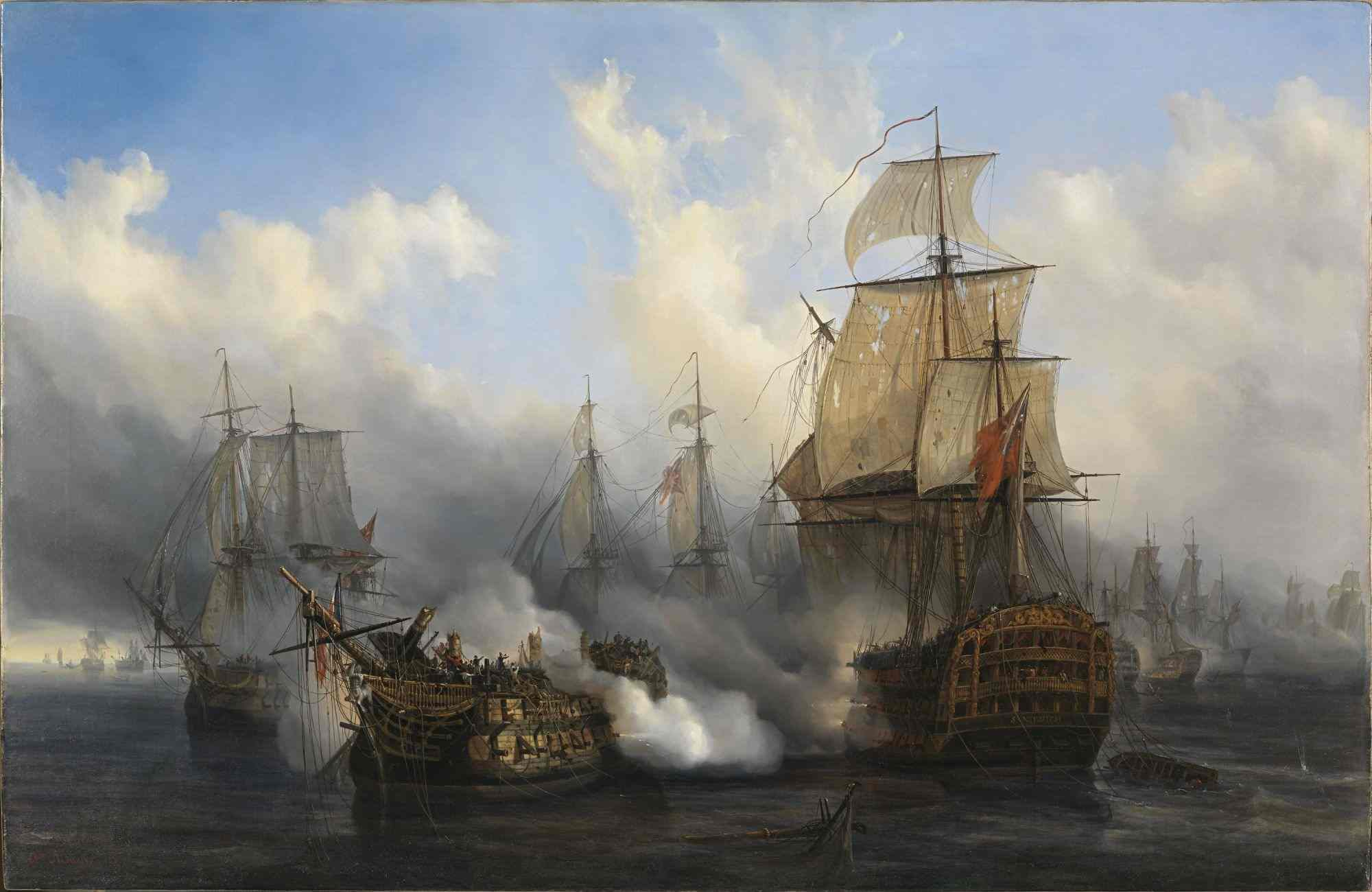
Glorious battle of the ship Bucentaure against three English ships, 21 October 1805 (1836)

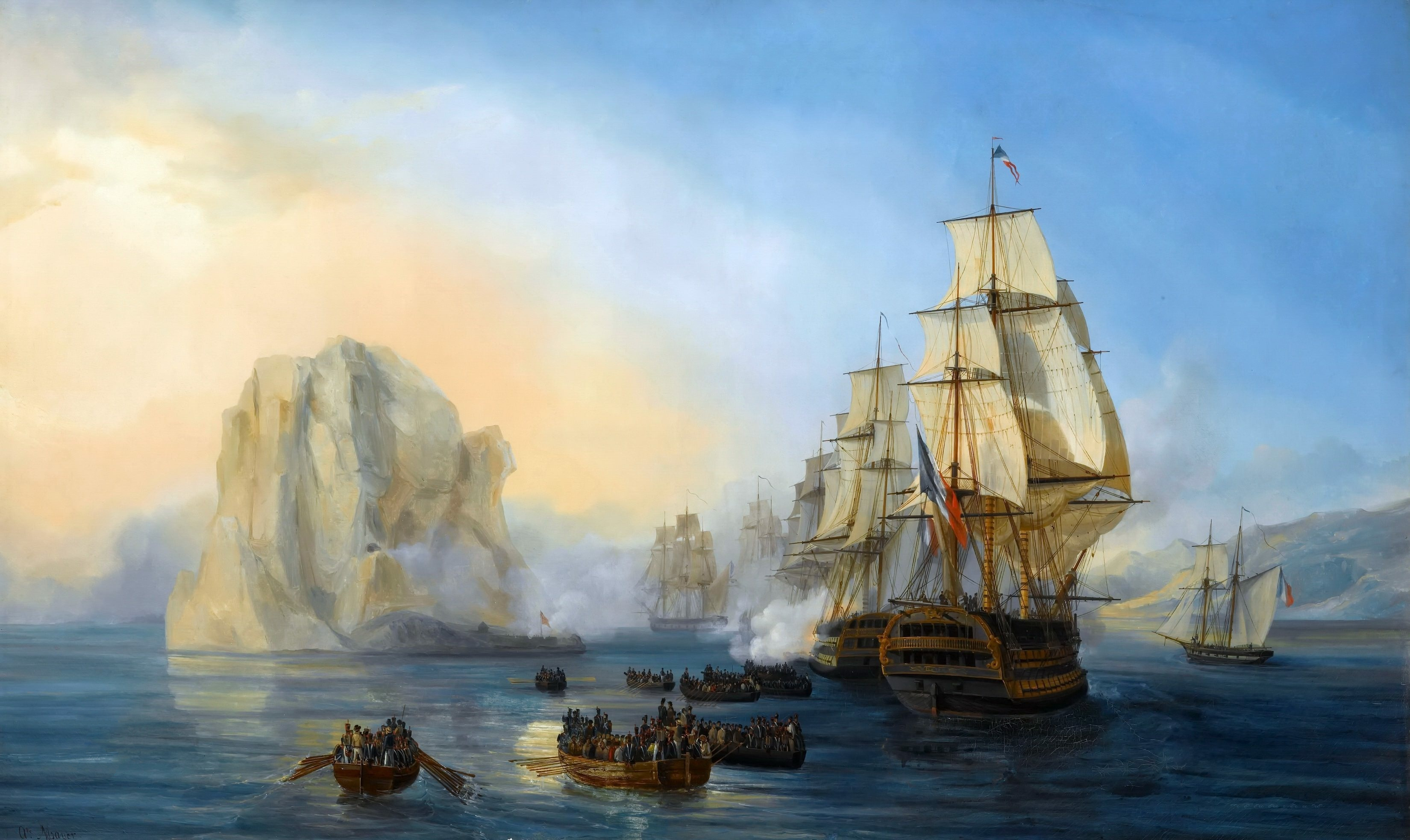
Taking of the Diamond Rock, near Martinique, 2 June 1805 (1837)

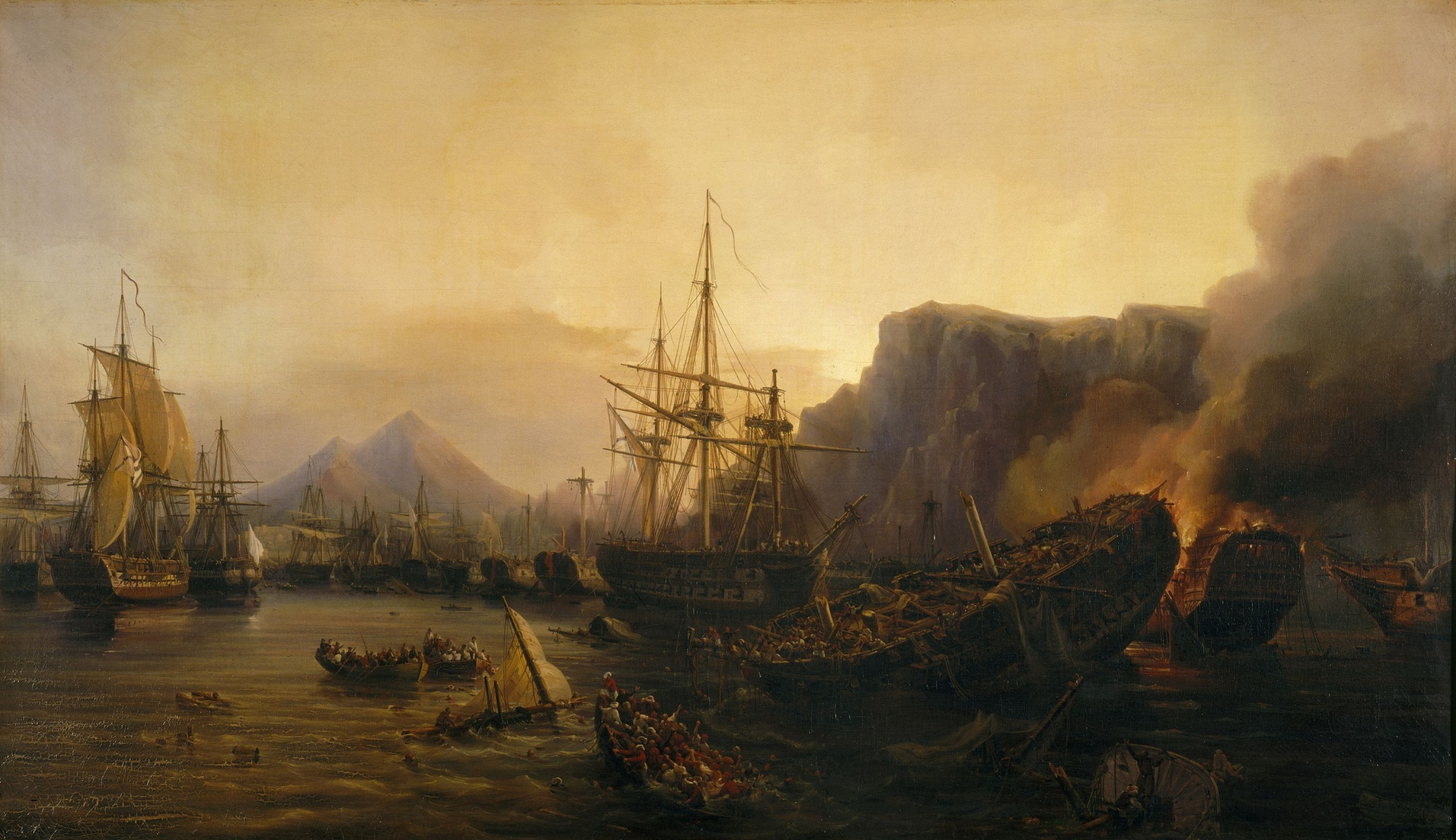
The evening of the Battle of Navarino, 1827 (1840)

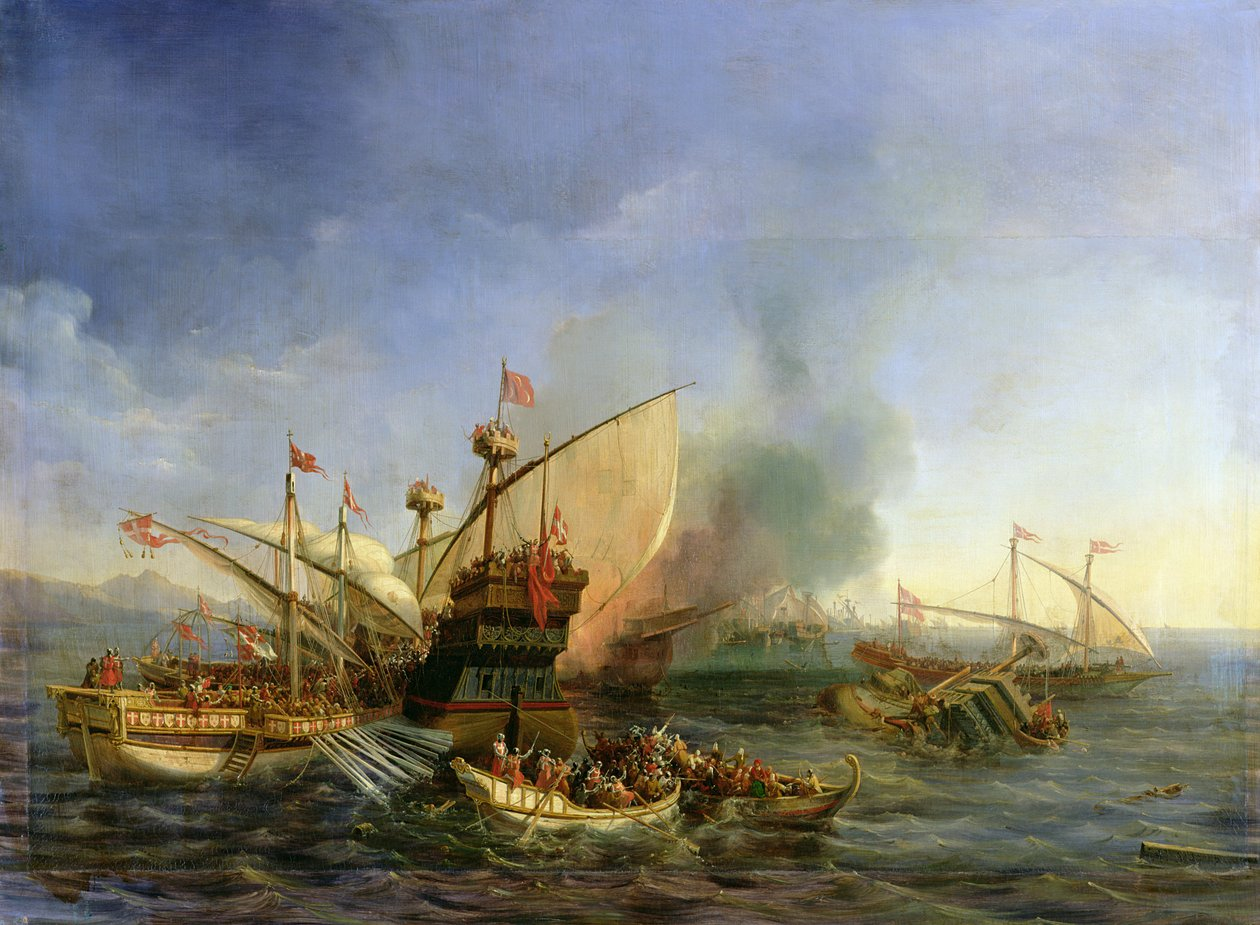
Naval Battle of Episkopi in 1323 (1841)

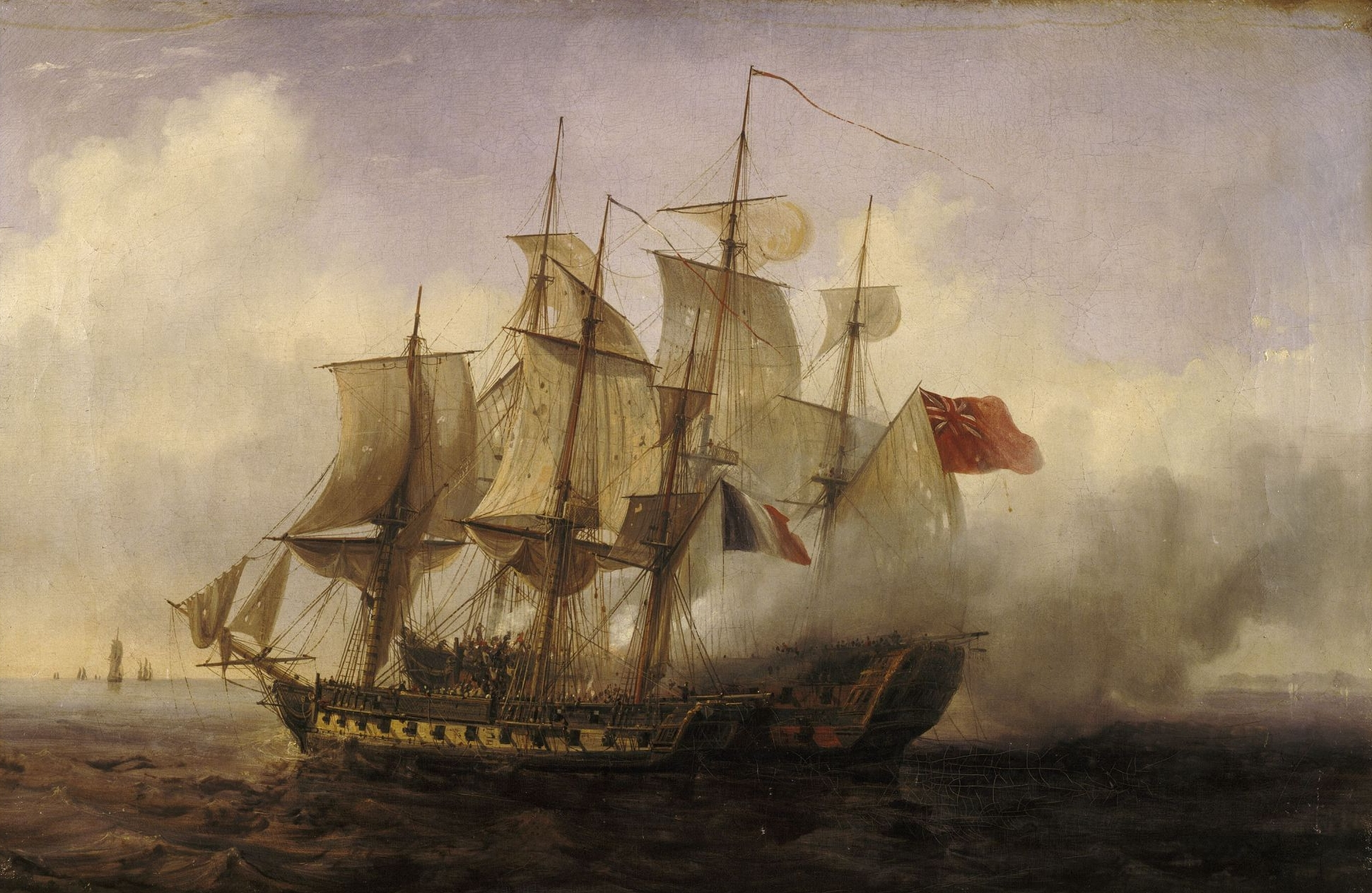
Capture of the English ship Nelson, of 50 18-pounder guns, by the Bordeaux privateer Bellone, of 32 8-pounder guns, on 13 August 1804 (1846)

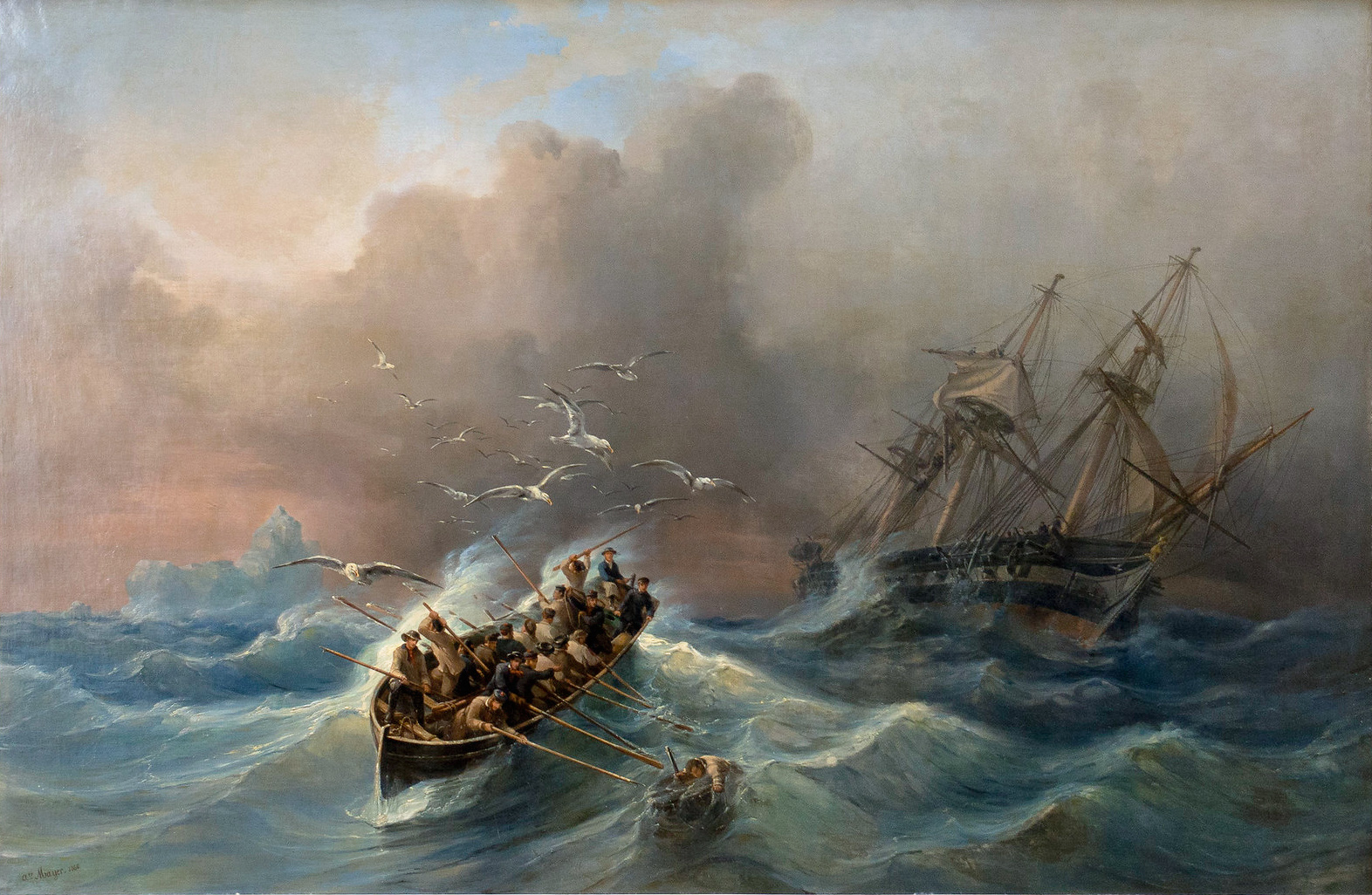
The frigate Herminie (1860)

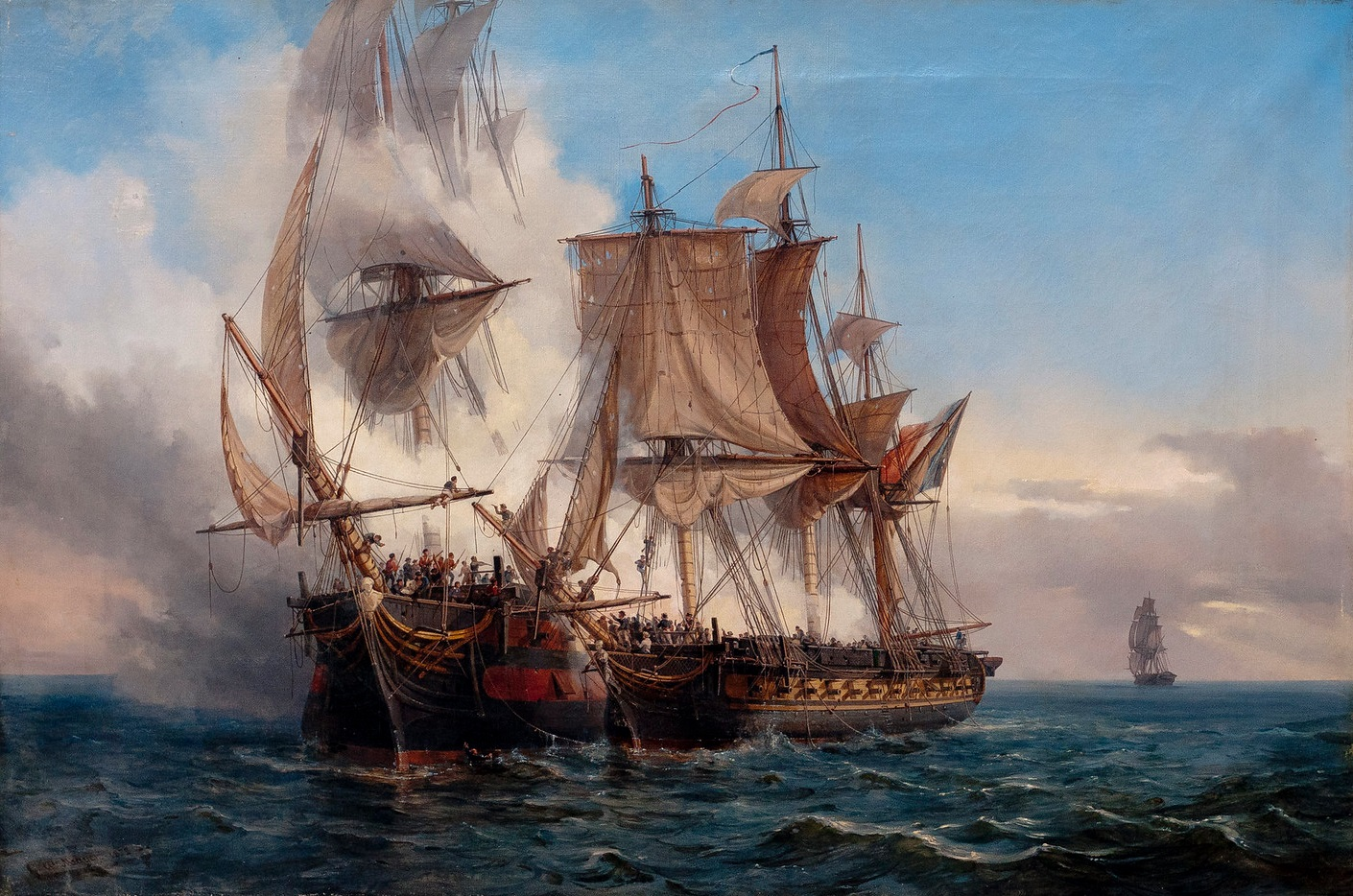
The capture of the Lord Nelson by the French privateer Bellone, on 14 August 1803 (1872)
