= Action of 5 May 1794 =

Minor naval engagement during the French Revolutionary Wars

- Part of the French Revolutionary Wars
Date	5 May 1794
Location	Off Île de France, Indian Ocean
Result	British victory

Belligerents
Great Britain	France

Commanders and leaders
Captain Henry Newcome	

Strength
Frigate HMS Orpheus, distantly supported by HMS Centurion and HMS Resistance	Frigate Duguay Trouin and brig Vulcain

Casualties and losses
1 killed, 9 wounded	21 killed, 60 wounded, Duguay Trouin captured

The action of 5 May 1794 was a minor naval engagement fought in the Indian Ocean during the French Revolutionary Wars. A British squadron had been blockading the French island of Isle de France (now Mauritius) since early in the year, and early on 5 May discovered two ships approaching their position. As the strange vessels came closer, they were recognised as the French frigate Duguay Trouin, which had been captured from the East India Company the year before, and a small brig. Making use of a favourable wind, the British squadron gave chase to the new arrivals, which fled. The chase was short, as Duguay Trouin was a poor sailor with many of the crew sick and unable to report for duty. The British frigate HMS Orpheus was the first to arrive, and soon completely disabled the French frigate, successfully raking the wallowing ship. After an hour and twenty minutes the French captain surrendered, Captain Henry Newcome of Orpheus taking over the captured ship and bringing his prize back to port in India.

== Background ==
Britain joined the French Revolutionary Wars in February 1793, but the news did not reach the Indian Ocean for four months. The immediate priority of the British squadron under Commodore William Cornwallis in British India was the capture of the French colonies in India, especially their main port of Pondicherry. Once the British had completed this operation at the end of August 1793, the squadron returned to Europe. This left British commerce in Eastern waters badly exposed, and privateers and warships operating from Isle de France captured a number of merchant vessels, including the large East Indiaman Princess Royal, which three privateer corvettes seized on 27 September in the Sunda Strait.

Princess Royal was a well-armed ship, carrying twenty-six 12-pounder cannon and a number of smaller calibre guns on the maindeck. The French Navy immediately took her into service as the 34-gun frigate Duguay Trouin and attached her to the Isle de France squadron of the frigates Prudente and Cybèle, and the brig Vulcain under Captain Jean-Marie Renaud. This force skirmished inconclusively with a squadron of East India Company ships in the Sunda Strait in January 1794, before returning to Isle de France with the captured East Indiaman Pigot.

By the early spring of 1794, three vessels had come out from Britain – 32-gun frigate HMS Orpheus under Captain Henry Newcome, the 50-gun fifth rate HMS Centurion under Captain Samuel Osbourne, and the 44-gun HMS Resistance under Captain Edward Pakenham to replace Cornwallis's squadron. These ships passed the French bases on Isle de France en route to India, and briefly blockaded the port with some success against French merchant vessels: Orpheus alone sent three officers and twenty men to India in captured merchant ships. The French too had ships at sea during this period, Duguay Trouin and Vulcain cruising together in the Indian Ocean during the spring before returning to Isle de France.

== Battle ==
As the French vessels approached the island on 5 May they were sighted by lookouts on the British squadron. The British captains then waited for the French to get closer, launching a chase in the mid-morning when they held the weather gage so that the wind was behind them. This allowed them to rapidly close with the French vessels whose efforts to escape were hampered by Duguay Trouin's poor sailing qualities. At 11:45, Orpheus was the first to reach the French frigate, firing on Duguay Trouin from long range. Within ten minutes the British ship had pulled closer to the former East Indiaman and although Duguay Trouin briefly returned fire, Orpheus was soon positioned across the starboard quarter of the French ship, allowing Newcome to pour raking fire into the Duguay Trouin without reply.

By 13:15, Duguay Trouin was a battered wreck, with the hull significantly damaged, the bowsprit shot away and heavy casualties among the crew. With his ship unmanageable and Centurion and Resistance now 3 nautical miles (5.6 km) away and approaching rapidly, the French captain struck his colours and surrendered. The brig Vulcain had taken the opportunity to escape as Duguay Trouin and Orpheus fought and later reached Isle de France. Newcome lost one midshipman killed and one officer and eight men wounded in the exchange from a crew of 194. Losses on Duguay Trouin were far more severe: the French ship recorded 21 men killed and 60 wounded from a nominal complement of 403.

== Aftermath ==
Newcome initially took his prize to Mahé in the Seychelles, where he demanded fresh supplies, particularly water, for his prisoners. The French governors of the islands refused, and Newcome stormed and seized the town, taking all of the supplies and military stores. The wounded and sick prisoners were disembarked, and the contents of a small French brig were turned over to the inhabitants to replace the seized supplies. Newcome then returned to India with his prize, but the ship was not subsequently purchased by the Royal Navy.

Historical reaction to the battle has focused on the significantly stronger British position in the encounter, with three large regular warships pitted against a hastily converted merchant vessel with a significant proportion of the crew suffering from illness. Duguay-Trouin was also weakly built and weakly armed: early estimates that the Duguay Trouin's main battery mounted twenty-six 18-pounder long guns were revised to 12-pounders with eight smaller cannon on the upper deck. The British blockade of Isle de France continued throughout the year, with Centurion engaged in an inconclusive action against a French squadron in October. Although Isle de France remained in French hands throughout the conflict, the Indian Ocean was largely under British control by 1796.

== Bibliography ==
- Brenton, Edward Pelham (1823). The Naval History of Great Britain, Vol. I. London: Henry Colburn.
- Clowes, William Laird (1997) [1900]. The Royal Navy, A History from the Earliest Times to 1900, Volume IV. London: Chatham Publishing. ISBN 1-86176-013-2.
- Gardiner, Robert, ed. (2001) [1998]. The Victory of Seapower. Caxton Editions. ISBN 1-84067-359-1.
- James, William (2002) [1827]. The Naval History of Great Britain, Volume 1, 1793–1796. London: Conway Maritime Press. ISBN 0-85177-905-0.
