= Bali Strait incident =

1797 battle of the East Indies theatre of the French Revolutionary Wars

- Part of the East Indies theatre of the French Revolutionary Wars
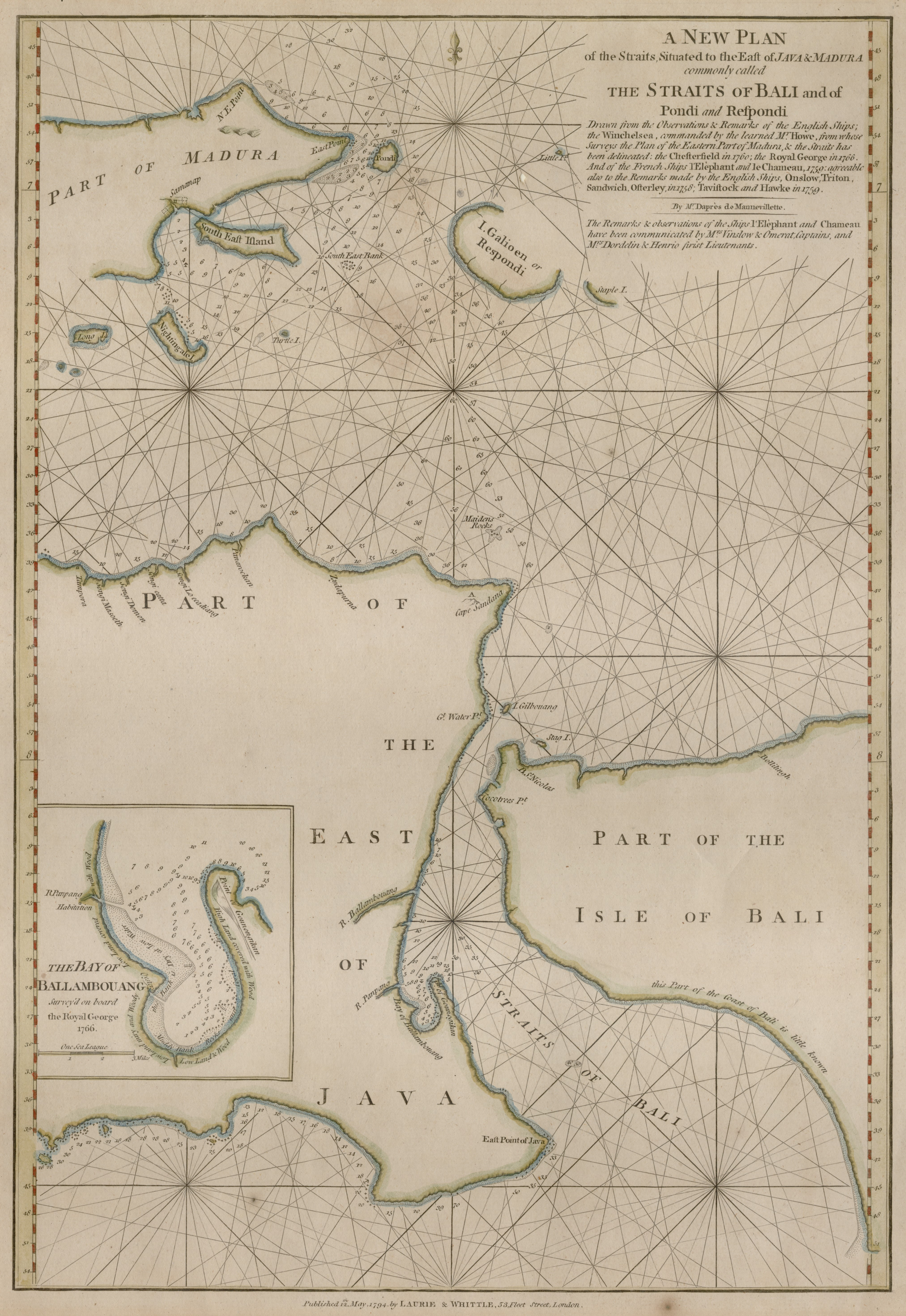
- 1794 map of the Bali Strait
| Date | 28 January 1797 |
| Location | Bali Strait |
| Result | British victory |

Belligerents
| East India Company | France |

Commanders and leaders
| James Farquharson | Pierre César Charles de Sercey |

Strength
| Six East Indiamen | Six frigates |

Casualties and losses
| None | None |

The Bali Strait incident was an encounter between a squadron of six French Navy frigates and six East Indiamen of the British East India Company (EIC) in the Bali Strait on 28 January 1797. The incident took place amidst the East Indies campaign of the French Revolutionary Wars — repeated French attempts to disrupt the highly valuable British trade routes with British India and Qing Dynasty China.

In 1796, a large squadron of French frigates arrived in the Indian Ocean under the command of Contre-amiral Pierre César Charles de Sercey. In July this force sailed on a commerce raiding cruise off British Ceylon, but a subsequent attack into the Straits of Malacca was driven off in an inconclusive engagement with two British ships of the line off Northeastern Sumatra. Forced to make repairs, Sercey took his squadron to the allied Batavian city of Batavia, sheltering there until January 1797.

As Sercey left Batavia he turned eastward along the northern coast of Java to avoid the British commander in the region, Admiral Peter Rainier, who was escorting four ships through the Straits of Malacca to the west. However six East Indiamen were sailing to transit the Bali Strait on their way to China. On 28 January, at the entrance to the Strait, Sercey's squadron and the East Indiamen met. The EIC Commodore, James Farquharson, captain of Alfred, knew that if he fled the French would rapidly overwhelm his ships so he decided to try a bluff. He would attempt to lead Sercey into believing that the convoy was formed not from lightly armed East Indiamen, but from the powerful ships of the line that the Indiamen resembled. Farquharson ordered his ships to advance in line of battle.

Sercey, under orders not to risk his squadron, and fearing that he was facing a superior force, retreated, declining to risk a battle. Sercey did momentarily reconsider when the British ships equally declined to attack the temporarily disabled frigate Forte, but eventually withdrew completely. He retired to his base at Île de France (now Mauritius), where he learned of his error. The East Indiamen reached Whampoa Anchorage having lost only one ship, which wrecked in the Flores Sea in a storm the day after the encounter.

== Background ==
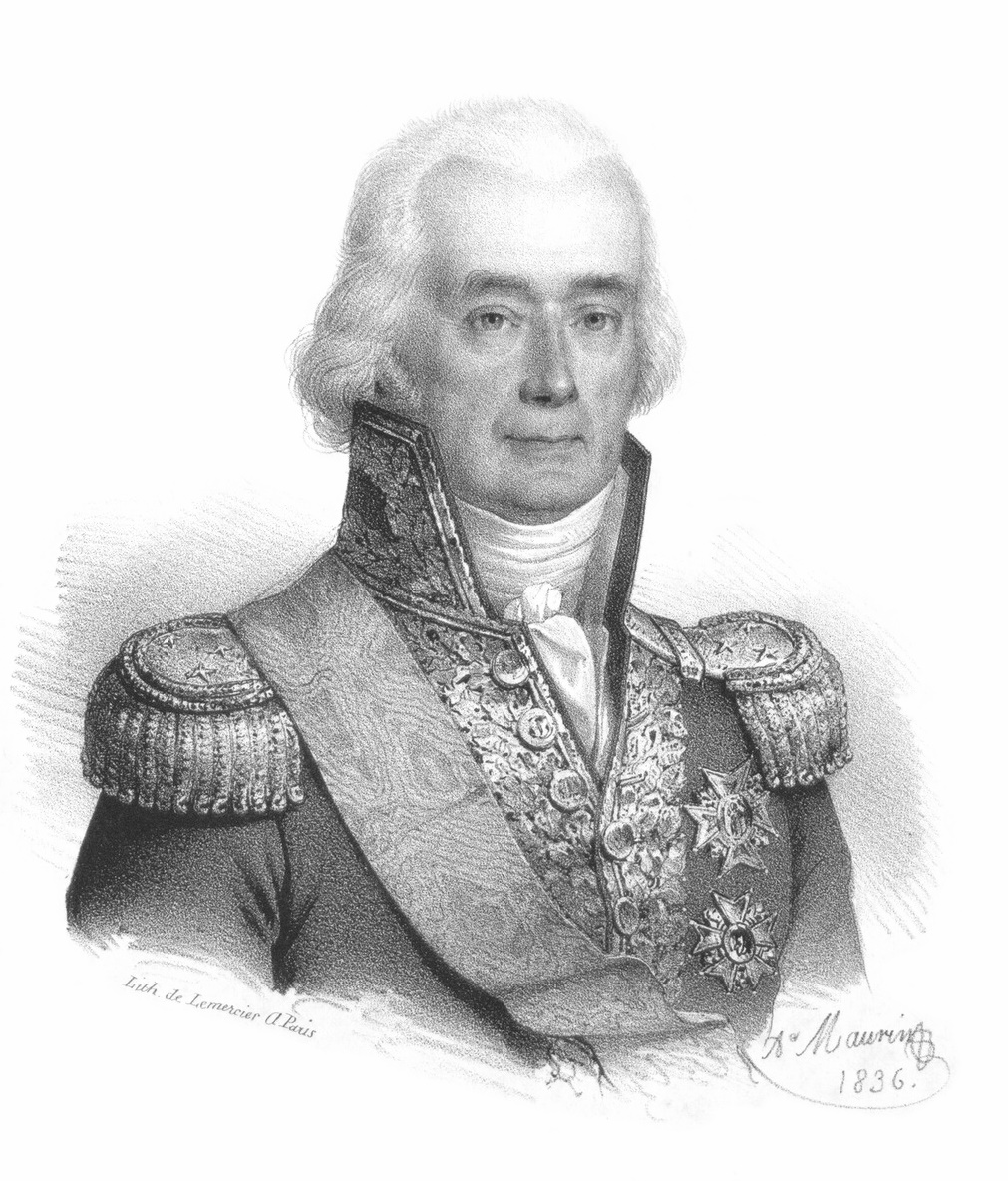
Pierre César Charles de Sercey, the French commander during the incident

Trade through the East Indies was a vital component of the economy of Great Britain during the late eighteenth century. The East India Company, which maintained trading ports throughout the region, most notably in British India at Bombay, Madras, and Calcutta, had a legal monopoly on the trade between the region and Britain. The bulk of this trade was carried on large merchant ships known as East Indiamen, which had burthens between 500 and 1200 tons (bm), and carried up to 36 cannon. Due to their size and weaponry they could be mistaken for ships of the line, standard large warships of the period, a deception usually augmented by paintwork and dummy cannon. Despite their appearance however they could not fight off an enemy frigate or ship of the line as their guns were lighter in weight and weight of shot than those of similarly sized warships, and their crew smaller and less well trained than those on a naval ship, and largely composed of lascars.

An important component of the East India trade was an annual convoy from Canton. Each year, a large convoy of East Indiamen would gather at Canton, in order to sail in convoy through the Indian Ocean and the Atlantic to Britain. The value of the trade carried in this convoy, nicknamed the "China Fleet", was enormous: one convoy in 1804 was reported to be carrying goods worth over £8 million in contemporary values (the equivalent of £700,000,000 as of 2025).

By 1797, Britain and the new French Republic had been engaged in the French Revolutionary Wars for nearly four years. Although there had been significant fighting in Europe, the East Indies had remained largely under British control. French forces in the region were limited, and apart from a few raiding cruises the French squadron in the region had been under intermittent blockade at Île de France. The Royal Navy, commanded in Eastern waters by Rear-Admiral Peter Rainier had focused on commerce protection and the elimination of the colonies of the French-allied Batavian Republic, capturing Dutch Ceylon, the Dutch Cape Colony and parts of the Dutch East Indies in 1795 and 1796. Rainier had been engaged in pacifying local uprisings around Malacca during the latter part of the campaign, and there had been few forces left in reserve to protect British interests in the Indian Ocean.

In response to British activity in the region and the reluctance of the inhabitants of Île de France to follow orders from the National Convention abolishing slavery, the French dispatched a squadron of frigates to the East Indies early in 1796. This force, led by Counter-admiral Pierre César Charles de Sercey, originally comprised three frigates, subsequently joined by three more vessels, forming a powerful raiding squadron. After resupplying on Île de France in July, Sercey's frigates cruised off the Ceylon coast, dissuaded from attacking the undefended ports of British India by false information fed to his scouts that a British battle squadron was at anchor in Calcutta. Turning eastwards, Sercey hoped to raid George Town at Penang, but was driven off in an inconclusive engagement with a British squadron off Sumatra on 9 September. He spent the winter sheltering in Batavia on Java.

== Incident ==
Sercey's presence in the East Indies was known to the East India Company committee at Canton, who requested assistance from Rainier. In response, the British admiral sailed to Macau in his flagship, the 74-gun ship of the line HMS Suffolk, with the sloop HMS Swift, and on 30 December met with four East Indiamen and two smaller "country ships" used for regional trade. Rainier elected to sail immediately, without waiting for the remainder of the convoy to assemble, escorting his small convoy through the Straits of Malacca during January reaching first Penang and then Madras by 13 February. Malacca was thought to be the most likely point for an ambush by the French squadron, and orders were issued by the committee for the remainder of the convoy, commanded by Captain Lestock Wilson (Exeter), to sail through either the Sape Strait, the Alas Strait, or the Bali Strait, which were thought to be safer than Malacca. Homeward bound, Exeter crossed the Second Bar on 1 January 1797, and was at Penang by 27 January.

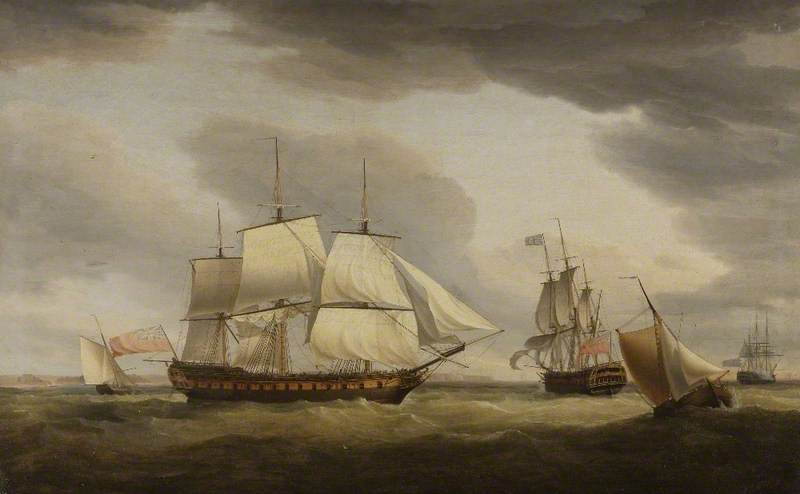
Taunton Castle (second from left), one of the British ships involved in the incident

Rainier did not meet Sercey, who had learned of the British plans and altered his own accordingly. Sailing from Batavia on 4 January, Sercey cruised the Java Sea in search of the China convoy, wary that Rainier might be searching for him in turn. On 28 January, as Sercey's ships passed southward through the Bali Strait in bad weather, sails were sighted. Sercey immediately ordered the frigate Cybèle under Captain Pierre Julien Tréhouart to reconnoitre the approaching ships.

The sails belonged to a convoy of Indiamen which had gathered in Colombo on Ceylon before sailing together to China. By choosing to come up through the Bali Strait rather than through the Straits of Malacca, Farquharson had inadvertently led his fleet directly into the path of a French squadron whose six frigates were easily more powerful than his six East Indiamen. Farquharson was aware that he could not win a naval engagement with six frigates and so resolved instead to bluff the French into thinking his merchant convoy was a squadron of ships of the line. When he saw Cybèle approaching, Farquharson brought two ships forward to meet the frigate, gambling that in the low light Tréhouart might mistake the East Indiamen for warships. Farquharson compounded his ruse by raising Rainier's Blue Ensign on Alfred and instructing the rest of the convoy to raise ensigns of their own.

The deception was so convincing that Tréhouart turned away well short of the British convoy, signalling to Sercey that "L'ennemi est supérieur aux forces Français" ("The enemy is superior in force to the French"). Sercey turned his squadron away, Cybèle passing close by the flagship Forte, Tréhouart hailing that the British ships comprised a battle squadron of two ships of the line and four frigates. Forte had lost its main topmast in the early stages of the retreat, and Sercey had noted that the British ships were not pursuing with the fervour expected of a superior force encountering a weaker one, but Tréhouart's declaration convinced him he was outnumbered and he ordered his squadron to withdraw.

=== Orders of battle ===
East India Company fleet
| Ship | Guns | Commander | Arrived Colombo | Arrived Whampoa | Notes |
| Alfred | 26 | Captain James Farquharson | 28 November 1796 | 8 April 1797 | Commodore of the fleet |
| Boddam' | 32 | Captain George Palmer | 30 November 1796 | 8 April 1797 | |
| Canton | 26 | Captain Abel Vyvyan | 29 November 1796 | 9 April 1797 | |
| Ocean | 26 | Captain Andrew Patton | 7 December 1796 | | Wrecked on 1 February |
| Taunton Castle | 36 | Captain Edward Studd | 9 December 1796 | 8 April 1797 | |
| Woodford | 36 | Captain Charles Lennox | 9 December 1796 | 6 April 1797 | |
Sources: Biden 1830, p. 210, James 2002b, Vol. 2, p.79, voyage records of the vessels, and letters of marque issued to the vessels.

Admiral Sercey's squadron (France)
| Ship | Guns | Commander | Notes |
|---|---|---|---|
| Forte | 44 | Contre-amiral Pierre César Charles de Sercey; Captain Hubert Le Loup de Beaulieu | Flagship; lost maintopmast during retreat |
| Cybèle | 40 | Captain Pierre Julien Tréhouart | Scouting frigate – made erroneous identification |
| Régénérée | 40 | Captain Jean-Baptiste Philibert Willaumez | |
| Vertu | 40 | Captain Jean-Matthieu-Adrien Lhermitte | |
| Seine | 38 | Lieutenant Julien-Gabriel Bigot | |
| Prudente | 32 | Captain Charles René Magon de Médine | |
Source: James 2002b, Vol. 2, p.79

== Aftermath ==
Clearing the strait, Farquharson turned the convoy into the Java Sea, where a storm drove Ocean onto a reef at Pulau Kalaotoa in the Lesser Sunda Islands the day after the incident, wrecking the ship. Three men drowned during the evacuation, and the local Makassar inhabitants killed another seven in an attack on 15 February. The survivors departed on hired proas three days later, reaching Amboyna safely on 28 February. The five surviving East Indiamen arrived at Whampoa Anchorage between 6 and 9 April, there taking on valuable cargo.

On the homeward voyage from China, a storm damaged Taunton Castle and forced the ship to stop at Amboyna on 16 September 1797. There she embarked the survivors from Ocean; Taunton Castle reached Yarmouth on 7 February 1798, in a disabled state. The EIC thanked Farquharson and awarded him 500 guineas.

Sercey retired with his frigates to Île de France, where he learned to his horror of the opportunity he had missed in the Bali Strait. His squadron required extensive repairs, but the Colonial Committee on Île de France remained rebellious over attempts to abolish slavery and denied his ships men and food supplies. Eventually Sercey was forced to disband his squadron, sending four frigates back to France. Seven years after the Bali Strait Incident, in 1804, early in the Napoleonic Wars, another strong French naval squadron encountered a much larger China Fleet at the Battle of Pulo Aura. As in 1797, Nathaniel Dance, the EIC Commodore, managed to bluff the French admiral into believing there were warships among his convoy and the French retired after a brief exchange of gunfire.

== Notes ==
1. Most British histories, such as Brenton, and Clowes, follow James, in incorrectly naming Captain Charles Lennox of Woodford as the commander of this fleet. However Biden states that Lennox was confined below decks due to ill-health, and reports that Captain James Farquharson was the actual Commodore.
2. Some British histories, such as Parkinson, who refers to the "homeward-bound China fleet", state that the EIC convoy was sailing from rather than to China. The accounts sourced in this article however demonstrate that this was an error, which appears to have been first published in 1827 by James, calling the convoy "homeward bound".
