= Charles René Magon de Médine =

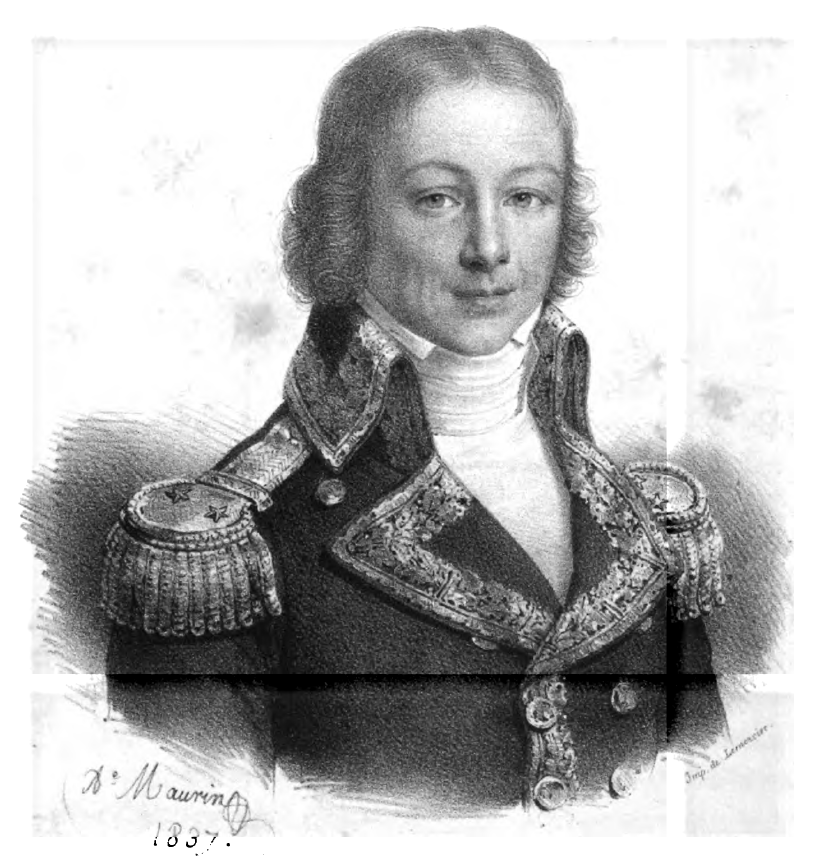
- Portrait by Antoine Maurin, 1835
- Born: 12 November 1763; Paris, France
- Died: 21 October 1805 (aged 41); Off Cape Trafalgar, Atlantic Ocean
- Military career
- Allegiance: Kingdom of France; French First Republic; First French Empire
- Branch: French Navy; French Imperial Navy
- Service years: 1777–1805
- Rank: Counter admiral
- Commands: Amphitrite; Minerve; Cybèle; Prudente; Vertu; Algésiras
- Conflicts: American Revolutionary War; Battle of Ushant (1778); Armada of 1779; Battle of the Chesapeake; Battle of Saint Kitts; Battle of the Saintes (surrendered); French Revolutionary Wars; Battle of Île Ronde; Action of 9 September 1796; Haitian Revolution; Saint-Domingue expedition; Napoleonic Wars; Napoleon's planned invasion of the United Kingdom; Battle of Cape Finisterre (1805); Battle of Trafalgar †

Signature
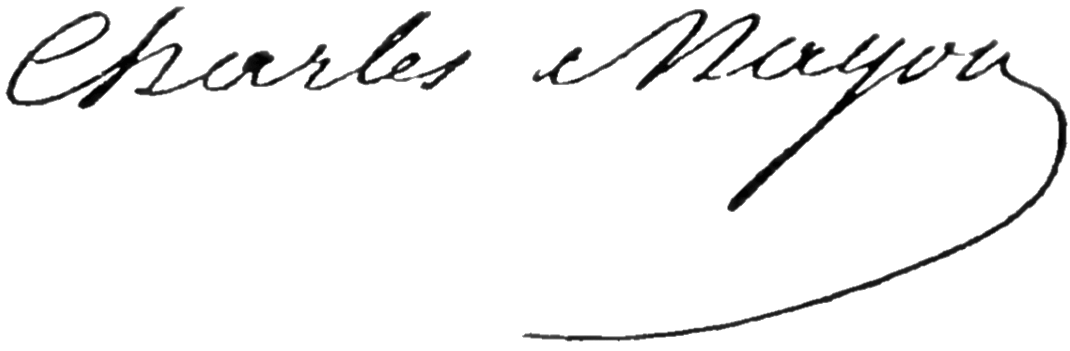

Counter-Admiral Charles René Magon de Médine (born Charles René Magon; 12 November 1763 – 21 October 1805) was a French Navy officer who served in the American Revolutionary War and French Revolutionary and Napoleonic Wars. He was killed in action at the Battle of Trafalgar while commanding Algésiras. As a posthumous reward, Magon's name was etched on the Arc de Triomphe.

== Early life ==
Charles René Magon was born on 12 November 1763 in Paris into a noble family based in Saint Malo. Magon joined the French Navy as a Gardes de la Marine in 1777. His father, René Magon de la Villebague, died in 1778 and left his son his slave plantation of Médine on Isle de France, from which Magon derived his full name. Magon fought at Battle of Ushant on 27 July 1778 on Bretagne before participating in the Armada of 1779 on Saint-Esprit. Promoted to ship-of-the-line ensign in 1780, Magon served in the Antilles on Solitaire in Luc Urbain du Bouëxic, comte de Guichen's squadron. He fought in three battles against Sir George Rodney's fleet off Dominica before serving in François Joseph Paul de Grasse's squadron on Caton, fighting at the battles of the Chesapeake, Saint Kitts and the Saintes, where Magon was captured before being released at the end of 1782.

In April 1783, Magon set out for the Indian Ocean on the frigate Surveillante, and spent the next 15 years there. On 1 May 1786, he was promoted to ship-of-the-line lieutenant and in November 1786 put in command of the frigate Amphitrite, with which he reasserted French control over Diego Garcia. On his return he served as second officer of the frigate Dryade then of the frigate Pandour, with which ships he served another 18 months in the seas off India and China.

== French Revolutionary Wars ==
In April 1788, Magon embarked as second officer onboard Dryade, before taking command of Minerve in June 1791 and Cybèle in November 1792. Due to being an aristocrat during the French Revolution he was arrested at Port Louis but quickly released, becoming an aide-de-camp to Anne Joseph Hippolyte de Maurès, Comte de Malartic, the governor-general of the Mascarene Islands. In 1793, he commanded Prudente in Jean-Marie Renaud's frigate division (also including Cybèle and Coureur), participating in the inconclusive Battle of Île Ronde against the British ships HMS Centurion and HMS Diomede off the Rivière Noire District on 22 October 1794.

Promoted to ship-of-the-line captain shortly afterwards, Magon then became the interim commander of French naval forces in the Indian Ocean (then amounting to three frigates and a corvette) until the arrival of a frigate squadron under Counter-admiral Pierre César Charles de Sercey. On Prudente, he served in further campaigns, sometimes alone, sometimes with the rest of the division - his notable battles of that period include the inconclusive action of 9 September 1796 between six of the division's frigates and the British ships of the line HMS Arrogant and HMS Victorious, in which Sercey refused to press home the advantage won by the French frigates.

In January 1798, Magon took command of Vertu and, alongside Régénérée, escorted two Spanish ships of the line back to Europe. En route, he fought off attacks by HMS Pearl off Guinea in April and HMS Brilliant in July. Arriving back in Europe, Magon was rewarded for his services by the Spanish, notably with a suit of armour, before continuing on to Rochefort. On arriving back in Paris he had his property confiscated due to being accused of colluding with Malartic in preventing the French Directory agents René-Gaston Baco de la Chapelle and Étienne-Laurent-Pierre Burnel from applying the Law of 4 February 1794 and abolishing slavery in Isle de France; the two agents were prevented from disembarking by Malartic and forced to return to France. Counter-admiral Étienne Eustache Bruix successfully campaigned for Magon's reinstatement, and a few months later, Magon was promoted to chef de division.

At first employed in Paris in reorganising the navy, then in inspecting mainland France's ports, in 1801 Magon was put back into active service, at first on Océan, then on Mont Blanc, the latter of which was made part of the naval contingent of the Saint-Domingue expedition under Vice-admiral Louis Thomas Villaret de Joyeuse, which departed France for Saint-Domingue in December 1801. Put in command of four ships of the line and two frigates and ordered to capture Fort Dauphin in February 1802, Magon captured the fort in such a swift and successful manner that the expedition's commander-in-chief Divisional-general Charles Leclerc immediately promoted him to counter admiral, stating in his report that his "nomination was on the army's unanimous wish, and I do not doubt that the government will confirm it", which it duly did in March 1802.

== Napoleonic Wars and death ==
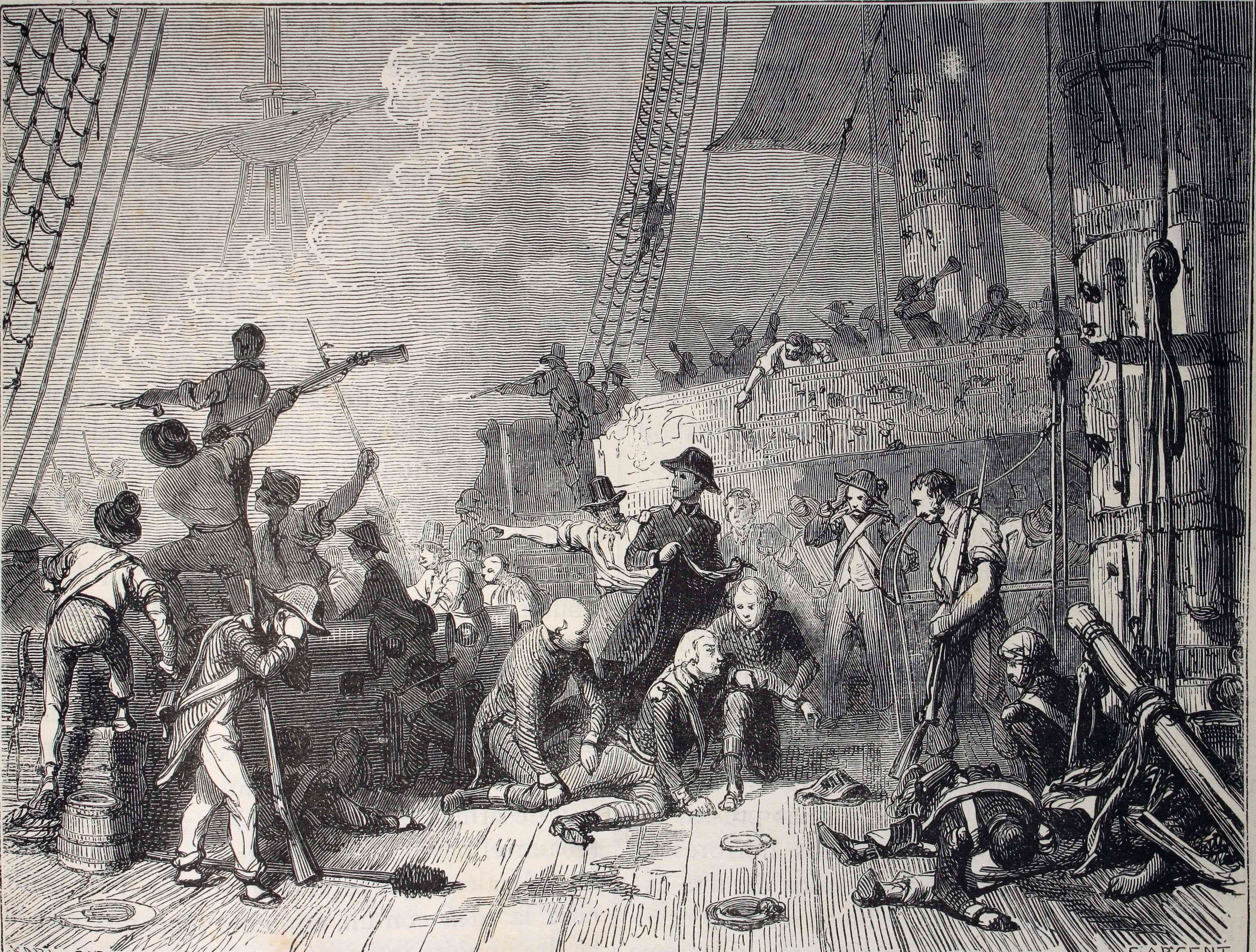
1879 illustration of Magon's death at Trafalgar

In 1803, Bruix summoned Magon to Boulogne to command the right wing of the flotilla for Napoleon's planned invasion of the United Kingdom. On 11 December 1803, he was made a member of the Legion of Honour, rising to a commander in it on 14 June 1804. Napoleon ordered the flotilla to carry out an exercise and fleet review in the open sea. Magon considered this dangerous due to the bad weather, but Bruix refused to excuse him from it. It proved a disaster as Magon had predicted, with a storm destroying 30 barges. In the months that followed, Magon resisted several British attempts to destroy the flotilla.

In March 1805, Magon commanded a squadron at Rochefort that included the ships of the line Algésiras and Achille. He joined Vice-admiral Pierre-Charles Villeneuve in the Antilles and commanded the rearguard in the Battle of Cape Finisterre (July 1805) against Admiral Robert Calder's squadron. At the Battle of Trafalgar on 21 October, Magon was still on Algésiras as part of the Spanish Admiral Federico Gravina's light squadron, which was attacked by Cuthbert Collingwood's squadron. The crew of Algésiras was about to board HMS Tonnant when HMS Colossus and HMS Bellerophon came to their admiral's aid. Magon was wounded by musket balls twice but remained at his post and led the fighting for five hours before finally being killed by a third such ball just before his vessel was itself boarded and captured by the British.

== Images ==
- Geoffroy Dauvergne (1922–1977) was commissioned by the Mairie de Saint Servan to paint a portrait of Magon in 1960. Three versions of it exist - one in the Mairie de St Servan, one in the Musée de St Malo and one in a private collection.

== Sources ==
- Six, Georges (1934). "Magon de Médine (Charles René)". Dictionnaire biographique des généraux et amiraux français de la Révolution et de l'Empire: 1792–1814 (in French). Vol. 2. Paris: Librairie Historique et Nobilaire. p. 140.
- (in French) Thomazi (Auguste) : Les Marins de Napoléon, Tallandier, Paris 1978.
- (in French) Tulard (Jean) (sous la direction de) : Dictionnaire Napoléon, Librairie Arthème Fayard, Paris 1999
- (in French) Monaque (Rémi) : Trafalgar 21 octobre 1805, Tallandier, Paris 2005
- (in French) Dictionnaire des marins francs-maçons (ed. Jean Marc Van Hille), Éditions le Phare de Misaine, Nantes, 2008
