= HMS Centurion (1774) =

Fourth-rate ship of the line of the Royal Navy

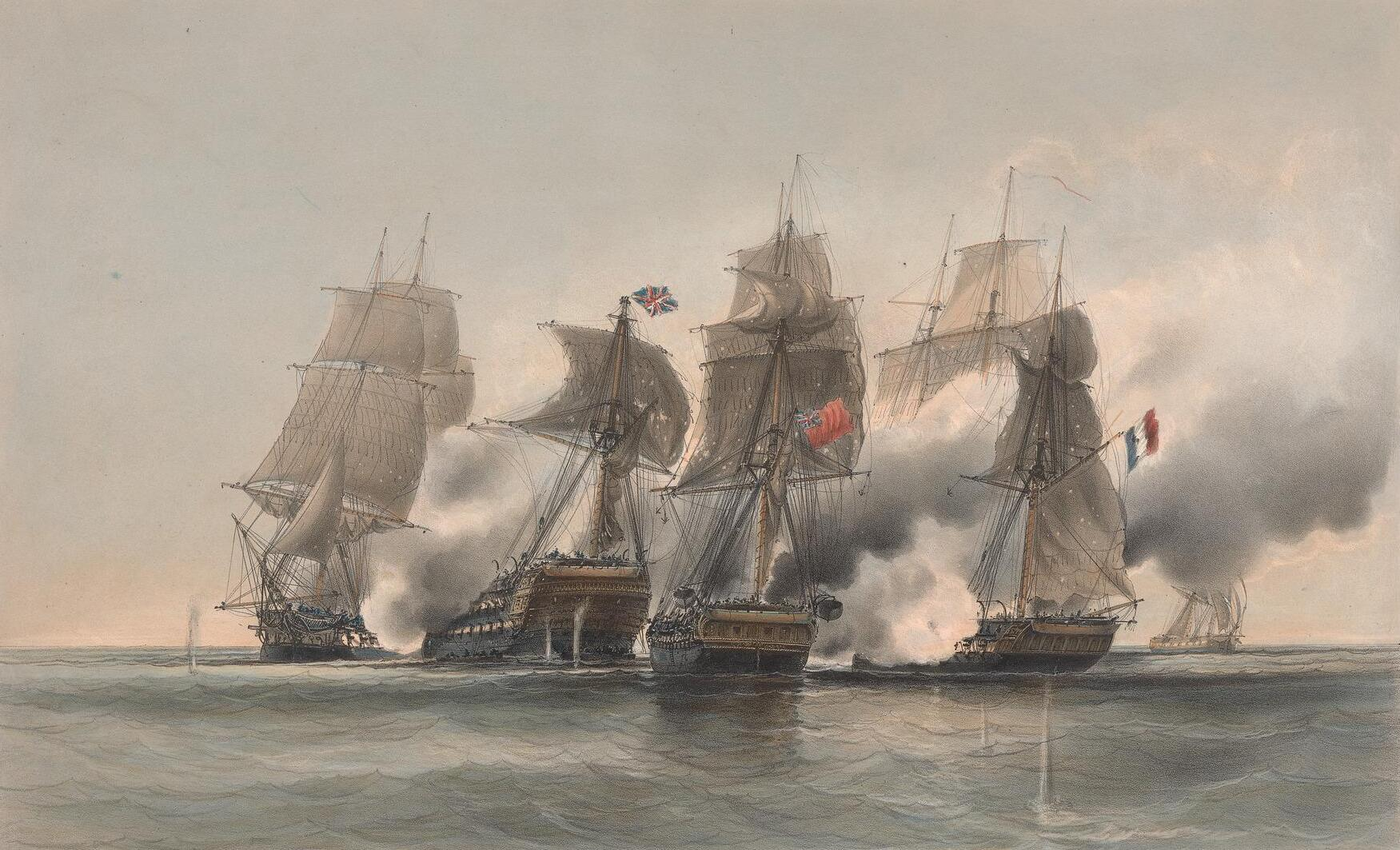
- Centurion (second from left) at the Battle of Île Ronde

History

Great Britain
- Name: HMS Centurion
- Ordered: 25 December 1770
- Builder: Barnard & Turner, Harwich
- Laid down: May 1771
- Launched: 22 May 1774
- Completed: By 9 September 1775
- Fate: Sank at moorings on 21 February 1824; Raised and broken up in 1825

General characteristics
- Class & type: 50-gun Salisbury-class fourth rate
- Tons burthen: 1,044 11/94 (bm)
- Length: 146 ft (44.5 m) (overall); 120 ft 2 in (36.6 m) (keel)
- Beam: 40 ft 5 in (12.3 m)
- Depth of hold: 17 ft 3 1/2 in (5.27 m)
- Propulsion: Sails
- Sail plan: Full-rigged ship
- Complement: 350
- Armament: Upper deck: 22 × 12-pounder guns; Lower deck: 22 × 24-pounder guns; QD: 4 × 6-pounder guns; Fc: 2 × 6-pounder guns

HMS Centurion was a 50-gun Salisbury-class fourth-rate ship of the line of the Royal Navy. She served in the American War of Independence and French Revolutionary and Napoleonic Wars. During the war with America, Centurion saw action in a number of engagements and supported British forces in the Caribbean and the North American coasts. Spending the period of peace either serving as a flagship in the Caribbean or laid up or under refit in British dockyards, she was recommissioned in time to see action in the wars with France, particularly in the East Indies.

Her most important action came in the Battle of Visakhapatnam in 1804, in which she fought against a French squadron of Counter-admiral Charles-Alexandre Léon Durand Linois that consisted of a 74-gun ship, and two frigates. Despite sustaining severe damage, she continued fighting, and survived the assault by the considerably heavier forces. Returning to Britain shortly afterwards, she was refitted and transferred to Halifax, where she served as a hospital and receiving ship for the rest of her career. She sank at her moorings there in 1824, and was raised the following year and broken up, ending 50 years of Royal Navy service.

== Construction ==
Centurion was ordered on 25 December 1770 and laid down in May 1771 at the yards of Barnard & Turner, of Harwich. She was launched on 22 May 1774 and had been completed by 9 September 1775. She cost a total of £20,537.17.9d, including masts and rigging, with a further £4,205.16.10d spent on fitting her out for sea. Centurion was commissioned in July 1775 under her first commander, Captain Richard Braithwaite.

== American War of Independence ==
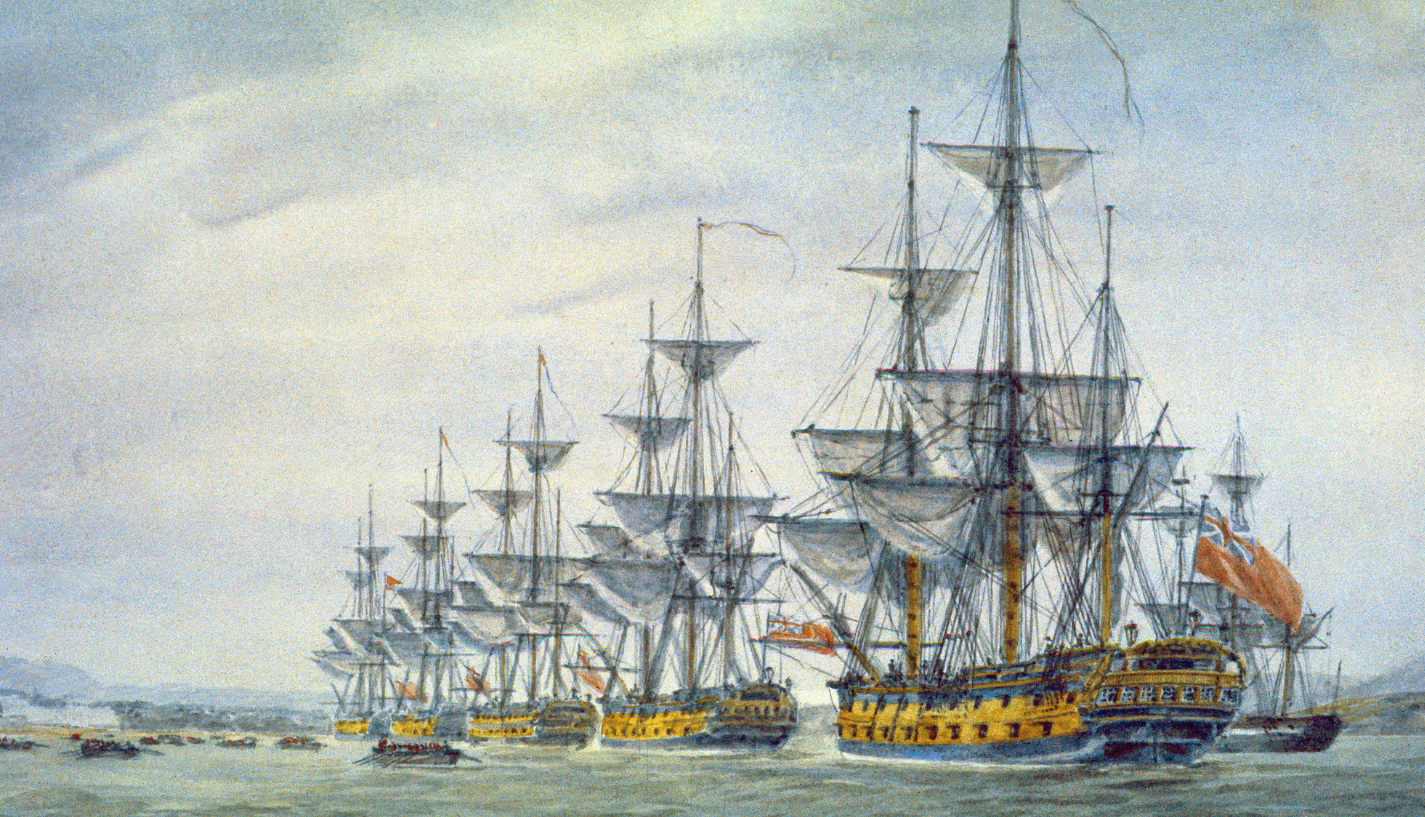
The British capture of Newport, Rhode Island on 8 December 1776, which Centurion took part in

Under Captain Braithwaite, Centurion sailed to the North America station in late 1775, arriving at Boston 18 December after a twelve week journey during which most of her sails were lost. HMS Centurion served during the occupation of Rhode Island harbour in December of the following year. Centurion was part of Richard Howe's fleet at its encounter with the comte d'Estaing on 11 August 1778, after which she briefly became Howe's flagship between 14 and 15 August. By November, she was in the West Indies with William Hotham's forces, where she supported the landings on St. Lucia on 14 and 15 December. Remaining in the Leeward Islands throughout 1779, Centurion took part in the Battle of Martinique on 17 April 1780, followed by periods of action in the indecisive clashes that took place on 15 and 19 May. Centurion, then returned to Britain and was paid off in September 1780.

After a period spent being repaired and refitted at Portsmouth, she returned to North America in July 1781 under the command of Captain Samuel Clayton. On 22 January 1783, she came upon a battle between the frigate HMS Hussar and the 36-gun French frigate Sibylle off the Chesapeake, prompting Sybille's surrender. At the end of the American War of Independence Centurion returned home, where she was paid off in October 1783 and fitted to be laid up in ordinary at Sheerness.

== Inter-war period ==
After a year spent laid up, Centurion began a Great Repair at Woolwich in December 1784, which was completed in December 1787. She returned to active service in February 1789, as the flagship of Rear-Admiral Philip Affleck, with William Otway as her captain. Otway sailed her to Jamaica in May 1789, returning to Britain in August 1792, where she underwent another repair and refit, this time at Chatham. She was recommissioned during this work, in November 1792, under Captain Samuel Osborn. With the dockyard completed by January 1793 she sailed to the Leeward Islands in February.

== French Revolutionary and Napoleonic Wars ==
After some time spent on the Leeward islands, Centurion sailed to the East Indies in November 1793 and was present at the action of 5 May 1794. On 22 October the following year, she and HMS Diomede fought an action with the 44-gun French frigates Prudente and Cybèle, plus the 22-gun Jean-Bart and 14-gun Coureur off Mauritius. She went on to take part in the capture of Ceylon in July and August 1795, and of Amboyna and Baada in February 1796.

Captain John Spratt Rainier took command in April 1797, remaining initially in the East Indies, but shifting to the Red Sea in 1799 and 1800. The British had received information that the French had transferred warship frames to Suez to build some warships for the Red Sea. Centurion sailed to Mokha, where she met up with Albatross and sailed with her to Suez. (Note: These may have been the first British warships ever to sail in the Red Sea.) During 1799 William Hugh Dobbie, first lieutenant of Centurion, surveyed the Jeddah and Crossire (also spelled "Cossir" and "Kossir") roads, the harbour at the Jaffatine islands, and several other anchorages. His efforts would prove of use to a later British expedition under Sir David Baird and Rear-Admiral Blanket.

Centurion returned to Batavia in August 1800, and on 23 August she, with Sybille, Daedalus, and Braave, captured or destroyed several Dutch vessels at Batavia Roads. One vessel, a Dutch brig, the Royal Navy took into service as Admiral Rainier.

=== Battle of Visakhapatnam ===
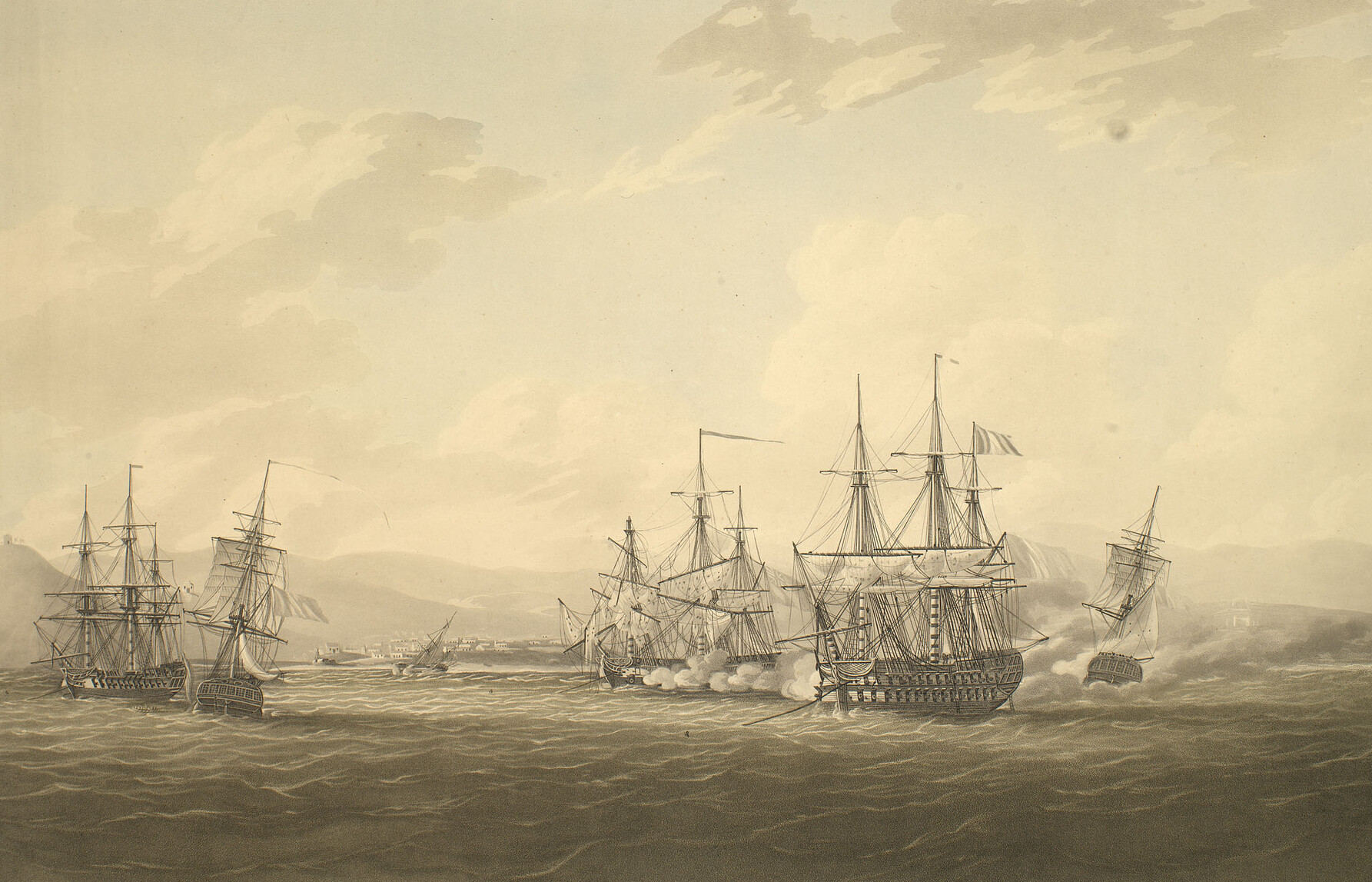
Centurion (centre) at the Battle of Visakhapatnam

By September 1804, Admiral Peter Rainier, the commander of the fleet Centurion was attached to, had become concerned about the presence of a French squadron in the area under Counter-admiral Charles-Alexandre Léon Durand Linois which was raiding British shipping. He therefore substituted the small frigate HMS Wilhelmina with the Centurion as a convoy escort for a small convoy of two East Indiamen, the Barnaby and the Princess Charlotte. The convoy was anchored at Visakhapatnam early on 18 September when Linois's squadron approached the harbour. The Centurion's acting commander, James Lind was ashore, leaving Lieutenant James Robert Phillips in command. Phillips sighted the approaching ships and, suspecting them to be French, opened fire. Linois continued to approach, causing one of the East Indiamen to run ashore, where she was wrecked, while Lind hurried to return to his ship.

The three main French ships, the 74-gun Marengo and the frigates Sémillante and Atalante, continued to approach under fire from Centurion and the shore batteries protecting the harbour. When the French frigates came within 200 yards (180 m), Phillips opened fire on Atalante as Sémillante attempted to reach the other side of the British ship and surround her. Linois did not want to risk the Marengo when there might be uncharted shoals about, and so he fired from a longer range. After several hours of fighting Centurion had suffered severe damage. She had been severely holed, with her rigging wrecked and her anchor cable shot through, which caused her to slowly drift away from the shore, out of control. The French took the opportunity to capture the remaining East Indiaman and withdraw from the harbour. The Centurion lost one man killed and nine wounded. The French suffered slightly heavier losses, Marengo losing two men killed and an officer wounded and Atalante three killed and five wounded. Sémillante, which had not been closely engaged in the battle, suffered no casualties. Damage to the French ships was severe, and Linois was forced to abandon further operations.

Both nations claimed the encounter as a victory, the French for the capture of the East Indiaman and the British for the survival of Centurion in the face of overwhelming French numerical superiority.

== Retirement from active service ==
Centurion did not remain much longer in the East Indies, being sent home in November as needing an extensive repairs, due at least in part to the damage inflicted by an infestation of white ants. The letter sent back with her from the commanding officer of her station declared that he was sending her home as she "will require an expensive repair if detained any longer in this Country; in her present state she may be converted by the Navy Board to some useful inferior establishment, as I know of no other mean of effectively getting rid of the White Ants onboard her, who have at times discovered themselves by serious depredations aloft".

Centurion was duly fitted at Chatham for service as a hospital ship, and sailed to Halifax in 1808 under the command of Lieutenant Edward Webb. She became a receiving ship and stores depot there under Captain George Monke, followed by a return to being a hospital ship in 1809. She was back in use as a receiving ship under Captain William Skipsey in June 1813, during which time she served as flagship of Rear-Admiral Edward Griffith. Captain Justice Finley took over command in June 1814, followed by Captain David Scott from October 1814.

== Fate ==
Centurion was finally hulked in 1817, in which state she spent the next seven years. She sank at her moorings on 21 February 1824; was raised and broken up in 1825.
