= Pigot (1780 Indiaman) =

History

East India Company
- Name: Pigot
- Namesake: Lord George Pigot (probably)
- Owner: Voyages 1&2:Charles Foulis; Voyages 3-5:Robert Preston
- Builder: Perry, Blackwall
- Launched: 1780
- Fate: Captured 1794

General characteristics
- Type: East Indiaman
- Tons burthen: 765, or 76221/94 (bm)
- Length: Overall: 137 ft 2 in (41.8 m); Keel: 109 ft 5 3/4 in (33.4 m)
- Beam: 36 ft 3 in (11.0 m)
- Depth of hold: 15 ft 0 in (4.6 m)
- Complement: 99; 102 at capture
- Armament: 26 × 9 & 4-pounder guns; 30 or 32 × 9-pounders at capture

Pigot was an East Indiaman that made five voyages to India, China, and the East Indies for the British East India Company (EIC) between 1780 and 1794. Oh her fifth voyage, which occurred early in the French Revolutionary Wars, the French captured her during the Sunda Strait campaign of 1794.

== Career ==
=== Voyage #1 (1780-1782) ===
Captain Robert Morgan left Portsmouth on 3 June 1780, bound for China and Benkulen. Pigot reached Whampoa on 2 February 1781. For her return voyage she crossed the Second Bar, about 20 miles before Whampoa, on 8 April, and was at Macao on 23 April. She reached Benkulen, where the EIC had a factory, on 1 August and Padang on 19 August, and returned to Benkulen on 25 September. She then reached St Helena on 17 December, and Plymouth on 10 March 1782. She arrived at the Downs on 31 March.

=== Voyage #2 (1783-85) ===
Morgan left Portsmouth on 11 March 1783, bound for Madras and Bengal. Pigot reached São Tiago on 31 March and Johanna on 17 July.

On 24 August Duke of Kingston caught fire off Ceylon and was destroyed. Duke of Kingston was in company with Pigot, Earl of Oxford, and Vansittart, all of which were safe. Some 65 passengers, crew, troops, and their dependents died.

Pigot reached Madras on 26 August. She arrived at Kedgeree on 10 October. Homeward bound, she passed Saugor on 15 February 1784 and reached Vizagapatam on 14 March. She stopped in again at Madras on 3 April, went to Coringa on 5 June, returned to Madras on 2 October, reached Coringa again on 25 November, was at Masulipatam on 5 January 1785, and was again at Madras on 10 January.

On 2 May she was at the Kromme River, where Morgan took the latitude and longitude as 34°09′S 26°03′E, with the longitude being 7° 38' east of Cape Town. The correct figures for the river's mouth are 34°09′S 24°51′E, indicating the ongoing difficulty of calculating longitude.

Pigot reached False Bay on 8 June and St Helena on 19 July. She arrived at the Downs on 9 October.

=== Voyage #3 (1786-87) ===
George Ballantyne (or Ballantine), was Pigot's captain for this and the next two voyages. He left the Downs on 26 March 1786, bound for China. Pigot reached Whampoa on 11 September. Homeward bound, she crossed the Second Bar on 5 January 1787, reached North Island - the northmost of three islands in the bay that formed the principle anchorage of Enggano Island - on 2 March, and St Helena on 2 June. She arrived back at the Downs on 12 August.

=== Voyage #4 (1789-1790) ===
Ballantyne left the Downs on 6 March 1789, bound for Madras and Bengal. Pigot reached Madras on 28 June and arrived at Diamond Harbour on 8 July. Homeward bound, she passed Saugor on 23 December, reached Madras on 2 February 1790, and St Helena on 29 August. She arrived back at the Downs on 29 June.

=== Voyage #5 (1793 and loss) ===
Ballantyne left Portsmouth on 22 May 1793, bound for Bengal and Benkulen. War with France had broken out almost four months earlier, so as became the common practice for EIC vessels, he received a letter of marque on 17 April. This authorized him to engage in offensive action against the French, not just defensive. Pigot was part of a convoy that included the East Indiamen Prince William, Lord Thurlow, William Pitt, Glatton, Barwell, Earl of Oxford, Ostereley, Fort William, London, Houghton, Marquis of Landsdown, Hillsborough, Ceres, and Earl of Abergavenny, amongst numerous other vessels, merchant and military, most of the non-Indiamen travelling to the Mediterranean.

On 24 June, Pigot captured the French brig La France, which was sailing from "the Mauritius" to France. The account in the London Gazette refers to the brig as Le Franc. From the number of vessels named in separate accounts as sharing in the prize money, it is clear that the fleet shared the capture. Ceres took possession.

Pigot reached Diamond Harbour on 14 September.

== Capture ==
The withdrawal of the Royal Navy squadron from Indian waters had left the EIC's trade vulnerable to privateers from Île de France (Mauritius). The EIC therefore decided to equip a squadron of its merchantmen as cruisers to protect its trade.

The squadron consisted of the East Indiamen William Pitt, Houghton, Nonsuch, and the Bombay Marine (EIC) 14-gun brig Nautilus, all under the overall command of Commodore Charles Mitchell of William Pitt. Contemporary accounts of the composition of squadron vary widely. One account lists the vessels as Britannia, Pigot, Houghton, Nonsuch, and the cruiser Viper. It states their task would be to cruise the Malacca and Sunda Straits, and the Bay of Bengal, when not actually convoying the trade. Lloyd's List lists the squadron as consisting of William Pitt, Oxford, Houghton, Nonsuch, Britannia, and the "Nancy Grab". (Note: A grab was a two- or three-masted vessel used on the Malabar Coast.) They were armed and believed to be cruising the Straits. Pigot was to accompany them to Benkulen.

Pigot passed Saugor on 27 November, and reached Penang on 21 December. She left Penang three days later with a large supply of military stores for Bencoolen. She arrived at Benkulen on 12 January 1794.

In the meantime, the EIC squadron under Commodore Charles Mitchell passed Singapore on 2 January 1794, sailing eastwards in search of French raiders. As the British squadron travelled along the northern coast of Sumatra, two French privateers attacked Bencoolen on the southern coast. The privateers were the 30-gun Vengeur and the 26-gun Résolu. On 17 January they approached the mouth of Rat Island Basin close to Bencoolen where Pigot lay at anchor, completely unprepared for action. At 08:15 Vengeur opened fire at 150 yards (137 m), maintaining the battle for an hour and 45 minutes before hauling off so that Résolu could continue the combat. Ballantyne defended his vessel intelligently, positioning Pigot so that the French could only approach one at a time through the narrow mouth of the bay. This allowed him to drive off each ship in turn, the privateers falling back together at 10:20 with damaged rigging. Pigot too had suffered, with one man mortally wounded and sufficient damage to the rigging to require several weeks of repairs. After immediate repairs had been completed, next day Corosin abandoned Bencoolen and retreated to the Sunda Strait in search of weaker targets. The governor at Bencoolen sent over reinforcements to Pigot in the form of a lieutenant, 40 sepoys, and two 18-pounder guns. They arrived too late to assist, and Ballantayne sent them to Rat Island to establish a battery as he could not use the guns.

Early on 22 January, Mitchell's squadron stopped a merchant ship for inspection and as the ship was searched two new sails appeared to the southwest near Shown Rock in the Zuften Islands. Suspicious of the identity of the new arrivals, Mitchell sent Britannia and Nonsuch in pursuit and the ships turned away. As the East Indiamen closed with the fleeing ships, they were identified as Vengeur and Résolu. The British vessels soon outran the French and the French opened fire to which the larger British vessels responded. Captain Thomas Cheap of Britannia engaged Vengeur while Captain John Canning of Nonsuch attacked Résolu at 10:45 and were soon supported by William Pitt and Houghton. The overwhelming numbers and size of the British squadron soon convinced Corosin and Jallineaux that further resistance was pointless and 45 minutes after the first shots were fired both surrendered.

On 25 January in the Sunda strait, Mitchell engaged a French naval squadron under the overall command of Captain Jean-Marie Renaud. The squadron had sailed from the Île de France and consisted of the frigates Prudente and Cybèle, the brig Vulcain, and the captured Princess Royal, now renamed Duguay-Trouin. The combat was inconclusive and both sides withdrew, Mitchell to Batavia.

The French squadron under Renaud withdrew into the Indian Ocean via Bencoolen, which they reached on 6 February. Pigot was still there, undergoing repairs in the Rat Island basin. The attack did not take place until the next day. Although Ballantyne resisted for half-an-hour, he was so outnumbered and outgunned that at 4pm he was forced to strike. As the French maneuvered Pigot out of the bay, Renaud demanded that the small Fort Marlborough nearby surrender. Actually, Renaud demanded 300,000 dollars as a ransom in lieu of surrender. Captain Thomas Brown, commander of the garrison of 20 Europeans and 300 sepoys, declined. He, his two officers, and the garrison showed such energy in preparing the defenses, heating shot, etc., that Renaud withdrew. (Note: Brown was actually a lieutenant, with captain being a local rank. He rose to become Lieutenant-General Sir Thomas Brown, KCB.) The French then returned to Île de France.

Lloyd's List reported, "The Pigot (Ballantine), of London; the Sacramento, a Portuguese Ship; and the Ceres, ---- -----, the latter from Manilla to Bengal, have been taken by the French and carried into the Mauritius." The EIC reported that there was no cargo aboard.

== Post-script ==
On 1 June a snow from Mauritius arrived at the Danish exclave of Tranquebar. She brought the news that Pigot had arrived at Mauritius on 14 March. Ballantayne, his first officer, two midshipmen, and four crew were aboard her. Her captors had divided up the rest of the crew over the vessels of their squadron. The French permitted Ballantyne to return to England on his own parole. Ballantyne left in an American ship for New York.

The rest of the officers and crew, who reported that the French had treated them well, were waiting for a cartel that would take them to Madras. At the end of March, the Danish ship Minerva, Coulthard, master, was to take 50 British prisoners at the end of March. The Times reported that "the remainder of the crew of the Pigot with some Dutchmen taken in a packet from Batavia were in a cartel Ship bound to Madras but which was prevented from sailing by the people on shore who suspecting the Captain was an Aristocrat unhung her rudder and carried him on shore for trial." As it was, the prisoners were freed at Bombay in August.
