= Sunda Strait campaign of January 1794 =

1794 campaign of the East Indies theatre of the French Revolutionary Wars

- Part of the East Indies theatre of the French Revolutionary Wars
- 1803 map of the Sunda Strait
Date	2 January – 9 February 1794
Location	Sunda Strait
Result	Inconclusive

Belligerents
East India Company; Dutch Republic	France

Commanders and leaders
Charles Mitchell; Kerwal	Jean-Marie Renaud

Strength
6 merchant ships 2 corvettes 1 brig	4 frigates 1 corvette 1 brig

Casualties and losses
3 killed 2 wounded 1 merchant ship captured	11 killed 25 wounded 1 frigate captured 1 corvette captured

The Sunda Strait campaign of January 1794 was a series of manoeuvres and naval actions fought between warships and privateers of the French Republic and a squadron of vessels sent by the British East India Company to protect trade in the region, later augmented by Dutch warships. The campaign developed as French forces based on Isle de France reacted more quickly than the British forces in the Indian Ocean to the expansion of the French Revolutionary Wars on 1 February 1793. French privateers rapidly spread along the British trade routes in the Far East, becoming concentrated around the narrow Sunda Strait between the islands of Java and Sumatra in the Dutch East Indies. These ships were soon joined by French Navy frigates and began to inflict losses on shipping in the region. The Royal Navy forces in the Indian Ocean were deployed elsewhere and so the East India Company, the private enterprise that ruled much of British India in the 1790s and maintained their own fleet and navy, raised a squadron of armed merchant ships to patrol the Strait and drive off the raiders.

The arrival of this British force on 2 January 1794 was initially a success, the squadron over-running and capturing two large and well-armed privateers on 22 January, not long after the French vessels had been beaten off during an attack on the British trading post at Bencoolen. On 24 January an action against a larger French squadron was fought in the Strait itself, but ended inconclusively and the squadrons divided, the British receiving the Dutch frigate Amazone as reinforcement. The French subsequently turned southwards out of the Strait and attacked Bencoolen again on 9 February, capturing an East Indiaman in the harbour before returning to Isle de France with their prize.

== Background ==
On 1 February 1793, the French Republic declared war on Great Britain and the Dutch Republic, extending the already existing French Revolutionary Wars. It took several months for news of the outbreak of war to reach British India, messages arriving at Calcutta from Consul George Baldwin at Alexandria on 11 June. The Royal Navy commander in the region, Commodore William Cornwallis, immediately set about demanding the surrender of the French trading posts in India. Most fell within a few days, but the major port of Pondicherry refused, and was besieged from 1 August. The siege lasted a month before the French commander capitulated under bombardment from British land and naval forces. With the French presence eliminated from India, Cornwallis was ordered to return to Europe, leaving minimal naval forces in the Indian Ocean.

The Indian Ocean formed a vital part of Britain's trade links with the wider British Empire. India was controlled by the East India Company, a commercial organisation that maintained its own army and navy in Indian waters and owned a fleet of large merchant ships known as East Indiamen. These vessels ranged in size between 400 and 1500 tons burthen (bm), carried up to 30 cannons and were capable in certain conditions of fighting warships, although a frigate was usually more than a match for an individual East Indiaman. These ships sailed on an annual route from China, the East Indies or India carrying trade goods such as spices, tea or silk to Britain. There the goods were sold, and replaced with general cargo including military equipment and troops for the journey back to the Indian Ocean.

One of the most vital parts of the Indian trade route was through the Sunda Strait between the islands of Sumatra and Java in the Dutch East Indies, through which most of the China and East Indies trade passed on its journey to the Indian Ocean. French ships, both Navy warships and commercially owned privateers, operated along the Indian trade routes from their base at the isolated French colony of Isle de France and recognised the strategic importance of the Sunda Straits. As soon as news of war arrived at Isle de France French ships spread out into the Indian Ocean in search of British and Dutch merchant shipping, gathering in significant numbers off the Sunda Straits.

On 27 September 1793 French cruisers achieved their first major victory when three privateers mounting more than 20 guns each attacked the East Indiaman Princess Royal, under Captain James Horncastle, off Anjier (or Anjere or Anger) Point in the Sunda Strait. Although Horncastle resisted, the privateers outgunned him and eventually forced him to strike.

With the Royal Navy unable to provide forces to protect trade in the East Indies, the East India Company authorities in India decided to form a squadron from their own ships to patrol the region. Two East Indiamen, William Pitt and Britannia, and the country ship Nonsuch, were diverted from their regular route for the service, accompanied by the brig Nautilus (or possibly Viper), and under the overall command of Commodore Charles Mitchell, captain of William Pitt.

== Campaign ==
On 2 January 1794 this force passed Singapore and entered the Malacca Strait, sailing eastwards in search of French raiders. As the British squadron travelled along the northern coast of Sumatra, two French privateers attacked the East India Company's trading post at Bencoolen on the southern coast. The privateers were the 30-gun Vengeur under Captain François-Yves Carosin and the 26-gun Résolue under Captain Jallineaux, and on 17 January they approached the mouth of Rat Island Basin close to Bencoolen where the 32-gun East Indiaman Pigot lay at anchor. Pigot, under Captain George Ballantyne, had a crew of 102 men, but was completely unprepared for action. At 08:15 Vengeur opened fire at 150 yards (137 m), maintaining the battle for an hour and 45 minutes before hauling off so that Résolu could continue the combat. Ballantyne defended his vessel intelligently, positioning Pigot so that the French could only approach one at a time through the narrow mouth of the bay. This allowed him to drive off each ship in turn, the privateers falling back together at 10:20 with damaged rigging. Pigot too had suffered, with one man killed and sufficient damage to the rigging to require several weeks of repairs. After immediate repairs had been completed, Captain François-Yves Carosin abandoned Bencoolen and retreated to the Sunda Strait in search of weaker targets.

Early on 22 January, Mitchell's squadron, reinforced by the East Indiaman Houghton, stopped a merchant ship for inspection and as the ship was searched two new sails appeared to the southwest near Shown Rock in the Zuften Islands. Suspicious of the identity of the new arrivals, Mitchell sent Britannia and Nonsuch in pursuit and the ships turned away. As the East Indiamen closed with the fleeing ships, they were identified as Vengeur and Résolu. The British vessels soon outran the French and the French opened fire to which the larger British vessels responded. Captain Thomas Cheap of Britannia engaged Vengeur while Captain John Canning of Nonsuch attacked Résolu at 10:45 and were soon supported by William Pitt and Houghton. The overwhelming numbers and size of the British squadron soon convinced Corosin and Jallineaux that further resistance was pointless and 45 minutes after the first shots were fired both surrendered. Captain François-Yves Carosin died in the aftermath of the battle after losing a leg and another 11 French sailors were killed and 25 wounded, while British losses were one killed and two wounded on Britannia. French records report that Résolu has sustained heavy casualties. The British then manned both raiders with crews from the East Indiaman squadron.

=== Battle of the Sunda Strait ===
On the morning of 24 January, most of Mitchell's squadron lay at anchor off the island of Pulau Panjang in Bantam Bay on the northwestern tip of Java, with Nonsuch and the new prizes remaining in the Zuften Islands about 15 miles (24 km) distant. At 06:00, sails were sighted in the northern part of the Sunda Strait passing the small island of Dwars in de Weg that were rapidly identified as three frigates and a brig. These were in fact the French naval squadron from Isle de France, consisting of the frigates Prudente and Cybèle, the brig Vulcain and the captured Princess Royal, now renamed Duguay-Trouin, under the overall command of Captain Jean-Marie Renaud. Canning attempted to communicate with the strange vessels, but by 13:00 it was obvious from their lack of response that these were enemy ships, and the greatly outnumbered Canning made all sail northeast with his prizes to avoid destruction.

During the evening heavy rain squalls reduced visibility and prevented any decisive movement by either side, but on 25 January the French squadron had rounded St. Nicholas Point at the northwestern tip of Java and was in full pursuit of Canning's ships, which had been joined by Houghton. Resolu in particular was struggling to escape the advancing enemy, but Mitchell had realised the danger and was sailing to intercept the French. At 06:30 Houghton, Nonsuch and Vengeur joined with the remainder of Mitchell's force and two hours later Renaud's ships met the British line, Resolu just managing to reach safety in the shelter of the large East Indiamen despite being hit repeatedly in the latter stages of the chase. For an hour the two squadrons continued a general exchange of fire at long-range, before Mitchell turned William Pitt, Houghton and Nonsuch towards the French at 09:30, the latter two both managing to hit Cybèle with destructive broadsides. Firing continued for another 18 minutes as Renaud withdrew, eventually anchoring off the island of Pulau Baby. Neither commander was keen to continue the action, Mitchell fearing that his undermanned ships would not be able to properly engage the better armed French vessels. Casualties among the French squadron are not known, but the only loss on the British ships was on Nonsuch, which had a man killed in combat with Cybèle.

=== Final operations ===
In need of reinforcement and resupply, Mitchell led his squadron to Batavia, Dutch East Indies. There, the squadron was joined by the 36-gun Dutch States Navy frigate Amazone under Captain Kerwal and an East Indiaman of the Dutch East India Company. Mitchell's ships then cruised the Sunda Strait for another two weeks without discovering any French vessels, before concluding the operation on 8 February and returning to the Indian Ocean via Bencoolen. Cheap died of an illness in June, but Mitchell survived and on his return to Britain in 1796 was knighted by King George III, and presented with £8,000 (the equivalent of £920,000 as of 2025) as reward and compensation for his diversion to the Straits.

The Dutch meanwhile retained their warships for a raid on Surabaya where two French corvettes were sheltering. Both were captured without a fight and sent back to France as cartels carrying French prisoners. Alternatively, Royal Charlotte reported in August 1794 on her return to England that the Dutch at Batavia had purchased the French prizes Vengeur and Resolve and would send them in July to Mauritius as cartels with the French prisoners.

The French squadron under Renaud had used the retreat of Mitchell's force to also withdraw into the Indian Ocean via Bencoolen, reaching the British trading post on 9 February. There Pigot was still undergoing repairs and was taken by surprise and captured. As the merchant ship was manoeuvred out of the bay, Renaud demanded the surrender of the small Fort Marlborough nearby and was informed that the fort was well armed and that the arrival of Mitchell's squadron was expected at any moment. Unwilling to continue the engagement with Mitchell, Renaud withdrew immediately without assaulting the fort.

== Aftermath ==
The French squadron subsequently returned to Isle de France where, in the action of 22 October 1794, they drew away two British warships that blockaded the island.

The Sunda Strait and surrounding waters remained an important strategic location throughout the war, although the subsequent organisation of East Indiamen into convoys and the return of a Royal Navy presence in the region assisted in limiting losses to French privateers and smaller warships. On more than one occasion convoys of East Indiamen successfully discouraged large squadrons from attempting attacks on the valuable merchant craft with their size and power.

== Orders of battle ==
=== East India Company ===
Ship	Type	Commander	Notes
Commodore Mitchell's squadron
William Pitt	East Indiaman	Commodore Charles Mitchell	Flagship of the squadron. Engaged on 25 January
Britannia	East Indiaman	Captain Thomas Cheap	Engaged on 22 and 25 January, one man killed
Nonsuch	East Indiaman	Captain John Canning	Engaged on 22 and 25 January, one man killed
Houghton	East Indiaman	Captain Hudson	Engaged on 25 January
Nautilus	Brig	Captain Roper	
Vengeur	Corvette		Captured on 22 January, engaged on 25 January
Resolu	Corvette		Captured on 22 January, engaged on 25 January
Independent ship
Pigot	East Indiaman	Captain George Ballantyne	Engaged on 17 January, captured on 9 February
Source: James, Vol. 1, pp. 196–197

=== French Navy and privateers ===
Ship	Type	Commander	Notes
Captain Corosin's squadron
Vengeur	30 gun privateer frigate	Captain Corosin †	Engaged on 17 January, captured on 22 January
Résolu	26 gun privateer corvette	Captain Jallineaux	Engaged on 17 January, captured on 22 January
Captain Renaud's squadron
Prudente	36 gun frigate	Captain Jean-Marie Renaud	Engaged on 25 January and 9 February
Cybèle	40 gun frigate		Engaged on 25 January and 9 February
Vulcain	14 gun Brig		Engaged on 25 January and 9 February
Duguay Trouin	30 gun frigate		Former East Indiaman. Engaged on 25 January and 9 February
Source: James, Vol. 1, pp. 197–198
