= French brig Duc de Chartres =

French brig Duc de Chartres is the name of the following ships:

- French brig Duc de Chartres (1780 Le Havre)
- French brig Duc de Chartres (1780 Saint-Malo)

== See also ==
- List of counts and dukes of Chartres
