= John Spratt Rainier =

English naval officer and politician (1777–1822)

Rear-Admiral John Spratt Rainier
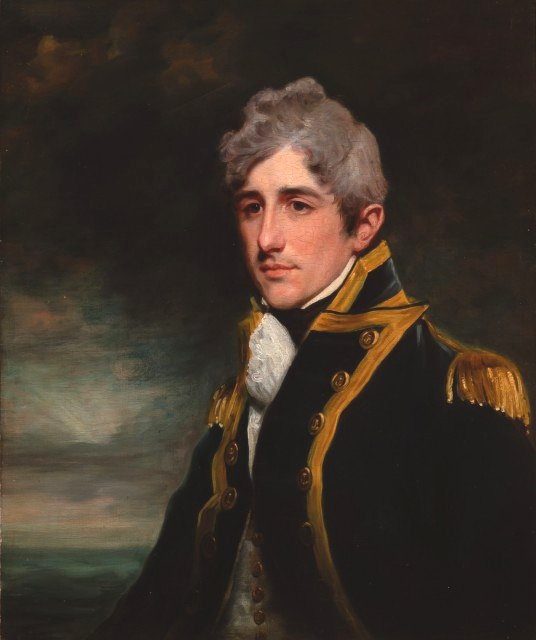
- Rainier in captain's uniform, c. 1796

Member of Parliament for Sandwich
- In office April 1808 – September 1812

Personal details
- Born: 1777 Sandwich, Kent
- Died: 13 November 1822 (aged 44) Portsmouth, Hampshire
- Resting place: St Mary's Church, Sandwich
- Spouse: Elizabeth Deare (1780–1872) (m. 1806)
- Relations: Admiral Peter Rainier (uncle); Captain Peter Rainier (cousin)

Military service
- Allegiance: Great Britain; United Kingdom
- Branch/service: Royal Navy
- Rank: Rear-Admiral of the Blue
- Commands: HMS Swift; HMS Vindictive; HMS Dordrecht; HMS Centurion; HMS Norge
- Battles/wars: French Revolutionary Wars; East Indies theatre; French campaign in Egypt

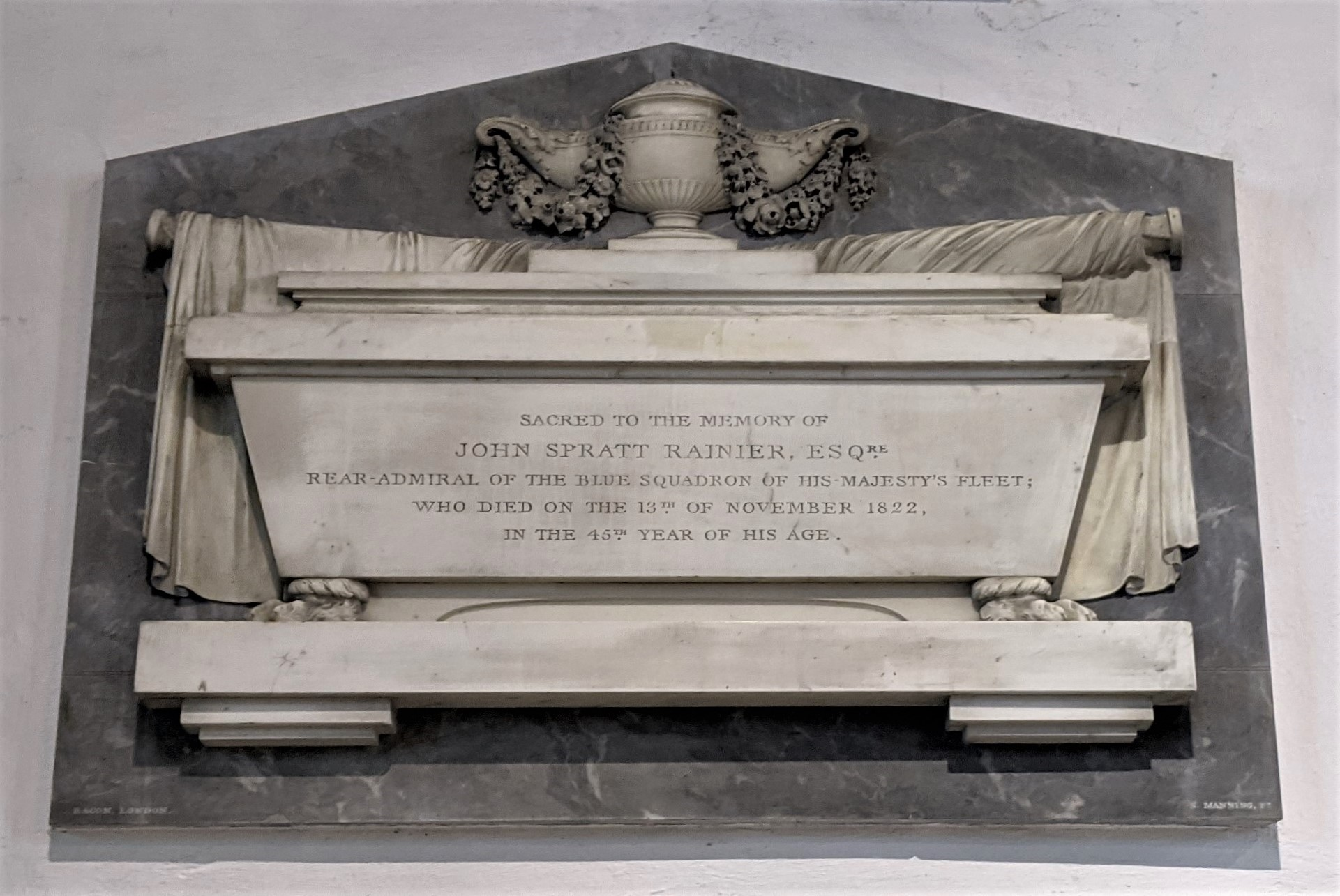
Rainier's memorial in St Mary's Church, Sandwich, Kent

John Spratt Rainier (sometimes spelt Sprat; 1777 – 13 November 1822) was an officer in the Royal Navy. He was appointed to the rank of post captain at the age of 19 while serving in the French Revolutionary Wars and went on to command ships of the line in the Napoleonic Wars. Rainier served as Member of Parliament for Sandwich from 1808 to 1812 and was promoted to rear-admiral in 1819.

== Life ==
John Spratt Rainier was born in Sandwich, Kent in 1777, the second son of Daniel Rainier, a wine merchant who had served as mayor of Sandwich, and his wife Margaret, née Heath. His family were of Huguenot origin.

=== Naval career ===
His family had strong naval connections, and a number of John Rainier's relatives, including his uncle, Admiral Peter Rainier, and later his cousin, Captain Peter Rainier, had distinguished naval careers.

After joining the Royal Navy and serving as a midshipman, John Rainier was promoted lieutenant in May 1794 and was posted to HMS Suffolk in 1795. This was the East Indies Station flagship of his uncle, Peter Rainier, whose patronage ensured his nephew's rapid promotion. By February 1796 John Rainier had been promoted locally to the rank of commander, with command of the 16-gun sloop HMS Swift. He was with this vessel at the seizure of the islands of Ambon and Banda Neira, in the Dutch East Indies, which met with little resistance. In December 1796, aged 19 and still with his uncle's East Indies squadron, he was promoted to post-captain. In this rank he first commanded the 26-gun HMS Vindictive, formerly the Bellona, and then the 64-gun HMS Dordrecht. (Note: Both ships had been previously captured from the Dutch in August 1796 at the capitulation of Saldanha Bay, in the Dutch Cape Colony.)

In April 1797 Rainier took command of HMS Centurion, a 50-gun ship of the line, initially remaining in the East Indies, but based in the Red Sea in 1799–1800. This was after the British had received information that the French, as part of Napoleon's Egyptian campaign, had transferred ship frames to Suez to build warships for the Red Sea. HMS Centurion returned to Batavia in August 1800, where Rainier was part of the British fleet that entered Batavia Roads and captured five Dutch armed vessels and destroyed 22 others. Seizure of enemy ships and their cargos led to the award of prize money to the victorious crews. Rainier was a beneficiary of this system, including when in October 1801 the Centurion captured the ships Anna Margaretta and Holstein. In September 1804, Rainier was ill ashore when the Centurion took part in Battle of Vizagapatam, off the Indian coast. In November that year the ship returned home for repairs and was decommissioned. Rainier's last command was the 74-gun HMS Norge in 1810–11, spending much of his remaining service on half-pay. He was promoted Rear-Admiral of the Blue in August 1819.

The National Maritime Museum in London holds Rainier's Admiral's cocked hat and his log books for the period 10 October 1796 – 14 February 1797 while he commanded HMS Swift.

=== Parliament ===
At the 1807 general election Admiral Peter Rainier, recently retired from the navy, was elected as one of Sandwich's two Members of Parliament. His death the following year led to a contested by-election in April 1808. His nephew John Rainier was returned in his place, having secured the support of the then Tory administration. After the election, the losing candidate, Major Charles Morgan, petitioned unsuccessfully against Rainier's return, alleging bribery, treating, corruption and improper use of a letter of support from a cabinet minister.

Still a serving naval officer when elected, in January 1809 Rainier applied to the Admiralty for a month's leave when his ship was ordered for service abroad, he being 'very desirous to remain on shore in attendance on the House of Commons'. Although he never made a formal speech in Parliament, Rainier's voting record confirms he often attended the House of Commons, and while he mainly supported the government, he did sometimes vote with the opposition. He did not seek re-election at the October 1812 general election.

=== Personal life ===
Rainier was married on 12 March 1806 to Elizabeth Deare, with their only child, a daughter named Eliza Spratt Rainier, born in 1809. In 1808 Rainier inherited a considerable sum from his uncle, Admiral Rainier, who had acquired a fortune while in naval service, mainly from prize money, the bulk of which passed to his two nephews. This made John Rainier a wealthy man by the standards of the time, especially when added to the prize money he had himself received during his naval service.

In January 1818 Rainier, being described as 'well versed in various branches of natural knowledge', was elected as a fellow of the Royal Society.

John Rainier died in Portsmouth on 13 November 1822 aged 44 and was buried at Sandwich. There are memorials to both John Spratt Rainier and his uncle Admiral Peter Rainier in St Mary's Church, Sandwich.

Parliament of the United Kingdom
Preceded by Peter Rainier; Hon. Charles Jenkinson	Member of Parliament for Sandwich; 1808–1812; With: Hon. Charles Jenkinson	Succeeded by Joseph Maryatt; Sir Joseph Sydney Yorke
