= Vansittart (1780 EIC ship) =

History

Great Britain
- Name: Vansittart
- Namesake: Peter van Sittart, father of Henry Vansittart
- Owner: Richard Lewin,
- Operator: British East India Company
- Builder: Wells, Rotherhithe
- Launched: 20 March 1780
- Fate: Wrecked 1789

General characteristics
- Tons burthen: 758, or 828, or 829, or 82939/94 (bm)
- Length: Overall:146 ft 1 1/2 in (44.5 m); Keel:118 ft 6 1/4 in (36.1 m)
- Beam: 36 ft 3 in (11.0 m)
- Depth of hold: 14 ft 10 in (4.5 m)
- Notes: Three decks

Vansittart was launched in 1780 as an East Indiaman. She made three complete voyages for the British East India Company (EIC) and was wrecked in 1789 while outward bound on her way to China on her fourth journey.

== EIC voyage #1 (1780–1782) ==
Captain Robert Young sailed from Portsmouth on 3 June 1780, bound for China and Benkulen. Vansittart arrived at Whampoa on 28 February 1781. Inward bound, she crossed the Second Bar on 16 April. She reached Benkulen on 31 July. She visited Padang on 19 August, before returning to Benkulen on 25 September. Homeward bound, she reached St Helena on 17 December and arrived at The Downs on 31 March 1782.

== EIC voyage #2 (1783–1785) ==
Captain William Agnew sailed from Portsmouth on 11 March 1783, bound for Madras, Bengal, and Benkulen. Vansittart was at São Tiago on 31 May and Johanna on 16 July.

On 24 August, Duke of Kingston caught fire off Ceylon and was destroyed. Vansittart was able to save one man who had clung to a piece of wreckage. Some 65 passengers, crew, troops, and their dependents died. Kingston was in company not only with Vansittart but also Pigot and Earl of Oxford, all of which were safe.

Vansittart reached Madras on 26 August. She stopped at Masulipatam on 26 September before arriving at Bengal on 16 October. She left Bengal on 13 February 1784 and arrived at Benkulen on 11 March. She left Benkulen on 12 April and reached Batavia on 28 April. She did not leave Batavia until 12 July, but then reached Masulipatam on 20 September, and returned to Bengal on 13 October. A report from Bengal dated 23 October stated that 14 Indiamen had been detained there but would be able to leave after 10 November. Vansittart left Bengal on 15 January 1785, reached St Helena on 16 April, and arrived at The Downs on 15 July.

== EIC voyage #3 (1786–1788) ==
Captain Richard Lewin jr., sailed from The Downs on 20 February 1786, bound for Madras and China. Vansittart reached Johanna on 27 May and arrived at Madras on 22 June. Continuing her voyage, she was at Malacca on 24 August, and arrived at Whampoa on 23 September. HOmeward bound, she crossed the Second Bar on 23 January 1787, reached St Helena on 20 May, and arrived at The Downs on 20 July.

== EIC voyage #4 and loss ==
Captain Lestock Wilson sailed from The Downs on 25 March 1789, bound for China. Vansittart was at Batavia on 15 July.

On 23 August as Vansittart continued on her way to China, she wrecked on a rock on the coast of Banca Island in Gaspar Strait. All but one of her crew of 115 men survived the wrecking, though the boatswain and five men were lost in her gig after the survivors took to the boats. On 26 August the survivors reached Nonsuch, Captain Canning, and another country ship, General Elliot, Captain Lloyd. Vansittart was carrying chests of dollars worth £45,000 for the EIC, and £11,000 of private treasure. Captains Canning and Lloyd agreed with Captain Wilson of Vansitart to attempt the salvage of the treasure in return for one-third of what they were able to recover. Nonsuch and General Elliot sailed on 30 August to the site of the loss. There they were able to recover 40 chests, worth about £40,000. Some of the survivors then sailed Vansittart's cutter to Penang, while others, including Wilson, went on to Canton in Nonsuch, or Batavia in General Elliot. (Note: One of the survivors was Francis Beaufort, the future admiral and inventor of the Beaufort scale. It was his first voyage at sea.)

Lloyd's List reported that the Malays had burnt the wreck to the water's edge.

The invoice value of her cargo was £90,655.

== Postscript ==
The wreck of Vansittart was discovered in 1975. Lead ingots made by W. Blackett and dated 1787 have been recovered from the wreck.
