= French ship Vulcain =

France has had at least three ships named Vulcain:

- French ship Commerce de Paris (1806), a 110-gun ship of the line launched in 1806. She was renamed Commerce (1830), Borda (1839), and finally Vulcain (1863) and was scrapped in 1885.
- French repair ship Vulcain, an Achelous-class repair ship, launched in 1943 as USS Agenor (ARL-3), transferred to France as Vulcain in 1951, and transferred again to the Republic of China as Wu Tai in 1957. Her fate is unknown.
- French minesweeper Vulcain, a Vulcain-class minesweeper launched in 1986 and currently in service.
