= HMS Arrogant (1761) =

74-gun Royal Navy ship of the line

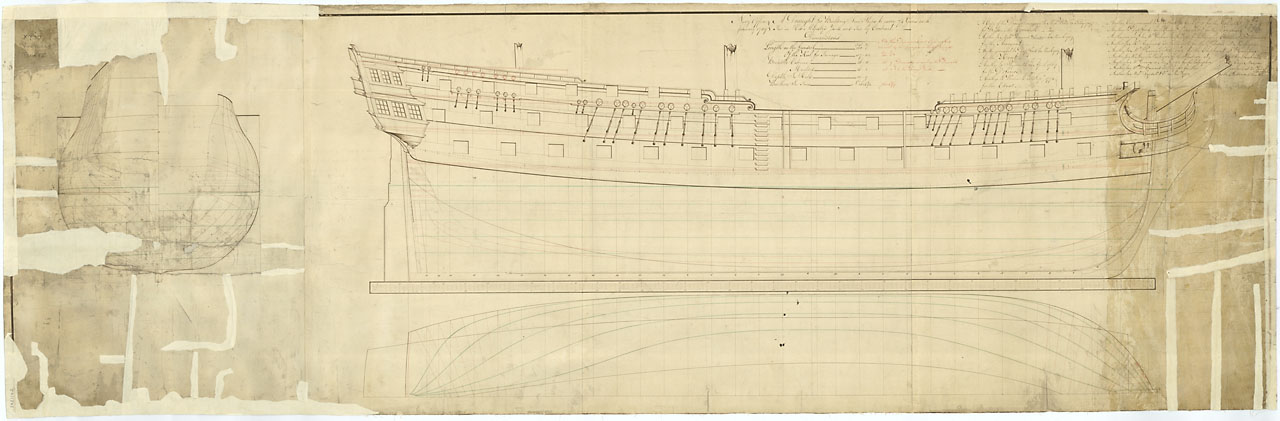
- Arrogant

History

Great Britain
- Name: HMS Arrogant
- Ordered: 13 December 1758
- Builder: John Barnard & John Turner, Harwich Dockyard
- Laid down: March 1759
- Launched: 22 January 1761
- Commissioned: January 1761
- Fate: Sold out of service, 1810

General characteristics
- Class & type: Arrogant-class ship of the line
- Tons burthen: 1,644 54/94 bm
- Length: 168 ft 3 in (51.28 m) (gundeck); 138 ft 0 in (42.06 m) (keel)
- Beam: 47 ft 4 in (14.43 m)
- Depth of hold: 19 ft 9 in (6.02 m)
- Sail plan: Full-rigged ship
- Armament: Gundeck: 28 × 32-pounder guns; Upper gundeck: 28 × 18-pounder guns; QD: 14 × 9-pounder guns; Fc: 4 × 9-pounder guns

HMS Arrogant was a 74-gun third rate ship of the line of the Royal Navy, built of Suffolk oak by John Barnard and launched on 22 January 1761 at King's Yard Harwich. She was the first of the Arrogant-class ships of the line, designed by Sir Thomas Slade.

== Service ==
Her first captain was John Amherst.

Francis Light, founder of Penang, was a midshipman on Arrogant in 1761.

In 1770 she was a guard ship at Portsmouth.

Captain Taylor Penny took command in January 1779.

On 12 April 1782 she was recently re-equipped and was second in line in the main wave of attack on the French fleet at the Battle of the Saintes under captaincy of Samuel Cornish and under the overall command of Admiral George Rodney.

Arrogant was at Plymouth on 20 January 1795 and so shared in the proceeds of the detention of the Dutch naval vessels, East Indiamen, and other merchant vessels that were in port on the outbreak of war between Britain and the Netherlands.

Later in 1795 Arrogant was posted to the East Indies.

She took part in the action of 8 September 1796 and in January 1799 was with the British squadron at the defence of Macau during the Macau Incident.

On 7 May 1800 she was anchored in the Sunda Strait.

On 4 August 1800, under command of Capt. Osborne, she captured privateer "L'Uni" and recaptured her prize American ship "Friendship" off Masulipatam.

By 1804 she had been downgraded to a hulk ship (masts and rigging removed) at Bombay where she served as a receiving ship, sheer hulk, and floating battery. In 1810 she was condemned as unfit for further service. She was sold out of service at Bombay in 1810. It is unclear if she was then broken or re-used as an Indian ship.

== Bibliography ==
- Lavery, Brian (1983) The Ship of the Line – Volume 1: The development of the battlefleet 1650–1850. Conway Maritime Press. ISBN 0-85177-252-8.
- Parkinson, Cyril Northcote (1954) War in the Eastern Seas, 1793–1815. (George Allen & Unwin).
- Winfield, Rif (2008). British Warships in the Age of Sail 1793–1817: Design, Construction, Careers and Fates. Seaforth. ISBN 978-1-86176-246-7.
