= Jean-Marie Renaud =

French naval commander

- Born: 1753
- Died: 16 February 1805 (aged 51–52)
- Service / branch: French Navy
- Rank: Captain
- Commands: Pélagie; Sirène; Ville de Milan
- Battles / wars: French Revolutionary Wars; Battle of Île Ronde

Jean-Marie Renaud (1753 – 16 February 1805) was a French Navy officer. He is mainly known as the commander at the Battle of Île Ronde.

== Career ==
With the rank of Captain, Renaud commanded the India station, comprising the frigates Prudente and Cybèle, under Captain Tréhouart, as well as the brig Coureur, under Lieutenant Garaud.

In October 1794, île de France was blockaded by the British 50-gun Centurion, under Captain Samuel Osborne, and the 44-gun frigate Diomede, under Captain Matthew Smith. Renaud expressed the opinion that, since the British division was too strong to be defeated outright, he should attempt to inflict such damage to its ships that is would be forced to retreat for repairs and abandon the blockade. Taking responsibility for the operation in his own hands, Governor Malartic ordered Renaud to execute his plan. Backed by local privateers and its crews reinforced by volunteers, the French division attacked, yielding the action of 22 October 1794, in which Renaud's plan succeeded. The National Convention voted that the French volunteers from île de France and Réunion, and Renaud's division, had bien mérité de la Patrie.

In 1795, the corvette Pélagie, under Lieutenant Latour-Cassanhiol, joined Renaud's division.

In 1799, Renaud was in charge of the naval station of Guyane, comprising the corvettes Aréthuse and Mutine, under Lieutenant Reybaud.

In 1800, Renaud was in command of the frigate Sirène. He battled two British frigates, and sailed to Cayenne to ferry Commissioner Victor Hugues.

In 1804, Renaud had been promoted to captain and commanded the heavy frigate Ville de Milan. On 16 February, he encountered the British frigate HMS Cleopatra, and was killed in the ensuing action.
