= French brig Duc de Chartres (1780 Saint-Malo) =

History

France
- Name: Duc de Chartres
- Builder: Saint-Malo
- Laid down: 1779
- Launched: 1780
- Renamed: Coureur 29 September 1782
- Fate: Condemned March 1798

General characteristics
- Tons burthen: 80 (French; "of load")
- Propulsion: Sail
- Sail plan: brig
- Armament: 14 × 4-pounder guns

The French brig Duc de Chartres was built between 1779 and 1780 at Saint-Malo as a privateer. The French Navy purchased her in September 1782 at Île de France (Mauritius).

In 1792 the French navy renamed her Coureur. After coppering her, the Navy transferred her back to Mauritius. In November or December 1793 (Frimaire An II) lieutenant de vaisseau Garaud sailed her to Mauritius. Under his command she was present at the battle of Île Ronde on 22 October 1794, but sustained no casualties.

She was condemned at Île de France in March 1798. She was last mentioned in 1801 and her remains were still visible in 1808.
