= French frigate Prudente (1790) =

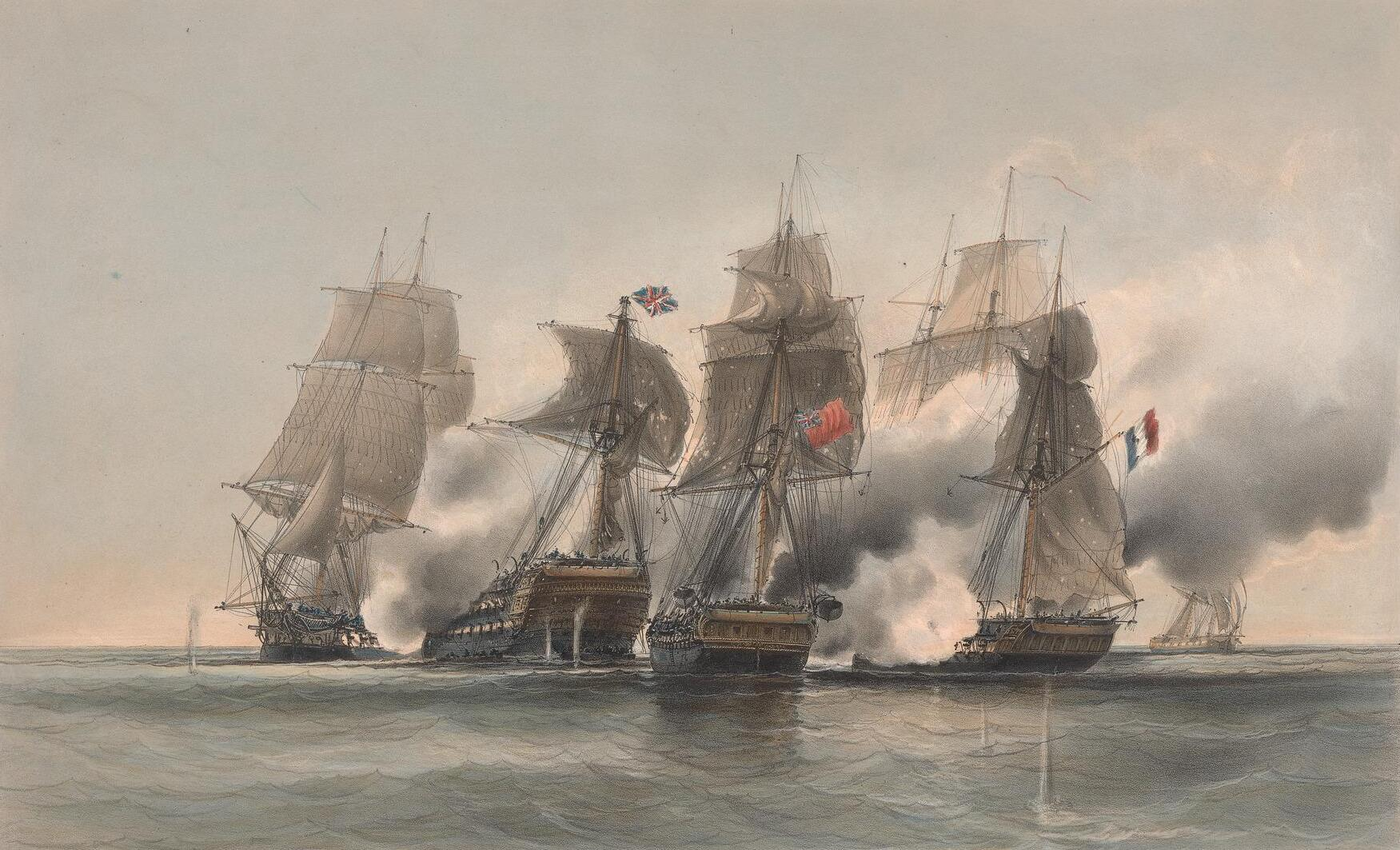
- Prudente (second from right) at the Battle of Île Ronde

History

France
- Name: Prudente
- Namesake: Prudency
- Builder: Lorient
- Laid down: May 1789
- Launched: 21 September 1790
- In service: October 1790
- Captured: 9 February 1799

General characteristics
- Class & type: Capricieuse-class frigate
- Displacement: 1,100 tonneaux
- Tons burthen: 600 port tonneaux
- Length: 44.2 m (145 ft 0 in)
- Beam: 11.2 m (36 ft 9 in)
- Draught: 5.5 m (18 ft 1 in)
- Propulsion: Sail
- Armament: 32 guns

Prudente was a 32-gun Capricieuse-class frigate of the French Navy.

== Career ==
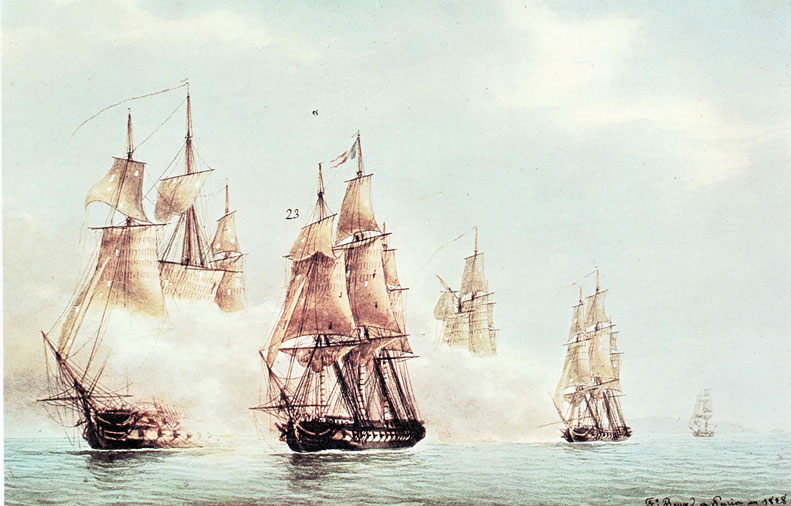
Watercolour portrait of Prudente, by François Roux, commissioned by Willaumez.

In 1791, under lieutenant Villaret de Joyeuse, she was tasked with ferrying troops to Cap-Français and with police duty in Santo Domingo. In 1793, she returned to France, escorting a convoy from Terre-Neuve, under Villaret de Joyeuse, by then promoted to Captain.

In 1794, she was the flagship of a frigate division under Captain Renaud, also comprising Cybèle, under Pierre Julien Tréhouart. She took part in the Sunda Strait campaign of January 1794 and in the action of 22 October 1794 off Ile de France. During the Sunda Strait campaign the squadron captured the East Indiaman Pigot.

In 1796, Prudente was attached to the squadron under Sercey, that had come from France.

She served for a time at Mauritius, taking part in the action of 9 September 1796, before being sold and becoming a privateer in late 1798.

== Capture ==
Daedalus captured Prudente on 9 February 1799 near Table Bay, Cape of Good Hope. At daybreak Daedalus spotted two sails and gave chase to the larger vessel, catching up with her at about 12:30. The quarry struck after an action of almost an hour. She proved to be the Prudente, which Captain H.L. Ball referred to as a French National frigate, rather than a privateer. She was pierced for 42 guns but was armed with twenty-six 12-pounder long guns on her main-deck and two long 6-pounders and two brass howitzers on her quarterdeck. She had a crew of 297 men. In the fight, Daedalus lost two men killed and 12 wounded. Prudente lost 27 men killed and 22 wounded. The ship in her company, which escaped, was American vessel "Concord" that she had taken as a prize on 7 or 9 February.
