= Pierre Julien Tréhouart =

French navy officer

Pierre Julien Tréhouart (Note: Sometimes written "Tréhouarts" (Arnault, p.59)) (French pronunciation: [pjɛʁ ʒyljɛ̃ tʁewaʁ]; Port Louis, 27 November 1759 - Toulon, 9 May 1804) was a French navy officer.

== Career ==
Tréhouart joined the navy as a volunteer in 1775, and was promoted to officer in 1777. In 1779, he rose to lieutenant de frégate and served under Suffren, who commanded him, taking part in five battles on ships of the line, two isolated actions on frigates

Tréhouart was promoted to sub-lieutenant in 1786. In June 1792, he captained the chartered merchantman Chancelière de Brabant, ferrying troops from Lorient to Pondichery. He was promoted to lieutenant later the same year.

As a lieutenant, he captained the Cybèle during the action of 22 October 1794; he was promoted to captain by governor Malartic after the battle, on 24 October 1794. In 1795, Cybèle was attached to the division under Sercey and took part in the action of 8 September 1796, where he ordered a boat launched to tug the becalmed Cybèle into a position where she could rake HMS Victorious. Tréhouart was promoted to chef de division on 19 December 1797.

Tréhouart returned to France on Cybèle and arrived in Rochefort in june or july of 1797. He was then appointed to command the Formidable on 9 April 1798. He retained this command for one year. Later he captained the newly built Neptune.

He was awarded the rank of officer in the Legion of Honour on 14 June 1804, after his death.

== See also ==
- Bernard Thomas Tréhouart de Beaulieu (représentant du Peuple)
- François Thomas Tréhouart
- Julien Tréhouart-Deschenais

== Notes and references ==
=== Bibliography ===
- Arnault, Antoine-Vincent (1827). Biographie nouvelle des contemporains [1787-1820] (in French). Vol. 20.
- Rouvier, Charles (1868). Histoire des marins français sous la République, de 1789 à 1803 (in French). Arthus Bertrand.
- Troude, Onésime-Joachim (1867). Batailles navales de la France (in French). Vol. 2. Challamel ainé.
- Troude, Onésime-Joachim (1867). Batailles navales de la France (in French). Vol. 4. Challamel ainé.
- Fonds Marine. Campagnes (opérations; divisions et stations navales; missions diverses). Inventaire de la sous-série Marine BB4. Tome premier : BB4 1 à 482 (1790-1826)

=== External links ===
- Nomination of Tréhouart, culture.gouv.fr
