= Battle of Île Ronde =

1794 battle of the East Indies theatre of the French Revolutionary Wars

- Part of the East Indies theatre of the French Revolutionary Wars
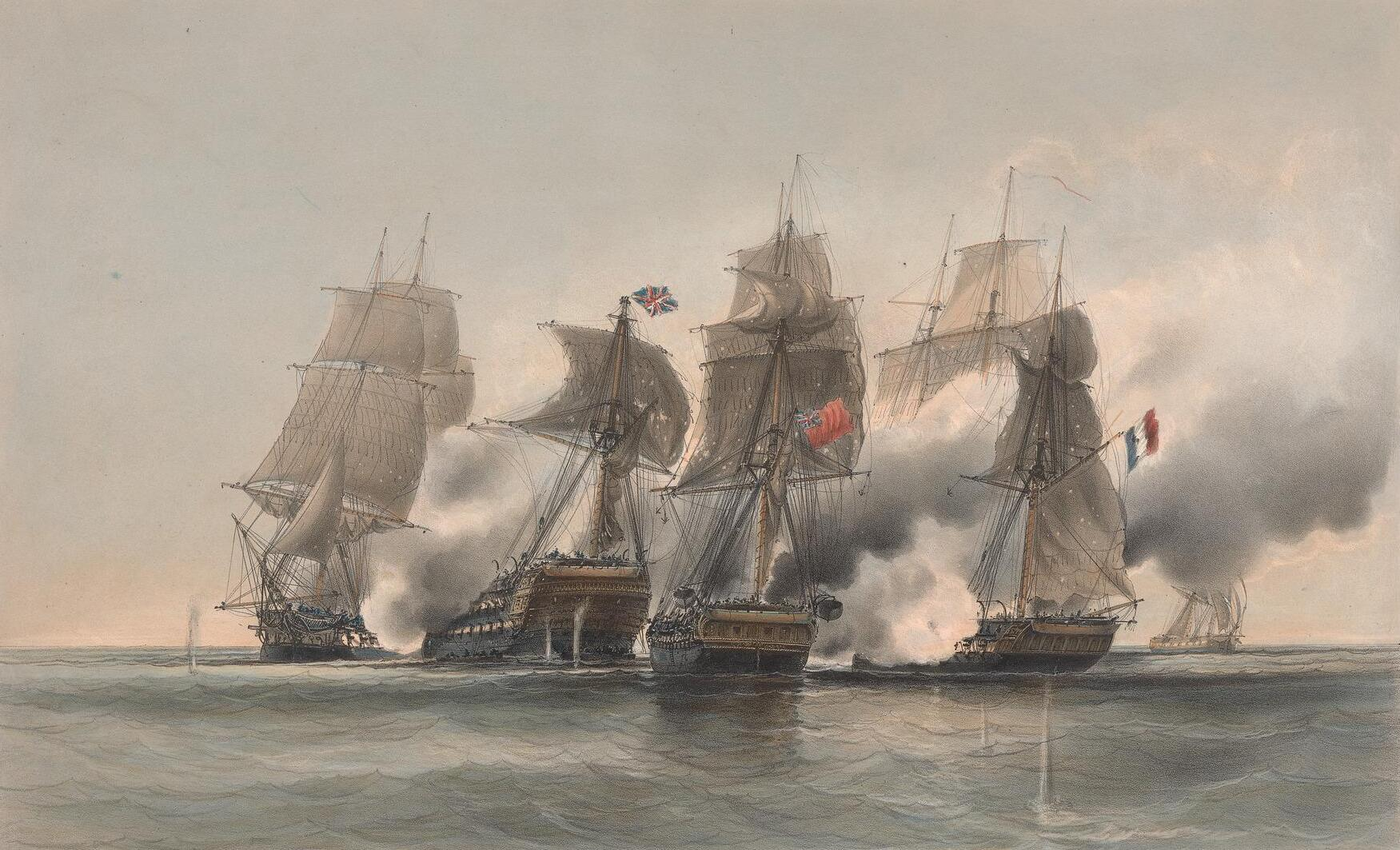
- 1844 illustration of the battle
Date	22 October 1794
Location	Off Isle de France, Indian Ocean
Result	Inconclusive

Belligerents
France	Great Britain

Commanders and leaders
Jean-Marie Renaud	Samuel Osborne

Strength
2 frigates	1 ship of the line; 1 frigate

Casualties and losses
38 killed; 105 wounded	3 killed; 26 wounded

The Battle of Île Ronde was fought between a French Navy and Royal Navy squadron off Isle de France on 22 October 1794 during the East Indies theatre of the French Revolutionary Wars. It was fought over control of the waters around Isle de France, which was under blockade from the British squadron as French warships and privateers operating from the island posed a significant threat to vital British trade routes connected to British India and China.

In an attempt to neutralise the island, the British commander in the region, Peter Rainier ordered the 50-gun HMS Centurion and 44-gun HMS Diomede to institute a blockade, which began in October 1794. Concerned by food shortages and a rebellious slave population the French naval commander Jean-Marie Renaud led his small squadron comprising frigates Cybèle and Prudente and three smaller vessels to drive off the British squadron. On 22 October 1794, the squadrons met off Île Ronde, an islet off northern Isle de France.

The battle lasted two and a quarter hours, in which Centurion and Cybèle fought a close duel which left both ships badly damaged. Supported by the remainder of the squadron, Cybèle successfully withdrew under fire, but Centurion, without support from the distant Diomede was also forced to retire for repairs. Unable to continue the blockade the British force returned to India, allowing food supplies to reach Isle de France. Due to the necessity for campaigns against Dutch Ceylon and the Dutch East Indies, the British blockade was not renewed, but the French were unable to take advantage of this due to increasing civil unrest among their slaves.

== Background ==
War between the French Republic and Great Britain began on 1 February 1793, news arriving among the French and British East Indian colonies on 11 June 1793. The strongest French positions in the Indian Ocean were the colonies of Isle de France and Réunion, which lay substantially to the west of the British bases at Bombay and Madras in British India. A small French frigate squadron, supported by smaller warships and privateers operated from the islands posing a considerable threat to British maritime trade in the Indian Ocean.

To counter the threat the British commander in the region, Captain Peter Rainier ordered two of his ships to blockade the island during the summer of 1794. Rainer's force comprised the fourth rate ship 50-gun HMS Centurion under Captain Samuel Osborne and the large 44-gun frigate HMS Diomede under Captain Matthew Smith. Together the ships sailed from Madras on 30 August 1794, stopping at the allied port of Trincomalee in Dutch Ceylon and the undefended French-controlled island of Rodrigues before arriving off Isle de France in October.

Isle de France had been in a state of turmoil since the French Revolution and in 1792 the republican faction in the colony seized control. In 1794 suspected royalists were arrested, including naval officer Armand de Saint-Félix, their executions forestalled by the arrival of news that the French Convention had abolished slavery. Only the intervention of Governor Anne Joseph Hippolyte de Maurès, Comte de Malartic prevented unrest. The preoccupation of the naval authorities had prevented any offensive operations and the reduced squadron, now commanded by Captain Jean-Marie Renaud, remained in Port Louis.

== Battle ==
Despite the upheaval on shore, the arrival of the British blockade squadron provoked Renaud into taking action. Although the defences of Isle de France were well prepared under Malartic's orders, food supplies were running low, with only rice still available in quantity. The potential for famine and consequent social unrest among the slave population was severe and Renaud sailed immediately to intercept Centurion and Diomede. The French squadron comprised the 40-gun frigate Cybèle under Captain Pierre Tréhouart, the 36-gun Prudente under Renaud, and the 14-gun brig Coureur under lieutenant de vaisseau Garaud. (Note: Some sources spell Garaud's name as "Garreau".) The 20-gun privateer corvettes Jean-Bart and Rosalie, as well as the aviso Sans-Culotte, (Note: This appears to be Sans-Culotte, a privateer from Isle de France commissioned in October 1794. A brig of the same name, used as a slave ship in 1796, might be identified with this ship. She could also possibly be the Sans-Culotte the 8-gun HMS Rose captured in July 1796.) accompanied the two frigates. The ships' crews were heavily augmented by volunteers, including a young Robert Surcouf on Cybèle, as well as a detachment of soldiers.

Renaud's squadron sailed on 19 October, seeking the British to the north of the island. At 11:00 on 22 October, close to the uninhabited islet of Île Ronde northwest of Isle de France, the French sighted the British. Osborne issued orders to sail towards the French squadron; Renaud responded by forming his ships in a line of battle and advancing to meet Osborne. Prudente led the French line, closely followed by Cybèle, Jean-Bart, and Coureur, Osborne focusing on Prudente and ordering Smith to engage Cybèle.

Firing began at 15:29 when Prudente unleashed a close range broadside at Centurion, followed immediately by fire from the ships of both sides. Centurion was damaged in the opening exchanges and by 16:00 had most of her sails and rigging torn. At this Renaud ordered his squadron to pull back to leeward out of range, each firing on Centurion as they passed.

As Cybèle came within range of Centurion Cybèle's fire brought down Centurion's mizen topmast and fore topgallantmast. Return fire from Centurion managed however so to damage Cybèle that she was unable to retreat in the light winds; the two largely immobilised ships then began a close range duel. For more than an hour the exchange continued, Renaud unable to intervene from leeward and Smith repeatedly refusing Osborne's orders to support his ship, Diomede remaining at long range and contributing an intermittent and inaccurate fire on the distant Cybèle. At 17:15 a light breeze enabled Tréhouart to slowly pull Cybèle towards Renaud's force despite the loss of the main topgallantmast. At 17:45, with Prudente close by, the main topmast fell on Cybèle, which had 3 feet (0.91 m) of water in the hold, but Osborne, outnumbered and with his ship damaged, reluctantly withdrew. With the threat lifted, Renaud was able to take Cybèle under tow and retire in the direction of Isle de France, followed distantly and ineffectually by Diomede until night fell.

=== Order of battle ===
In this table, "Guns" refers to all cannon carried by the ship, including the maindeck guns which were taken into consideration when calculating its rate, as well as any carronades carried aboard. Broadside weight records the combined weight of shot which could be fired in a single simultaneous discharge of an entire broadside.

Ship	Commander	Navy	Guns	Tons	Broadside weight	Complement	Casualties		
Ship	Commander	Navy	Guns	Tons	Broadside weight	Complement	Killed	Wounded	Total
HMS Centurion	Captain Samuel Osborne	Royal Navy	54	1044bm	462 pounds (210 kg)	315	3	23	26
HMS Diomede	Captain Matthew Smith	Royal Navy	54	891 bm	408 pounds (185 kg)	297	0	0	0
Prudente	Commodore Jean-Marie Renaud	French Navy	40	600 (Note: Winfield and Roberts report a displacement of 600 tons (French; unladen) for the Capricieuse-class frigates, of which Prudente was a member.)	280 pounds (130 kg)	300	15	20	35
Cybèle	Captain Pierre Tréhouart	French Navy	44	744 (Note: French; displacement unladen.)	410 pounds (190 kg)	330	22	62	84
Jean-Bart (Note: Jean Bart was probably a corvette of 500 tons (French; "of load"), 20 guns, and about 180 men. She was commissioned in August 1794 and renamed Entreprise circa 1795.)		French Navy	20	500 (French; "of load")	Unknown	180	1	5	6
Coureur	lieutenant de vaisseau Garaud	French Navy	14	80 (French; "of load")	28 pounds (13 kg)	Unknown	0	0	0
Based on: Clowes 1997, p. 488.

== Aftermath ==
The immediate result of the battle was inconclusive, both squadrons retiring with one ship damaged apiece. French losses had been heavy, with 15 killed and 20 wounded on Prudente, the latter including Renaud and 22 killed and 62 wounded on Cybèle. One sailor was killed and five wounded on Jean-Bart and no casualties were reported on Courier. By contrast, Centurion had only three men killed and 23 wounded and Diomede none at all, but the damage to Osborne's ship was more problematic; while Renaud could repair and resupply his ships in nearby Port Louis, Centurion had to return to India, several thousand miles away, to effect repairs. Osborne was thus forced to abandon the blockade, with Centurion sailing to Bombay and Diomede to Madras.

The action brought repercussions for Smith, whose failure to support Osborne was noted; although Smith claimed that he was simply maintaining the line of battle, it subsequently emerged that the captains had engaged in a personal dispute resulting in Smith deciding to refuse Osborne's orders. After his behaviour had featured in Osborne's initial dispatch, Smith challenged his account and Osborne demanded a court-martial held to investigate. This panel decided that Smith's behaviour was unacceptable and he was dismissed from the Navy, by which time he had lost Diomede, wrecked on a rock in Trincomalee Bay on 2 August 1795 during the invasion of Ceylon. Although Smith appealed his sentence and was restored to the captain's list in 1798 he was never again called to service and retired in 1806.

British historians have considered that Smith's refusal to participate probably cost Osborne the battle. William James wrote that his behaviour was "the principle [sic] reason that Cybèle, at least, was not made a prize of by the British". C. Northcote Parkinson considers the action "indecisive" but concurs with James' assessment that Smith's intervention could have resulted in a British victory but instead that "the first encounter of the war between the French and English in the East Indies had resulted in what was tantamount to defeat for the latter".

On Isle de France the relief of the blockade meant that shipping, particularly American vessels laden with food supplies from Tamatave on Madagascar, could reach the island and the threatened famine was averted. French privateers were also again free to operate against British trade, particularly in the Bay of Bengal. With Renaud's squadron still at Port Louis, Rainier considered renewing the blockade, but was dissuaded by the dangers of the monsoon season and a false report that a squadron of French ships of the line was soon due to arrive on Isle de France. In 1795 he was distracted by the sudden need to guard against the Dutch East India colonies following the French conquest of the Netherlands, and he supervised the invasion of Ceylon and operations against the Dutch East Indies. By the time his attention turned once more to Isle de France, it had been heavily reinforced in early 1796 by a frigate squadron commanded by Counter-admiral Pierre César Charles de Sercey.
