= French frigate Cybèle (1789) =

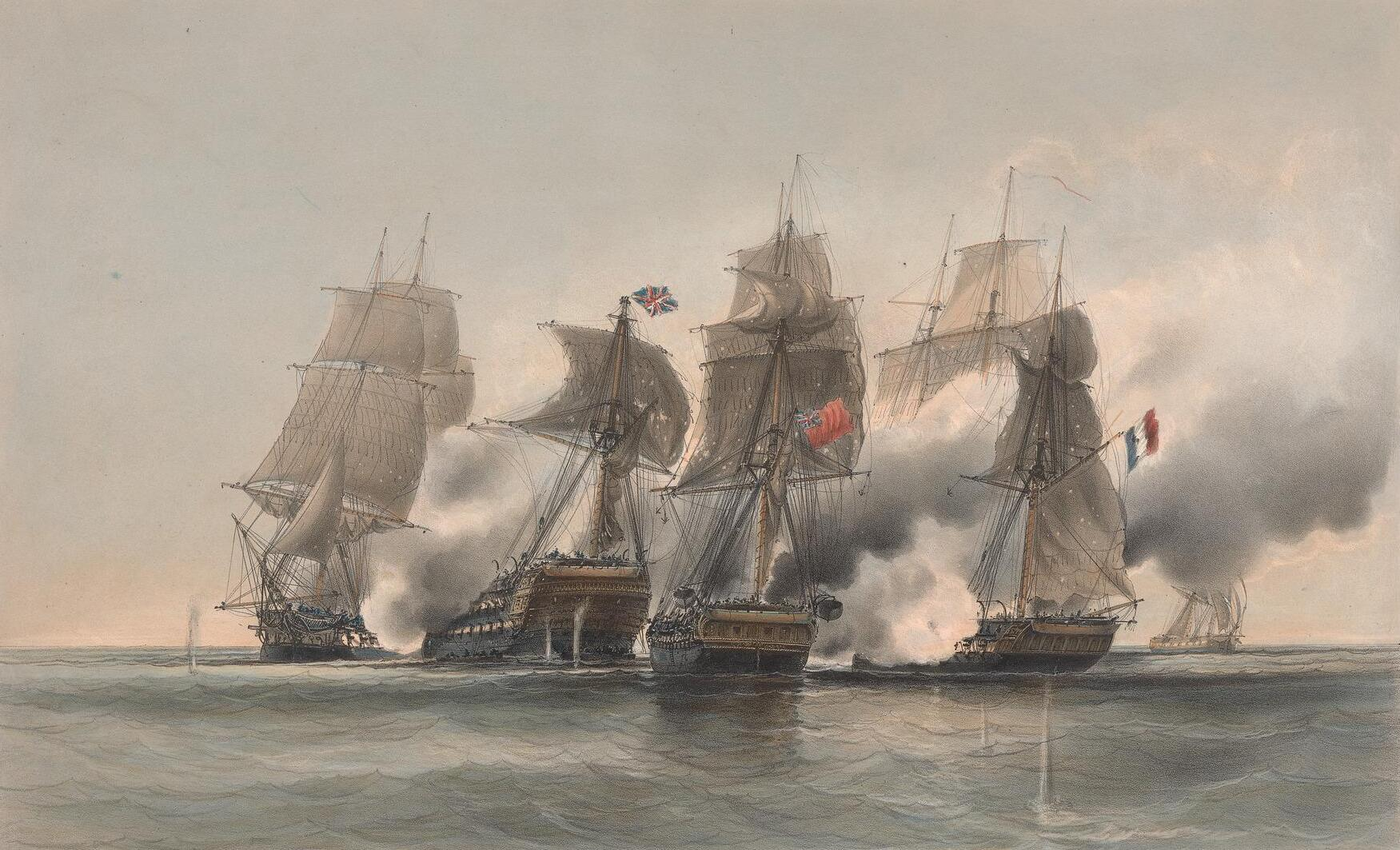
- Cybèle (first from left) at the Battle of Île Ronde

History

France
- Name: Cybèle
- Namesake: Cybele
- Builder: Pierre-Augustin Lamothe (fils), Brest
- Laid down: July 1788
- Launched: 7 July 1789
- Commissioned: May 1790
- Fate: Wrecked 24 February 1809

General characteristics
- Class & type: Nymphe-class frigate
- Displacement: 1,423 tonneaux
- Tons burthen: 744 port tonneaux
- Length: 46.9 m (153 ft 10 in)
- Beam: 11.9 m (39 ft 1 in)
- Draught: 5.8 m (19 ft 0 in)
- Propulsion: Sail
- Armament: 40 guns: 28 × 18-pounder long guns; 12 × 8-pounder long guns; 4 × carronnades
- Armour: Timber

Cybèle was a 40-gun Nymphe-class frigate of the French Navy.

== Career ==
=== Sunda Strait campaign of January 1794 ===
In May 1792, under Captain Armand de Saint-Félix, Cybèle departed Brest, bound for Port Louis, where she arrived in December 1792. She cruised off the Malabar, Mahé and Pondichéry.

In 1794, Cybèle was part of a frigate division under Jean-Marie Renaud, along with Prudente. She took part in the Sunda Strait campaign of January 1794. During the Sunda Strait campaign the squadron captured the East Indiaman Pigot.

She also participated in the action of 22 October 1794 off Ile de France under Pierre Julien Tréhouart. Robert Surcouf volunteered to serve as an officer for the action and earned his first command for his behaviour on that day.

In 1796 she took part in patrols in the Indian Ocean in Admiral Sercey's squadron, notably taking part in the action of 8 September 1796.

Returned to France, she was twice refitted in Rochefort, first from 29 April 1798 and later from 19 November 1802. In 1803, her armament was increased to 44 guns, with 28 18-pounders in the battery, 12 8-pounders and 4 36-pounder obusiers de vaisseau, under Captain Louis-André Senez.

=== L'Hermite's expedition ===
In 1806 Cybèle, was attached to a squadron under Commodore Jean-Marthe-Adrien L'Hermite, along with the 74-gun Régulus, the frigate Président and the brig-corvette Surveillant. During L'Hermite's expedition, she took part in the capture of the brig HMS Favourite and of about 20 merchantmen, notably the slave ships Otway and Plowers (Plover).

On 18 August, a hurricane scattered the squadron between Saint Domingue and Bermuda, and Cybèle lost 38 men before taking shelter in the Chesapeake. Cybèle then returned by 1807.

=== Battle of Les Sables-d'Olonne ===
On 24 February 1809, under Captain Raymond Cocault, she took part in the Battle of Les Sables-d'Olonne, where she had eight killed and 16 wounded. The battle left her aground and the hull so badly damaged that she was broken up.
