= List of ship launches in 1786 =

The list of ship launches in 1786 includes a chronological list of some ships launched in 1786.

Date	Ship	Class	Builder	Location	Country	Notes
20 January	Mexicano	Santa Ana-class ship of the line		Havana	(Spain) Cuba	For Spanish Navy.
5 February	Hartwell	East Indiaman		Itchenor	Great Britain	For British East India Company.
23 February	Réunion	Magicienne-class frigate		Toulon	Kingdom of France	For French Navy.
February	Bridgewater	East Indiaman	William Barnard	Deptford	Great Britain	For British East India Company.
18 March	Modeste	Magicienne-class frigate		Toulon	Kingdom of France	For French Navy.
11 April	Saint Alexander	Slava Ekateriny-class ship of the line	S. I. Afanaseyev	Kherson	Russia	For Imperial Russian Navy.
13 April	Apostolov Andrei	Frigate	S. I. Afanaseyev	Kherson	Russia	For Imperial Russian Navy.
15 April	Hannibal	Arrogant-class ship of the line	Perry	Blackwall Yard	Great Britain	For Royal Navy.
15 April	Impregnable	London-class ship of the line		Deptford Dockyard	Great Britain	For Royal Navy.
28 April	Papillon	Brig of war	Benjamin Dunbois	Saint-Malo	Kingdom of France	For French Navy.
29 April	Severn	Adventure-class ship of the line	Hilhouse	Bristol	Great Britain	For Royal Navy.
3 May	Pallade	Pallade-class frigate	Piero Beltrame	Venice	Republic of Venice	For Venetian Navy.
14 May	Panteleimon	Aziia-class ship of the line	M. D. Portnov	Arkhangelsk	Russia	For Imperial Russian Navy.
14 May	Sviatoi Piotr	Iaroslav-class ship of the line	M. D. Portnov	Arkhangelsk	Russia	For Imperial Russian Navy.
16 May	Kir Ioann	Iaroslav-class ship of the line	M. D. Portnov	Arkhangelsk	Russia	For Imperial Russian Navy.
17 May	Nadezhda Blagopoluchiia	Modified Pavel-class frigate	M. D. Portnov	Arkhangelsk	Russia	For Imperial Russian Navy.
30 May	Venere	Pallade-class frigate	Girardo Minao	Venice	Republic of Venice	For Venetian Navy.
May	Dover	Adventure-class ship	George Parsons	Bursledon	Great Britain	For Royal Navy.
10 July	Blanche	Hermione-class frigate	Thomas Calhoun & John Nowlan	Bursledon	Great Britain	For Royal Navy.
26 July	Leiden	Third rate	John May	Amsterdam	Dutch Republic	For Dutch Navy.
24 August	Elephant	Arrogant-class ship of the line	George Parsons	Bursledon	Great Britain	For Royal Navy.
11 September	Royal Sovereign	First rate	Thomas Pollard	Plymouth Dockyard	Great Britain	For Royal Navy.
25 September	Theseus	Culloden-class ship of the line	John Perry	Blackwall Yard	Great Britain	For Royal Navy.
25 September	Thetis	East Indiaman	Perry	Blackwall	Great Britain	For British East India Company.
2 October	Zephier	Fifth rate		Amsterdam	Dutch Republic	For Dutch Navy.
6 October	Bellerophon	Arrogant-class ship of the line	Edward Greaves & Co.	Frindsbury	Great Britain	For Royal Navy.
16 October	Sugar Cane	Merchantman		Rotherhithe	Great Britain	For Turner & Co.
20 October	Vestnik	Cutter	D. Masalsky	Saint Petersburg	Russia	For Imperial Russian Navy.
October	Melville Castle	East Indiaman	William Barnard	Deptford	Great Britain	For British East India Company.
October	Princess Royal	East Indiaman	Wells		Great Britain	For British East India Company.
4 November	Conde de Regla	Santa Ana-class ship of the line		Havana	(Spain) Cuba	For Spanish Navy.
8 November	Princess Amelia	East Indiaman	Barnard & Dudman, or Randall	Deptford	Great Britain	For British East India Company.
20 November	Capricieuse	Capricieuse-class frigate		Lorient	Kingdom of France	For French Navy.
22 November	Saturn	Arrogant-class ship of the line	Raymond	Northam	Great Britain	For Royal Navy.
23 November	Aquilon	Hermione-class frigate	Edward Hunt	Rotherhithe	Great Britain	For Royal Navy.
November	Earl of Wycombe	East Indiaman	Smallshaw & Rogers	Liverpool	Great Britain	For British East India Company.
November	Henry Dundas	East Indiaman	Perry	Blackwall	Great Britain	For British East India Company.
November	Minerva	East Indiaman	Perry	Blackwall	Great Britain	For British East India Company.
November	Rose	East Indiaman	Wells	Deptford	Great Britain	For British East India Company.
21 December	Santa Florentina	Frigate	Arsenal de Cartagena	Cartagena	Spain	For Spanish Navy.
21 December	Woodcot	East Indiaman	Wells	Deptford	Great Britain	For British East India Company.
Unknown date	Berislav	Kinburn-class frigate		Gnilotonskaya	Russia	For Imperial Russian Navy.
Unknown date	Bridport	Sloop	Nicholas Bools	Bridport	Great Britain	For George Brown, Nicholas Bools, Joseph Gundry and others.
Unknown date	Broderick	Whaler		North Shields	Great Britain	For private owner.
Unknown date	Castor	Fifth rate		Rotterdam	Dutch Republic	For Dutch Navy.
Unknown date	Commerce	Merchantman		Bermuda	(Kingdom of Great Britain) Bermuda	For private owner.
Unknown date	Duchess of Rutland	Merchantman		Dublin	Ireland	For private owner.
Unknown date	Earl Fitzwilliam	East Indiaman	Barnard	Deptford	Great Britain	For British East India Company.
Unknown date	Edinburgh	Paddle vessel	Patrick Miller	Leith	United Kingdom	For Patrick Miller. Steam power added in 1787.
Unknown date	Endeavour	Sloop	Nicholas Bools	Bridport	Great Britain	For Randall family and another.
Unknown date	Fanagoriia	Kinburn-class frigate		Gnilotonskaya	Russia	For Imperial Russian Navy.
Unknown date	Golden Grove	West Indiaman		Teignmouth	Great Britain	For private owner.
Unknown date	Hannah	Slave ship		Liverpool	Great Britain	For Benjamin Heywood.
Unknown date	Harriot	West Indiaman		Liverpool	Great Britain	For private owner.
Unknown date	Indfødsretten	Indfødsretten-class ship of the line			Denmark-Norway	For Dano-Norwegian Navy.
Unknown date	Jean Bart	Corvette		Bayonne	Kingdom of France	For French Navy.
Unknown date	Kinburn	Kinburn-class frigate		Gnilotonskaya	Russia	For Imperial Russian Navy.
Unknown date	Lady Penrhyn	Slave ship	Edward Greaves	River Thames	Great Britain	For Curtis & Co.
Unknown date	Latona	Merchantman		Newcastle upon Tyne	Great Britain	For private owner.
Unknown date	Lord Walsingham	East Indiaman		Great Yarmouth	Great Britain	For British East India Company.
Unknown date	Mercury	Merchantman		Topsham	Great Britain	For John St Barbe.
Unknown date	Milford	Merchantman		Bombay Dockyard	India	For Pestonjee Bomanjee.
Unknown date	Nuestra Señora de las Mercedes	Frigate		Havana	(Spain) Cuba	For Spanish Navy.
Unknown date	Othello	Slave ship		Liverpool	Great Britain	For Mr. Earle.
Unknown date	Partenope	Third rate	Antonio Imbert	Castellamare del Golfo	Kingdom of Sicily	For Royal Sicilian Navy.
Unknown date	Pluto	Third rate	J. Hand	Medemblik	Dutch Republic	For Dutch Navy.
Unknown date	Rawlinson	Merchantman	John Brockbank	Lancaster	Great Britain	For private owner.
Unknown date	Selby	Merchantman		Whitby	Great Britain	For private owner.
Unknown date	Sireene	Ship-sloop		Harlingen	Dutch Republic	For Dutch Navy.
Unknown date	Staaten Generaal	Third rate			Dutch Republic	For Dutch Navy.
Unknown date	Waakzaamheid	Sixth rate	J. Hand	Enkhuizen	Dutch Republic	For Dutch Navy.
Unknown date	William Beckford	Merchantman	John Brockbank	Lancaster	Great Britain	For private owner.
Unknown date	Woolwich Chain Boat	Chain boat	William Cleverley	Gravesend	Great Britain	For Royal Navy.
Unknown date	Name unknown	Merchantman			Spain	For private owner.
Unknown date	Name unknown	Merchantman		Bermuda	(Kingdom of Great Britain) Bermuda	For private owner.
Unknown date	Name unknown	Merchantman		Liverpool	Great Britain	For private owner.
Unknown date	Name unknown	Merchantman			Sweden	For private owner.
Unknown date	Name unknown	Merchantman			Spain	For private owner.
