= HMS Resolue =

Two vessels have served the British Royal Navy as HMS Resolue, the French from "Resolute". Both were captured French ships:

- HMS Resolue was the French Iphigénie-class frigate Résolue of 32 guns launched in 1778 that the British Royal Navy captured in 1798; HMS Resolue served as a slops ship and a receiving ship at Portsmouth until she was broken up in 1811.
- HMS Resolue was the Spanish xebec O Hydra, that the French captured in 1794 and renamed Résolue in 1795. The British captured her in 1795; she was last listed in 1802.

== See also ==
- HMS Resolute
- French ship Résolue
