= Houghton (1782 EIC ship) =

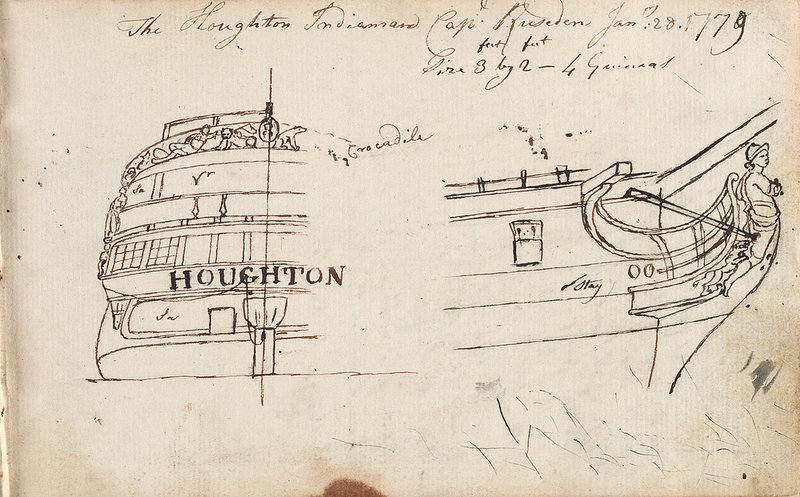
- Sketch by Thomas Luny of the stern and bow and figurehead of the proposed East Indiaman Houghton, dated 28 January 1779, National Maritime Museum

History

British East India Company
- Name: Houghton
- Owner: Voyages #1-6: Cullen (or Cullem) Smith; Voyage #7: James Rees
- Builder: Wells, Deptford
- Launched: 23 September 1782
- Fate: Foundered 1803

General characteristics
- Tons burthen: 778, or 77820/94, or 800, (bm)
- Length: 145 ft 6 1/2 in (44.4 m) (overall); 118 ft 7 in (36.1 m) (keel)
- Beam: 35 ft 2 in (10.7 m)
- Depth of hold: 14 ft 10 in (4.5 m)
- Propulsion: Sail
- Complement: 1793: 99; 1799:60
- Armament: 1793: 26 × 6&4-pounder guns; 1794: Upper deck: 24 × long 9-pounder guns; Lower deck: 8 × brass 6-pounder + 2 × iron 6-pounder guns, + 4 light carronades; 1799: 20 × 18-pounder carronades
- Notes: Three decks

Houghton was launched in 1782 and made six voyages as an East Indiaman for the British East India Company (EIC). In 1794 she was part of an EIC squadron that had some success against French privateers and naval vessels in the Sunda Strait, and then in 1796 she participated as a transport in the British capture of St Lucia. She was sold in 1799 and her owner took her out to India to work in the tea trade between India and China. She foundered in 1803.

== EIC voyages ==
Captain James Monro was Houghton's captain for her first four voyages. He purchased the command from his maternal uncle Captain William Smith.

=== EIC voyage #1 (1783–1784) ===
While Monro and Houghton were at Portsmouth, Monro witnessed the mutiny of the 77th Regiment of Foot, who refused to go to India, maintaining that their term of enlistment had expired. Houghton may have been one of the vessels scheduled to transport the regiment.

Houghton sailed from Portsmouth on 11 March 1783, bound for Madras and China. She reached São Tiago on 4 April, and Madras on 19 July. She was at Malacca on 12 August and arrived at Whampoa on 22 October. Homeward bound, she crossed the Second Bar on 6 January 1784, reached St Helena on 27 April, and arrived at the Downs on 27 June.

=== EIC voyage #2 (1784–1786) ===
Houghton sailed from the Downs on 15 December 1784, bound for Madras and China. She reached Madeira on 7 January 1785, Madras on 26 May, and Malacca on 10 July, before arriving at Whampoa on 9 August. Homeward bound, she crossed the Second Bar on 15 October, reached St Helena on 24 February 1786, and arrived at the Downs on 14 May.

=== EIC voyage #3 (1787–1788) ===
Houghton left the Downs on 19 February 1787, bound for Madras and China. She reached Madras on 3 June and Penang on 18 August, and arrived at Whampoa on 20 September. Homeward bound, she crossed the Second Bar on 12 December, reached St Helena on 17 April 1788, and arrived at the Downs on 22 June.

=== EIC voyage #4 (1789–1791) ===
Houghton sailed from Portsmouth on 30 April 1789, bound for Madras and Bengal. She reached Madeira on 22 May and Madras on 3 September, arrived at Diamond Harbour on 22 September. Leaving Calcutta, she was at Saugor on 25 January 1790, Madras on 11 March, and Masulipatam on 6 May. On 8 April she was near Budge Budge, below Calcutta. Several of her crew were in a sloop when a squall caught them and upset her. The men from Houghton, the lascars, and others on board all jumped into the river and made it ashore without anyone suffering material injury. Between March and April she may have transported British troops from Madras to Bengal.

Houghton was again at Diamond Harbour on 25 May. Homeward bound, she was at Madras on 13 September, and St Helena on 21 November, before arriving at the Downs on 22 January 1791.

In spring 1792 Monro sold his captaincy for £8000. In October 1796 the General Court of the EIC petitioned Parliament to pass a law abolishing the practice of captains, or their widows, buying or selling commands.

=== EIC voyage #5 (1793–1795) ===
Captain Robert Hudson received a letter of marque on 21 May 1793. The next day he sailed from Portsmouth, bound for Madras and Bengal. Houghton was part of a convoy that also included HMS Glatton, and the East Indiamen Prince William, Lord Thurlow, William Pitt, Barwell, Earl of Oxford, Ostereley, Fort William, London, Pigot, Marquis of Landsdown, Hillsborough, Ceres, and Earl of Abergavenny, amongst numerous other vessels, merchant and military, most of the non-Indiamen travelling to the Mediterranean.

In late 1793 John Shore, the EIC's Governor-General of India, formed a squadron from the company's own ships to patrol the region. Two East Indiamen, William Pitt and Britannia, and the country ship Nonsuch were diverted from their regular route for the service. A vessel of the Bombay Marine, possibly Viper, accompanied them. The reason for the move was the coming together of two problems, the inability of the British Royal Navy to maintain a presence in the area, and intelligence concerning the presence of French privateers and naval vessels in the area.

The EIC appointed Charles Mitchell, captain of William Pitt, Commodore of the squadron. On 21 January 1794 Houghton joined the squadron. The next day the squadron engaged two French privateers, Vengeur, of 34 guns and 250 men, and Résolue, of 26 guns and 230 men. Britannia captured Vengeur, and Nonsuch captured Résolu, with the French captains realising that further resistance would be pointless as William Pitt and Houghton came up. Eleven French sailors had been killed and 25 wounded on Vengeur; British losses were one killed and two wounded on Britannia. Casualties were high on Résolue, but no numbers are available.

On 24–25 January, the EIC squadron engaged a French naval squadron from Île de France, consisting of the frigates Prudente and Cybèle, the brig Vulcain, and the captured East Indiaman Princess Royal, now renamed Duguay-Trouin. The two squadrons engaged at long range though Houghton and Nonsuch managed to hit Cybèle. The French broke off the engagement and the British did not pursue. The need to man the prizes and to guard the prisoners, who outnumbered their captors, had left the British with just enough men to man the guns. Casualties among the French squadron are not known, but the only loss on the British ships was on Nonsuch, which had a man killed in combat with Cybèle.

Houghton returned to her moorings in Britain on 25 July 1795.

=== West Indies voyage (1796) ===
In late 1795 and early 1796, Houghton sailed as part of Admiral Hugh Cloberry Christian's expedition to the West Indies. The EIC chartered some ten vessels to the Navy to serve as transports. Captain James Urmston, in Sir Edward Hughes was the Commodore for the EIC contingent.

After numerous false starts aborted by weather issues, the fleet sailed on 26 April to invade St Lucia, with troops under Lieutenant-General Sir Ralph Abercromby. St Lucia surrendered to the British on 25 May. The British went on to capture Saint Vincent and Grenada. Although it is not clear when Houghton returned to Britain, Sir Edward Hughes returned to Britain in September 1796.

=== EIC voyage #6 (1797–1798) ===
Hudson sailed Houghton from Portsmouth on 6 April 1797, bound for Madras and Bengal. She reached Madras on 27 July, and Diamond Harbour on 20 September. Homeward bound, she was at Saugor on 16 November, reached the Cape on 15 February 1798 and St Helena on 20 March, Cork on 24 June, and the Downs on 8 July.

== Merchantman ==
Captain James Rees purchased Houghton in 1799 to engage in the tea trade between Canton and Bombay. Rees received a letter of marque on 22 May 1799. On 6 September he sailed from Portsmouth for the Far East, to remain.

In October 1800 Earl Talbot struck the reefs around Pratas Island in the South China Sea and foundered with the loss of all hands. Houghton sighted the wreckage as she was sailing from Canton and reported the news when she arrived at Bombay. The EIC sent two ships from Bombay to search for survivors.

== Fate ==
Houghton foundered in 1803 in a typhoon in the China Sea. One report gives the month as August, and the casualties as about 120 persons. A letter from China dated November 1803 simply reported that it was believed that Houghton, a country ship, had encountered bad weather and foundered.

The EIC valued the cargo it had lost at £2,603.
