= Princess Royal (East Indiaman) =

Four vessels with the name Princess Royal have served the British East India Company (EIC).

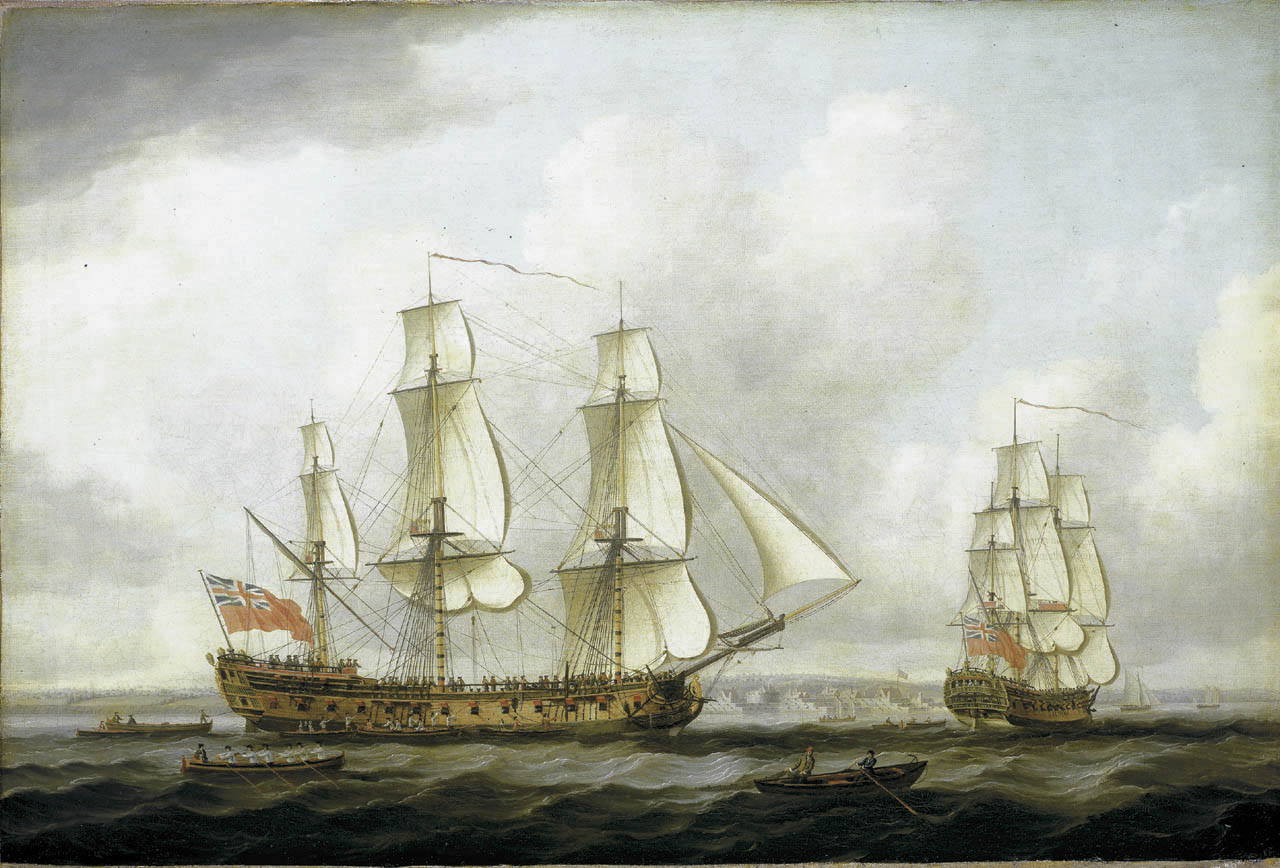
Princess Royal, c. 1770, John Cleveley the Elder, National Maritime Museum, Greewich

- Princess Royal (1733 EIC ship), of 470-90 or 54128/94 tons (bm), was launched on the River Thames in 1733. She made two voyages for the EIC, one to Madras and Bengal, and the other to China, between 1734 and 1739. On 21 November 1739 her owners sold her to the Admiralty, which converted her to a hospital ship. In 1743 the Navy converted her to a storeship, and in 1750 sold her. She was captained by Duncan Backwell and held 94/98 crew.
- Princess Royal (1769 Indiaman), of 87839/94 tons (bm), was launched on 14 November 1769 by Wells, Deptford. The owner of the vessel, Alexander Hume, was on both voyages to China for the East India Trading Company. She made four trips to India, the East Indies, and China for the EIC. She was sold in 1782 for breaking up.
- Princess Royal (1786 EIC ship) was launched in 1786. She made two voyages to India for the EIC. On her third voyage, in 1793, this one to China, the French captured her and used her in the Indian Ocean as the frigate Duguay Tourin. The British recaptured her within a year and she returned to mercantile service. She made one more voyage for the EIC, this one in 1797-98, from Bombay back to England. In 1799 a French privateer captured her and she then disappears from the records.
- Princess Royal (1794 ship) was launched in 1794 and made one voyage for the EIC to Madras and Bengal between 1797 and 1798 as an extra ship.
- Princess Royal was building at Northfleet for the EIC when the Royal Navy purchased her on the stocks and launched her in 1796 as HMS Ardent. She served the navy, taking part in several two major battles; she was broken up at Bermuda in 1824.
