= William Pitt (1785 EIC ship) =

History

Great Britain
- Name: William Pitt
- Owner: Sir Robert Preston
- Operator: British East India Company
- Builder: Perry, Blackwall
- Launched: 16 November 1785
- Fate: Sold for breaking up 1809

General characteristics
- Tons burthen: 798, or 79850/94 (bm)
- Length: Overall: 143 ft 7 1/2 in (43.8 m); Keel: 116 ft 4 1/2 in (35.5 m)
- Beam: 35 ft 11 in (10.9 m)
- Depth of hold: 14 ft 9 1/2 in (4.5 m)
- Complement: 1793:99; 1800:60
- Armament: 1793: 26 × 12-pounder guns; 1800: 20 × 12&6-pounder guns

William Pitt was launched on the River Thames in 1785 as an East Indiaman. She made six voyages for the British East India Company (EIC). During her fourth she served as an ad hoc warship in a naval campaign during which she saw action. Thereafter she served as a transport, including one voyage in 1801-1802 transporting rice from Bengal to Britain. She was sold for breaking up in 1809.

== EIC career ==
1st EIC voyage (1786–1787): Captain Charles Mitchell sailed from the Downs on 26 March, bound for Madras and Bengal. William Pitt reached Madras on 26 July and Diamond Point on 14 August. She arrived at Cox's Island on 13 December. Homeward bound, she sailed from Cox's Island on 2 January 1787, reached St Helena on 13 March, and arrived back at the Downs on 15 May

2nd EIC voyage (1788–1789): Captain Mitchell sailed from the Downs on 5 April 1788, bound for Madras and Bengal. William Pitt reached Madras on 13 July and Diamond Point on 23 July. Homeward bound, she sailed from Saugor on 15 November, reached St Helena on 20 January 1789, and arrived at the Downs on 23 March.

3rd EIC voyage (1790–1791): Captain Mitchell sailed from the Downs on 19 April 1790, bound for Bengal and Madras. William Pitt arrived at Diamond Harbour on 6 August. Homeward bound, she was at Saugor from 2 January 1791 to 6 February. She reached Madras on 14 February and the Cape on 11 April. She reached St Helena on 2 May and arrived back at the Downs on 30 June.

4th EIC voyage (1793–1795): Captain Mitchell acquired a letter of marque on 25 April 1793. He sailed from Portsmouth on 22 May 1793, bound for Madras, Bengal, and Benkulen. William Pitt reached Madras on 18 September and Diamond Point (probably a mis-transcription for Diamond Harbour), on 2 October. She arrived at Saugor on 29 November.

In late 1793 John Shore, the EIC's Governor-General of India, formed a squadron from the company's own ships to patrol the South-Asia region. The EIC diverted two East Indiamen, William Pitt and Britannia, and the country ship Nonsuch for the service. A vessel of the Bombay Marine, possibly Viper, accompanied them. The reason for the move was the coming together of two problems, the inability of the British Royal Navy to maintain a presence in the area, and intelligence concerning the presence of French privateers and naval vessels in the area.

The EIC appointed Captain Mitchell, captain of William Pitt, Commodore of the squadron.

On 21 January 1794 Houghton joined the British squadron. The next day the squadron engaged two French privateers, Vengeur, of 34 guns and 250 men, and Résolue, of 26 guns and 230 men. Britannia captured Vengeur, and Nonsuch captured Résolu, with the French captains realising that further resistance would be pointless as William Pitt and Houghton came up. Eleven French sailors had been killed and 25 wounded on Vengeur; British losses were one killed and two wounded on Britannia. Casualties were high on Résolue, but no numbers are available.

On 24–25 January, the EIC squadron engaged a French naval squadron from Île de France, consisting of the frigates Prudente and Cybèle, the brig Vulcain and the captured East Indiaman Princess Royal, now renamed Duguay-Trouin. The two squadrons engaged at long range though Houghton and Nonsuch managed to hit Cybèle. The French broke off the engagement and the British did not pursue. The need to man the prizes and to guard the prisoners, who outnumbered their captors, had left the British with just enough men to man the guns. Casualties among the French squadron are not known, but the only loss on the British ships was on Nonsuch, which had a man killed in combat with Cybèle. (4) 1792/3 Madras, Bengal and Benkulen. Capt Charles Mitchell.

William Pitt remained in the area for some seven months. She was at Batavia on 26 January and Benkulen on 4 March. She visited "Onreat" (probably Onrust Island) on 26 March, returning to Batavia on 2 June. She then sailed to Malacca, arriving on 16 July, and Penang, arriving there on 13 August. She returned to Diamond Harbour on24 September. Finally home bound, she was at Saugor on 29 November, leaving there on 8 January 1795. She reached St Helena on 18 March and arrived at the Downs on 23 July.

On Mitchell's return to Britain in 1796 King George III knighted him, and presented with £8,000 (the equivalent of £1,161,000 as of 2023) as reward and compensation for his diversion to the Straits.

5th EIC voyage (1796–179): Captain Sir Charles Mitchel sailed from Portsmouth on 12 April 1796, bound for the Cape, Madras, Bengal, and Bombay. William Pitt reached Simon's Bay on 21 July and Madras on 17 November. She arrived at Trincomalee on 19 December, and returned to Madras on 4 January 1797. She arrived at Kedgeree on 1 February. Bound to Bombay, she was at Mahé on 30 April and Calicut on 2 May. She arrived at Bombay on 26 May. Homeward bound, she sailed from Bombay on 9 August, and reached the Cape on 16 October. She was at St Helena on 3 December and arrived home on 31 January 1798.

6th EIC voyage (1799–1800): Captain Sir Charles Mitchell sailed from Portsmouth on 2 April 1799, bound for Madras and Bengal. William Pitt reached Madras on 4 August and Diamond Harbour 30 August. Homeward bound, she was at Saugor on 20 November and sailed on 11 December. She reached Madras on 20 December and Colombo on 30 December. She was at Point de Galle on 6 February 1800. She reached St Helena on 27 April and Cork on 29 June. She arrived back at the Downs on 5 July.

== Later career and fate ==
Rice voyage: Weather-induced crop failures in Britain in 1799 and 1800 forced the British Government to import rice from Bengal to counter popular unrest. The wheat harvests of 1799 and 1800 were about one-half and three-quarters of the average, respectively. The price of bread rose sharply, leading to bread riots; some of rioters invoked the French Revolution. Her owners tendered William Pitt. Captain Richard Owen acquired a letter of marque on 29 November 1800.

William Pitt, Owen, master, returned from Bengal on 27 April 1802.

Between 1802 and 1809 William Pitt was employed as a troopship and a West Indiaman. In 1809 she was sold for breaking up.
