= French ship Vengeur =

Seven ships of the French Navy have borne the name Vengeur ('Avenger'):

== Ships named Vengeur ==
- Vengeur (1765) (1765–1785), a 64-gun ship of the line
- Vengeur (1789) (1790–1792), a Téméraire-class ship of the line
- Vengeur (1794), a 20-gun corvette
- Vengeur (1799) (1799), an 8-gun schooner
- Vengeur (1803) (1803–1806), a 120-gun Océan-class ship of the line
- Vengeur (1872) (1872–1905), an armoured coast guard
- Vengeur, a monitor type ironclad of 1882.
- Vengeur (Q137) (1931–1942), a Redoutable-class submarine, eventually scuttled with the Toulon fleet in 1942

== Ships with similar names ==
- The 74-gun ship of the line Marseillois (or Marseillais) was renamed Vengeur du Peuple ("Avenger of the People) in February 1794, and was often referred to simply as Vengeur – this ship fought, and was sunk, at the Third Battle of Ushant on 1 June 1794.

== See also ==
- French privateer Vengeur
- French ship Vengeance

== Sources and references ==
- Demerliac, Alain (2004). La Marine de la Révolution: Nomenclature des Navires Français de 1792 A 1799 (in French). Éditions Ancre. ISBN 2-906381-24-1.
- Roche, Jean-Michel (2005). Dictionnaire des bâtiments de la flotte de guerre française de Colbert à nos jours, 1671 - 1870. Group Retozel-Maury Millau. ISBN 978-2-9525917-0-6. OCLC 165892922.

This article includes data released under a Creative Commons Attribution-ShareAlike 3.0 Unported UK: England & Wales Licence, by the National Maritime Museum, as part of the Warship Histories project.
