= HMS Resolute =

Several ships of the Royal Navy have borne the name Resolute. Another was planned but never completed:

- HMS Resolute (1805) was a 12-gun gun-brig launched in 1805. She was used as a tender from 1814, a diving bell vessel from 1816 and a convict hulk from 1844. She was broken up in 1852.
- HMS Resolute was to have been a screw frigate. She was ordered in 1847 but cancelled in 1850.
- HMS Resolute (1850) was a discovery vessel, previously the civilian ship Ptarmigan. She was purchased in 1850 as HMS Refuge but renamed HMS Resolute later that year. She was abandoned in the Arctic in 1855, but salvaged by the Americans and returned in 1856. She was broken up in 1879.
- HMS Resolute (1855) was an iron screw storeship purchased on the stocks in 1855 and launched that year. She became a troopship and was renamed HMS Adventure in 1857. She was broken up in 1877.
- Resolute (1907) was a fishing drifter, hired by the Admiralty between 1915 and 1919
- Resolute (1942) was a tug built in the United States under Lend-Lease and returned in 1943 to serve as USS Evea. She was sold to the French Navy as Malabar and sank in 1967.

== See also ==
- HMCS Resolute
- HMS Resolue
- HMS Resolution
