= Agreeable (ship) =

Several vessels have been named Agreeable:

- Agreeable (1793 ship) was launched at Bermuda in 1786, probably under a different name. French owners acquired her at some point and sailed her as Agréable. In 1793 the British captured her. Subsequently, she made six voyages as a slave ship between 1793 and 1808, alternating between slave trading and sailing as a regular West Indiaman. French privateers captured her between the second and third, and the third and fourth, but each time the British Royal Navy recaptured her. In the case of the second capture she was in French hands long enough for them to send her out as a privateer. She herself captured an American vessel in 1808 as she was returning to Liverpool from her last slave voyage. After the end of British participation in the slave trade Agreeable traded more widely, particularly to South America. She was condemned at Buenos Aires in 1814 after running aground in the River Plate. She was repaired and continue to sail to Brazil until she returned to Liverpool in June 1819.
- Agreeable (1798 ship) was launched in 1786 or 1788 in Liverpool, possibly under another name. Between 1798 and 1802 she made three voyages as a slave ship. A French privateer captured her in 1803 as she was sailing from Africa to the West Indies on her fourth slave trading voyage.
