= Evea =

Comanche Native American chief

Evea or Pubea was a prominent Comanche Native American chief of the 18th century.

Evea signed a treaty with the Spanish colonial Governor of Texas, Juan María Vicencio de Ripperdá at San Antonio in June 1772.

While he was still chief, his son led a raid on Bucareli in May 1778. Additional raids by the Comanches, probably under Evea, were partially responsible for forcing the people of Bucareli to move on east of the Trinity to the site of Nacogdoches, where they began to settle before April 30, 1779.

== Legacy ==
The United States Navy tug USS Evea, in commission from 1943 to 1944, was named for Evea.
