= Byam (1800 ship) =

History

Great Britain
- Name: Byam
- Owner: 1800:Various; 1801:Rodie & Co.; 1803:Begg & Co.
- Builder: Padstow, or Oban
- Launched: 1800
- Captured: 1807

General characteristics
- Tons burthen: 166, or 170 (bm)
- Sail plan: Snow
- Complement: 25
- Armament: 14 × 6&9-pounder guns

Byam was a snow launched at Oban, or possibly Padstow, in 1800. She made four voyages as a slave ship in the triangular trade in enslaved people. The French captured and burnt her in late 1807 or early 1808 as she was about to deliver the captives from her fifth voyage.

== Career ==
Byam entered Lloyd's Register in 1800 with J. French, master, Stevenson, owner, and trade Liverpool−Antigua. The next year it reported that her master had changed from J. French to G. Martin, her owner from "Grcocut" to Rodie & Co., and her trade from Liverpool−Antigua to Liverpool–Africa.

1st voyage transporting enslaved people (1801–1802): Captain George Martin sailed from Liverpool on 10 November 1801. In 1800, 133 vessels sailed from British ports, bound to engage in the acquisition and transport of enslaved people; 120 of these vessels sailed from Liverpool.

It is not clear where Byam acquired captives, but she delivered them to Saint Vincent on 16 June 1802. There she landed 199 captives. She sailed from St Vincent on 31 July and arrived back at Liverpool on 15 September. She had left Liverpool with 22 crew members and suffered eight crew deaths on her voyage.

2nd voyage transporting enslaved people (1802–1804): Captain Martin sailed from Liverpool on 16 October 1802. In 1802, 155 vessels sailed from British ports, bound to engage in the acquisition and transport of enslaved people; 122 of these vessels sailed from Liverpool.

Byam acquired captives at Rio Pongo. She left Africa on 14 May 1803, and arrived at Barbados on 24 June 1803. Captain Martin died there and Captain James Seddon replaced him. (Note: James Seddon had previously made four voyages as captain of Agreeable, until a French privateer had captured her earlier that year and taken her into Guadeloupe. Seddon was one of the leading captains of slave ships. Between 1796 he made nine voyages as a captain, sailing six different vessels for two different owners. He died on 8 October 1806, on his ninth voyage while captain of Trafalgar.) Byam sailed on to Demerara. She had embarked 205 or 208 captives, and she landed 193, for a mortality rate of 6%. She sailed from Demerara on 14 November and arrived at Liverpool on 24 January 1804. She had left Liverpool with 24 crew members and suffered eight crew deaths on her voyage.

3rd voyage transporting enslaved people (1804–1805): Captain John Bradley sailed from Liverpool on 18 July 1804. In 1800, 147 vessels sailed from British ports, bound to engage in the acquisition and transport of enslaved people; 1126 of these vessels sailed from Liverpool.

Byam delivered the captives she had gathered to Suriname, where she arrived 7 November. There she landed 204. She left Suriname on 27 January 1805 and arrived back at Liverpool on 29 March. She had left Liverpool with 23 crew members and she suffered 13 crew deaths on the voyage.

4th voyage transporting enslaved people (1805–1806): Captain John Bradley acquired a letter of marque on 13 July 1805. He sailed from Liverpool on 3 August 1805. Lloyd's List (LL) reported on 11 February 1806, that Byam, Bradley, master, had arrived at the Congo. She had grounded at Shark's Point but had been gotten off. Her crew had to throw eight of her guns overboard, and unload her ammunition and provisions to lighten her. Byam acquired captives at the Congo River and arrived at Dutch Guiana on 20 March 1606. There she landed 25 captives. Byam had rescued the master, crew, and 25 captives from Jane, which had blown up while at the Congo, perhaps as the result of a rebellion among the enslaved people on her. (Note: The Trans Atlantic Slave Trade database reports that almost the entire crew and all the captives were killed. However, the report in Lloyd's List directly contradicts this.)

Byam then sailed to Demerara, where she landed 168 captives. She sailed for home on 22 May and arrived back at Liverpool on 11 July. She had left Liverpool with 31 crew members and suffered two crew deaths on the voyage.

== Fate ==
Captain Alexander Williams sailed Byam from Liverpool on 6 January 1807 on what was to have been her fifth voyage transporting enslaved people. She acquired captives at the Rio Pongo, and while there apparently suffered from a mass desertion of her crew. She eventually sailed with a cargo of captives but was unable to deliver them.

Lloyd's List reported on 12 April 1808 that Byam had been taken. Her captors had driven her ashore at Guadeloupe and burnt her.

During the period 1793 to 1807, war, rather than maritime hazards or resistance by the captives, was the greatest cause of vessel losses among British vessels in the triangular trade.
