= Patna (1778 ship) =

History

Great Britain
- Name: Patna
- Namesake: Patna
- Owner: EIC
- Builder: Java
- Launched: 1778
- Fate: Sold 1796

General characteristics
- Type: Sloop
- Tons burthen: 108 (bm)
- Propulsion: Sail
- Armament: 2 × 12-pounder + 12 × 2-pounder guns

Patna was a sloop built at Java in 1778 that served the British East India Company (EIC) as a pilot boat of the Bengal Pilot Service.

In 1782 she served as a tender to Nonsuch on Nonsuch's voyage carrying opium to China. Lieutenant Colonel Henry Watson, who owned Nonsuch, prevailed upon the EIC, which was sponsoring the venture, to provide guns for Patna.

Watson's orders to Captain Richardson of Nonsuch were that Patna was to accompany Richardson to Canton. Richardson was to sail directly to China, avoiding the Malacca and Sunda Straits, passing east of Java, and then proceeding past the Philippines to China. Instead, Richardson sailed via the Malacca Straits, spent a month around Java, where he sold numerous chests of opium on private account. He then put the proceeds on Patna and sent her back to Bengal.

In 1793 the EIC converted Patna to a buoy vessel. On 27 July 1796 Patna was condemned and sold.
