= French ship Vengeance =

Several ships of the French Navy have borne the name Vengeance:

- French frigate Vengeance (1757), a 24-gun frigate
- French brig Vengeance (1779), a 12-gun frigate
- French corvette Vengeance (1794), a 24-gun corvette, renamed Vénus in 1795
- French frigate Vengeance (1795), a 48-gun frigate, and lead ship of her class
- French xebec Vengeance (1757), a xebec and former privateer
- French frigate Vengeance (1848), 56-gun first-rate frigate

== See also ==
- French ship Vengeur

== Sources and references ==
- Roche, Jean-Michel (2005). Dictionnaire des bâtiments de la Flotte de guerre française de Colbert à nos jours. Vol. 1. Group Retozel-Maury Millau. ISBN 978-2-9525917-0-6. OCLC 165892922.
