= Belvedere (1787 EIC ship) =

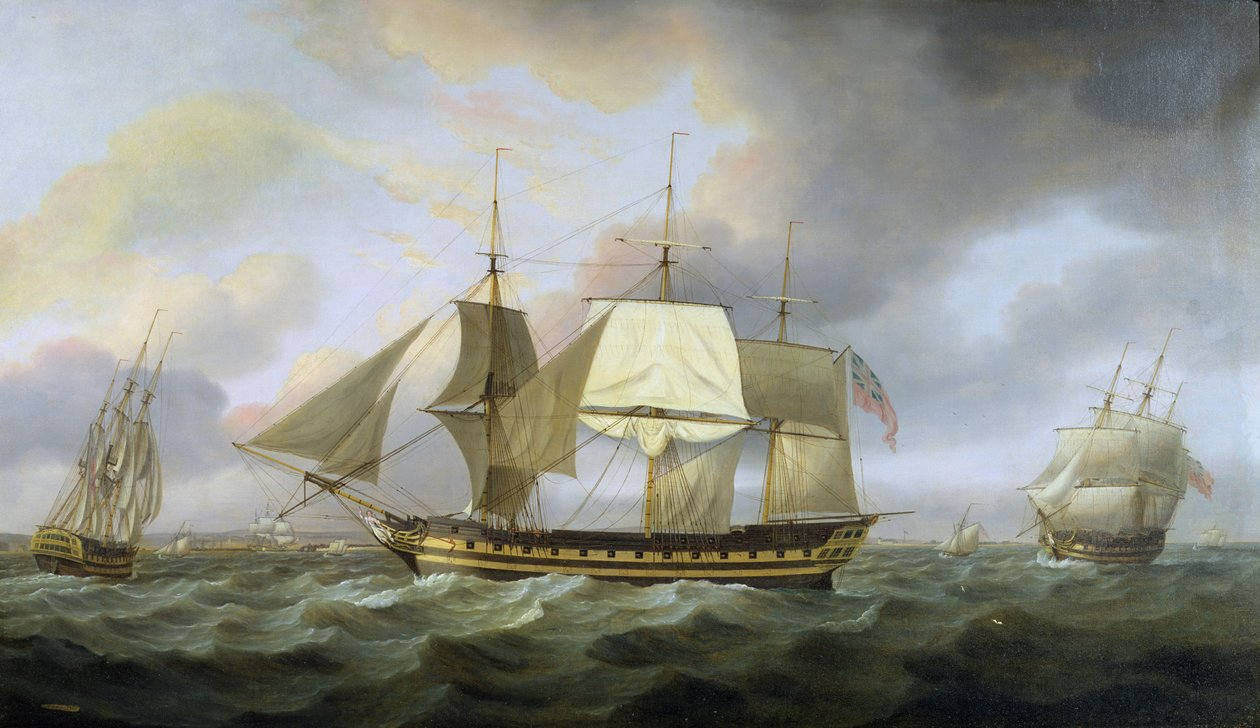
- Belvedere, Captain Charles Christie Commander, 1800; Thomas Luny

History

British East India Company
- Name: Belvedere
- Owner: EIC voyage #11:1 Edward Fiott; EIC voyage #2: John Fiott; EIC voyages #3-6: Samuel Bonham.
- Builder: Crookenden & Taylor, Itchenor, Chichester
- Launched: 18 April 1787
- Fate: Broken up

General characteristics
- Tons burthen: 929, or 98782/94, or 988, or 999, or 1000 (bm)
- Length: Overall: 151 ft 9 1/2 in (46.3 m); Keel: 122 ft 1 3/4 in (37.2 m)
- Beam: 39 ft 0 in (11.9 m)
- Depth of hold: 16 ft 0 in (4.9 m)
- Complement: 1793:118; 1797:118; 1801:118
- Armament: 1793:26 × 9-pounder guns; 1797:26 × 12&9-pounder guns; 1801:26 × 12&9-pounder guns

Belvedere was launched in 1787 at Itchenor. She made six voyages for the British East India Company (EIC). She then briefly sailed as a West Indiaman. She was broken up by 1805.

== 1st EIC voyage (1787–1788) ==
Captain William Greer sailed from Portsmouth on 9 June 1787, bound for China. Belvedere arrived at Whampoa Anchorage on 6 November.

On 2 December Greer had a seaman put into chains. A few days later some 10 crewmen mutinied and threw their officers overboard. No one drowned. Captain James Dundas of Earl Fitzwilliam, the senior EIC captain at Canton, gathered men from the other Indiamen there, suppressed the mutiny, and incarcerated the mutineers on Fitzwilliam. A court of 16 EIC captains tried the mutineers on 15 December. Two were sentenced to 180 lashes around the fleet; the others were subject to a smaller number of lashes aboard Belvedere.

Homeward bound, Belvedere crossed the Second Bar on 14 February 1788. She reached St Helena on 20 July, and arrived back at Long Reach on 25 September.

== 2nd EIC voyage (1790–1791) ==
Captain Greer sailed from Portsmouth on 20 February 1790, bound for Madras and China. Belvedere was at Johanna on 3 June and reached Madras on 28 June. She then stopped at Penang on 15 August before arriving at Whampoa on 7 October. Homeward bound, she was at Macao on 16 Mar ch 1791, reached St Helena on 6 July, and arrived at Long Reach on 23 September.

== 3rd EIC voyage (1793–1794) ==
The French Revolutionary Wars had begun a few months before Belvedere again sailed for the Far East. Captain Charles Christie acquired a letter of marque on 7 June 1793. He sailed from Portsmouth on 7 July, bound for Bombay. Belvedere was at Colombo on 25 November, Tellichery on 3 December, and Calicut on 17 December; she arrived at Bombay on 5 January 1794. Homeward bound, she was at Tellicherry on 15 March, Calicut on 31 March, and Quilon on 10 April. She reached St Helena on 26 June and arrived at Long Reach on 10 September.

== 4th EIC voyage (1795–1797) ==
Captain Christie sailed from Portsmouth on 9 July, bound for St Helena and China. In September she spoke the whaler London near Rio de Janeiro; the whaler was on her way to Peru. Belvedere reached St Helena on 30 September and the Cape of Good Hope on 21 November; she arrived at whampoa on 28 March 1796. Homeward bound, she crossed the Second Bar on 9 May, and was at Macao on 29 June. She reached St Helena on 20 June and arrived at Gravesend on 13 February 1797.

== 5th EIC voyage (1797–1800) ==
Captain Charles Christie acquired a letter of marque on 28 June 1797. The Belvedere had lost its rudder in Torbay, On Saturday 16 September 1797, whilst under tow of HMS Marlborough (Capt. Ellison) from Torbay to Portsmouth, the ships were caught in a severe gale, off Portland and the tow rope broke, leaving the Belvedere at the mercy of the sea on a Lee shore. In an act of great courage and outstanding seamanship, the Marlborough came down to the Belvedere, and managed to get a new Bower cable from the Belvedere to the Marlborough, and then towed her away from danger. He sailed from Portsmouth on 6 November 1797, bound for Bombay. She was at Madeira on 22 November and the Cape on 3 February 1798; she arrived at Bombay on 29 May. She then sailed to Cannanore, where she arrived on 18 September. She sailed on to Colombo, where she arrived on 17 October, before she sailed back to Cannanore. She arrived back at Cannanore on 5 November and Bombay on 22 November. In January 1799 she cruised between Cannanore and Mangalore. She returned to Bombay on 8 February. Homeward bound, she reached St Helena on 4 September and Cork on 12 January 1800. She arrived back at the Downs.

== 6th EIC voyage (1801–1802) ==
Captain James Peter Fearon acquired a letter of marque on 10 March 1801. He sailed from Portsmouth on 19 May 1801, bound for China. She was at Rio de Janeiro on 31 July and Penang on 1 November. She arrived at Whampoa on 30 January 1802. Homeward bound, she crossed the Second Bar on 20 March, reached st Helena on 8 July, and arrived back at Gravesend on 16 September. (Note: Fearon was the child of actors and on his return to London he played some Shakespearean roles, but to mixed reviews. He was declared bankrupt in 1803. In 1807 he went out to India to find work as a captain. He died at sea in 1821)

== West Indiaman ==
Belvedere may briefly have become a West Indiaman. However, that is not reflected in the ship arrival and departure data in Lloyd's List.

== Fate ==
Belvedere's registration was cancelled on 29 August 1805. Her demolition had been completed.
