= HMS Saint Lucia =

Brig of the Royal Navy

History

United States
- Launched: 1790
- Fate: Sold 1796

France
- Name: Enfant Prodigue
- Acquired: 1796 by purchase at Bordeaux
- Captured: 24 June 1803

United Kingdom
- Name: HMS Saint Lucia
- Acquired: 24 June 1803 (by capture)
- Captured: 29 March 1807

General characteristics
- Type: French service: schooner; British service: brig-sloop
- Displacement: 120 tons (French)
- Tons burthen: 183 bm
- Length: c.85 ft 6 in (26.1 m) (overall); c.65 ft 0 in (19.8 m) (keel)
- Beam: c.23 ft 0 in (7.0 m)
- Propulsion: Sails
- Sail plan: Brig
- Complement: 59 (French service)
- Armament: Enfant Prodigue: 12 × 4-pounder guns; 16 × 4-pounder guns (1803); Santa Lucia: 14 cannons, almost all carronades

HMS Saint Lucia was a brig-sloop, the former French Navy schooner Enfant Prodigue, which the British captured in 1803 and took into service with the Royal Navy. Under the British flag she captured three small French privateers and several prizes in the Leeward Islands before two French privateers recaptured her in 1807.

== French Navy schooner ==
Enfant Prodigue was a schooner, built in America in 1790 and coppered in December 1790 at Lorient. The French Navy purchased her at Bordeaux in 1796. The French Navy commissioned her as an aviso under Lieutenant Pierre Guiyesse. From 1 February 1798 to 7 March 1798, she ferried passengers from Cap-Français to A Coruña, and later from Ferrol to Lorient. In 1799 she captured the British schooner HMS Charlotte in a fight that resulted in Charlotte having one man wounded.

== Capture ==
On 24 June 1803, Emerald captured Enfant Prodigue between St Lucia and Martinique after a chase of 72 hours. Captain James O'Bryen of Emerald reported that Enfant Prodigue was pierced for 16 guns but during the chase had thrown all of her guns, however many she actually mounted, overboard. Head money was paid 25 years later.

The British took Enfant Prodigue into service as the brig-sloop HMS Saint Lucia, of 14 guns. She was commissioned in August under Commander Conway Shipley.

== British warship ==
On 16 August 1803, Saint Lucia captured the French privateer Sally. Sally was armed with six guns and had a crew of 28 men. (Note: A first-class share of the head money (a bounty for the number of prisoners taken) was worth £35 11s 6¾d; a fifth-class share, that of a seaman, was worth 8s 8¾d. By the time of the payment in 1827, Conway Shipley was already dead.)

In August–September Saint Lucia captured three prizes:

- French sloop Eliza (1 August), carrying mahogany and mill timber;
- brig Lucretia (16 September), carrying sugar; and,
- schooner Diana (27 September), carrying coffee and sugar.

Around November, Saint Lucia recaptured the brig Earl St. Vincent, which had been sailing from Dublin to Barbados, and a Swedish schooner. The French privateer Harmonie, of Martinique, had captured them three days earlier. Saint Lucia was unable to capture the privateer which escaped by throwing her guns overboard and sawing down her gunwales.

On 25 January 1804, Saint Lucia captured the French privateers Furet and Bijou. Furet was out of Guadeloupe. She was armed with four guns and had a crew of 45 men. Bijou, which Saint Lucia captured off Grenada, was armed with six guns, and had a crew of 60 men, twenty of whom she had put on two prizes. The two prizes were the brig Good Intent, which had been sailing from Barbados to Demerara, and which Guachapin had since retaken, and the schooner Fancy, which had been sailing from Demerara to Barbados.

In May Commander Robert Reynolds replaced Shipley, who transferred to Hippomenes, and in November Commander James Ayscough replaced Reynolds. Commander Charles Gordon replaced Ayscough in 1806.

== Fate ==
On 20 March 1807 the French privateers Vengeance (12 guns) and Friponne (5 guns) captured Saint Lucia off Guadeloupe. Before she struck her colours, Saint Lucia had suffered seven men dead and eight wounded. Gordon had initiated the action but his first broadside disabled three of his cannonades when the recoil pulled their breaching bolts out of the timbers. The fourth broadside similarly disabled a fourth cannonade. He turned to use his other broadside, but lost two more cannonades when their recoil caved in the bulwarks. Saint Lucia fought on for two more hours but then surrendered when the French approached with the intention of boarding her. (Note: A number of sources give the name of the commander of Saint Lucia as Michael De Courcy, but the court-martial records confirm that her commander was Gordon.) Her subsequent fate is unknown.
