= Nonsuch (1781 ship) =

India-built British merchant ship 1781–1802

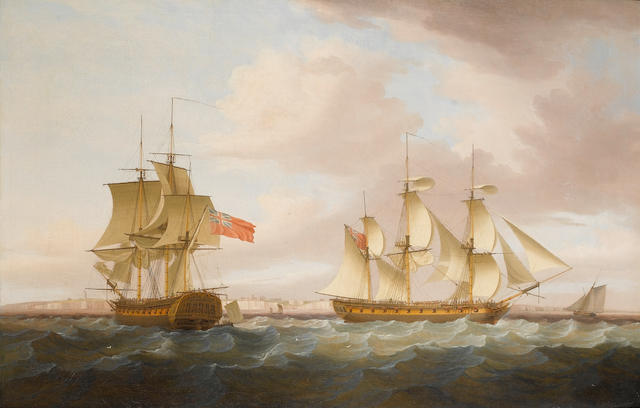
- The Calcutta-trade merchantman Nonsuch in two positions off the Kingsgate Gap, Thomas Whitcombe

History

Great Britain
- Name: Nonsuch
- Owner: Henry Watson; John Canning
- Builder: Colonel Henry Watson, Kidderpore
- Launched: 1781
- Fate: Broken up in 1802

General characteristics
- Tons burthen: 400, or 450, or 483 (bm)
- Propulsion: Sail
- Armament: 1782: 36 × light 12-pounder guns; 1794:4 × long brass 18-pounder + 18 × long iron 9-pounder + 10 × long iron 6-pounder guns + 2 × long iron 12-pounder chase guns; 1796:8 × 4&6-pounder guns

Nonsuch was launched at Calcutta in 1781, as the first large vessel built there. She was designed to serve as either a merchantman or a man-of-war. She spent the first 12 years of her career as a merchant vessel, carrying opium to China amongst other cargoes. After the outbreak of the French Revolutionary Wars in 1793, her owner frequently hired her out as an armed ship to the British East India Company (EIC). She participated in an engagement with a French naval squadron and recaptured an East Indiaman. She also made two voyages for the EIC. After the Peace of Amiens in 1802, the EIC paid her off; as she was being hauled into a dockyard for repairs she was damaged and the decision was taken to break her up.

== Origins ==
Lieutenant colonel Henry Watson built Nonsuch in 1781, at the shipyard he had constructed at Kidderpore. Watson was chief engineer under Warren Hastings' government. Hastings was the first Governor of the Presidency of Fort William (Bengal).

Nonsuch was the first regular Calcutta-built ship and her sequence number in the General Registry there was "1". She was built to be able to function either as a merchantman or a cruiser.

Watson proposed to Hastings that the EIC start trading opium to China, and offered Nonsuch for the purpose. China prohibited the opium trade and the intent was to circumvent the Chinese authorities.

Watson also convinced Hastings to provide the armament for Nonsuch, and soldiers to act as marines. Watson requested that the EIC provide him with thirty-six light 12-pounder guns, perhaps by drawing on the guns at Fort St George (Madras), or Fort William (Kidderpore). Apparently he received the guns, some especially cast for him and some transferred from Madras. Nonsuch had 56 soldiers: 30 sepoys from an EIC battalion, and 26 men from the "Supernumerary Company".

== Career ==
=== First opium-trading voyage ===
Watson undertook to carry 2,000 chests of opium for the EIC at a freight of sicca rupees 50/chest, plus 250 chests on his own account. As it turned out, Nonsuch carried 1601 chests for the EIC, plus Watson's 250. She also carried lead, "elephants teeth" (ivory), and some gold.

Watson's orders to Captain William Richardson of Nonsuch were that the sloop Patna was to accompany Richardson to Canton as a ship's tender. Richardson was to sail directly to China, avoiding the Malacca and Sunda Straits, passing east of Java, and then proceeding past the Philippines to China. Instead, Richardson sailed via the Malacca Straits and then spent a month around Java, where he sold numerous chests of opium on private account. He put the proceeds on Patna and sent her back to Bengal.

Nonsuch arrived at Macao on 21 July. Thereafter reports differ as to the profitability of the voyage. The EIC's supercargoes claimed that they had sold the 1601 chests of opium at Spanish dollars 210/chest, most of it for re-export from Macao to Malaya, with a resulting loss to the company of Spanish dollars 69,973. Richardson countered that the opium had sold for Spanish dollars 350/chest, for a gain to the company of Spanish dollars 195,722. In either case, the Court of Directors of the EIC forbade further trade in opium to China on the grounds that "it was beneath the Company to engage in such a clandestine trade".

=== Subsequent voyages ===
Nonsuch continued to trade with China, and in opium, but now on private account not the EIC's.

On 19 August 1788, Lloyd's List reported that on 12 March, Nonsuch, Canning, master, had cleared her pilot and was bound from Bengal to China, "all well".

=== Vansittart salvage operations ===
The East Indiaman Vansittart wrecked on 23 August 1789, in Gaspar Strait on the coast of Banca Island, East Indies, on her passage to Canton. All but one of her crew of 115 men survived the wrecking, though the boatswain and five men were lost in her gig after the survivors took to the boats. On 26 August, the survivors reached Nonsuch, Captain Canning, and another country ship, General Elliot, Captain Lloyd. Vansitart was carrying chests of dollars worth £45,000 for the EIC, and £11,000 of private treasure. Captains Canning and Lloyd agreed with Captain Wilson of Vansittart to attempt the salvage of the treasure in return for one-third of what they were able to recover. Nonsuch and General Elliot sailed on 30 August, to the site of the loss. There they were able to recover 40 chests, worth about £40,000. Some of the survivors then sailed Vansittart's cutter to Penang, while others, including Wilson, went on to Canton in Nonsuch, or Batavia in General Elliot.

Nonsuch was among the country ships (British ships sailing between India and China) reported at Canton in 1789.

In 1790, Canning made a voyage to Canton with opium, the quality of which was not good. Consequently, he lost money on the voyage. He sued the EIC, but his suit failed. Still, the EIC reportedly appointed him Master Attendant at Calcutta as a remuneration.

=== Sunda Strait ===
In late 1793, John Shore, the EIC's Governor-General of India, formed a squadron from the company's own ships to patrol the region. He diverted two East Indiamen, William Pitt and Britannia, and Nonsuch from their regular route for the service. A vessel of the Bombay Marine, possibly Viper, accompanied them. The reason for the move was the coming together of two problems, the inability of the British Royal Navy to maintain a presence in the area, and intelligence concerning the presence of French privateers and naval vessels in the area.

The EIC appointed Charles Mitchell, captain of William Pitt, Commodore of the squadron. On 21 January 1794, Houghton joined the squadron. The next day the squadron engaged two French privateers, Vengeur, of 34 guns and 250 men, and Résolue, of 26 guns and 230 men. Britannia captured Vengeur, and Nonsuch captured Résolue, with the French captains realising that further resistance would be pointless as William Pitt and Houghton came up. Eleven French sailors had been killed and 25 wounded; losses on Résolue were heavy. British losses were one killed and two wounded on Britannia.

On 24–25 January, the EIC squadron engaged a French naval squadron from Île de France, consisting of the frigates Prudente and Cybèle, the brig Vulcain, and the captured East Indiaman Princess Royal, now renamed Duguay-Trouin. The two squadrons engaged at long range though Houghton and Nonsuch managed to hit Cybèle. The French broke off the engagement and the British did not pursue. Casualties among the French squadron are not known, but the only loss on the British ships was on Nonsuch, which had a man killed in combat with Cybèle.

=== EIC voyage (1795–1796) ===
Captain Robert Duffin sailed Nonsuch from Calcutta to England. She was carrying rice on behalf of the British government, which was importing grain to address high prices for wheat in Britain following a poor harvest.

Nonsuch left Diamond Harbour on 21 December 1795, reached St Helena on 17 February 1796, and arrived at the Downs on 18 April. Nonsuch was admitted to the Registry of Great Britain on 8 August 1795. She first appeared in Lloyd's Register in 1796. Her captain was R. Duffin, her owner was Canning, and her trade was London—India.

This information continued unchanged until she was last listed in 1804. However, this obscures at least one notable incident, and other service.

=== The Nonsuch affair ===
In August 1797, Captain Thomas, of Nonsuch, seized the merchant vessel Arminde, Barizy, master, off Penang (equally Pedir Roads, i.e., the north coast of Sumatra). Captain Barizy was a Frenchman, and Armida and her cargo was sold as a prize on the grounds that she was carrying enemy goods. However, the vessel was travelling on behalf of the King of Cochin China and carrying a cargo of sugar consigned to the King's agents, the Danish firm of Harrop and Stevenson of Tranquebar, then a Danish colony. The King made a number of inquiries and eventually the EIC returned Armide to Saigon and agreed to compensate the King for the loss of his cargo, though it is not clear that it actually did pay the compensation.

Earlier, Thomas had also intervened in a dispute between Captain Piercy, captain of a country ship, who claimed that the Rajah of Tellasmoy owed Piercy money. The Court of Directors found Thomas's behavior "irregular, unjustifiable and highly culpable".

Lastly, Thomas had disobeyed instructions to bring Nonsuch back to Bengal by a certain date. The Court stated that it believed that had he followed his instructions he would have been able to prevent a French privateer from capturing the EIC's pilot schooners Harriet and Harrington in Balasore Roads. (Note: The two captured schooners were Harrington and Trial.)

The Court of Directors therefore in November 1797, removed him from command of Nonsuch. In his place they appointed Captain Grey, a lieutenant in His Majesty's navy who formerly commanded the marines at Prince of Wales Island (Penang).

=== Recapture of Osterley ===
On 24 February 1799, the French frigate Forte captured the East Indiaman Osterley in the Bay of Bengal after a sharp action of about 45 minutes in which Osterley sustained casualties of four men killed and 13 wounded before she struck. She had also sustained substantial damage. After removing the stores, the French on 27 February, permitted Osterley to proceed as a cartel for an exchange of prisoners.

Osterley almost immediately encountered Nonsuch, which had been observing Forte and her prize for an opportunity to recapture Osterley. Captain Grey, of Nonsuch, examined the papers of M. La Forée, the French officer accompanying Osterley. Nonsuch then escorted her to Saugor Roads, where Osterley anchored on 1 March.

In April and May 1799, the Court received letters from the Marine Board criticizing Captain Gray's conduct. The Court relieved Gray of command and on 6 May, appointed Captain John Canning, the Deputy Master Attendant, to temporary command of Nonsuch.

When Earl Fitzwilliam caught fire in the Hooghli River, Nonsuch sent a boat, but the boat would not approach closer than 600 ft (183 m) to Earl Fitzwilliam. A boat from Thetis came within an oar's length of Earl Fitzwilliam and hauled in as many crew members as it could. A midshipman from Thetis, with two sailors, rowed back and forth between the wreck and the larger boats that were standing off, and kept up his shuttle service until all the men still on board were rescued.

=== Pursuit of Confiance ===
On 7 October 1800, Captain Robert Surcouf in Confiance captured the East Indiaman Kent. Canning and Nonsuch set out on 18 October, from Saugar Roads in pursuit. On 23 October, Nonsuch encountered Confiance at 16°46′N 85°56′E and commenced a running fight. The EIC's frigate Bombay came up the next day and joined the pursuit, but eventually Confiance escaped in the night after having cut away her anchors and thrown overboard all but her stern chase guns. Nonsuch suffered no casualties in the exchange of fire. She then searched for Kent until 28 October, before returning to Saugur.

In 1801, Nonsuch served in the Bengal squadron, again for the protection of trade. Then on 30 August 1802, the Court of Directors announced that "the Company's frigate Nonsuch", had been discharged in Bengal and the crew paid off in consequence of the peace.

== Fate ==
The New Oriental Register... for 1802 showed Nonsuch as being in the EIC's employ with John Canning, master.

When Nonsuch was being hauled into dock in December 1802 at Sulkea (opposite Calcutta), an accident occurred. She was so damaged that the decision was made to condemn her rather repair her; she was subsequently broken up.
