= Princess Royal (1786 EIC ship) =

History

East India Company
- Name: Princess Royal
- Owner: Alexander Hume
- Builder: Wells
- Launched: October 1786
- Fate: Captured 1793

France
- Name: Duguay Trouin
- Namesake: René Duguay-Trouin
- Owner: Pitot & Co of Mauritius
- Acquired: By capture September 1793 and purchase
- Captured: May 1794

United Kingdom
- Name: Princess Royal
- Acquired: By capture and purchase 1794
- Fate: Captured October 1799

General characteristics
- Type: East Indiaman
- Tons burthen: 80548/94 (bm)
- Length: 143 ft 7 1/2 in (43.8 m) (overall); 116 ft 0 1/2 in (35.4 m) (keel)
- Beam: 36 ft 1 1/2 in (11.0 m)
- Depth of hold: 14 ft 9 in (4.5 m)
- Complement: 1794: 403 men; 1793:99; Duguay Trouin: 403; 1798:95
- Armament: 1793: 26 × 9- & 4-pounder guns; Duguay Trouin: 26 × 12-pounder + 2 × 9-pounder + 4 × 6-pounder guns (Note: Captain Newcome of HMS Orpheus, see text, reported that Duguay Truin carried twenty-six 18-pounder guns. James believed that her main guns were 12-pounders, arguing that that was what she carried as an East Indiaman, and that her gunports were not fitted for 18-pounders. Demerliac gives twenty-six 12-pounders, two 9-pounders and six 4-pounders.); 1798: 12 × 9-pounder guns

Princess Royal, launched in 1786, was an East Indiaman. She made two complete trips to India for the British East India Company (EIC) and was on her third trip, this one to China, when French privateers or warships captured her on 27 September 1793. The French Navy took her into service in the Indian Ocean as a 34-gun frigate under the name Duguay Trouin. The Royal Navy recaptured her and she returned to British merchant service. In 1797 she performed one more voyage for the EIC. She received a letter of marque in July 1798 but was captured in October 1799 off the coast of Sumatra.

== EIC ==
Captain James Horncastle commanded Princess Royal on all three of her voyages, including her last.

=== EIC voyage #1 (1787-88) ===
Horncastle left the Downs on 6 January 1787, bound for Madras, Bengal, and Bombay. Capt James Horncastle. Princess Royal reached the Cape on 3 April, and arrived at Madras on 6 June. From there she sailed to Calcutta, arriving at Diamond Harbour on 18 June. For her return trip, she passed Saugor on 16 November, and reached Bombay on 12 February 1788. She reached St Helena on 12 June and arrived at the Downs on 22 August. During this voyage Horncastle and Princess Royal reportedly fought an action in the Straits of Malacca, though it is not clear against whom.

=== EIC voyage #2 (1790-91) ===
Horncastle left the Downs on 26 April 1790, bound for Bombay. Princess Royal reached Johanna on 12 August and arrived at Bombay on 3 September. From there she sailed to Tellicherry, which she reached on 7 October, Anjengo (27 October), and Tellicherry again (14 November), before returning to Bombay on 30 November. For her return trip she reached Tellicherry on 7 January 1791, the Cape on 3 March, and St Helena on 22 March. She arrived at the Downs on 13 May.

=== EIC voyage #3 and capture (1793-capture) ===
Horncastle left the Downs on 5 April 1793, bound for St Helena and China. The French Revolutionary Wars had begun two months earlier so Horncastle received a letter of marque dated 28 February 1793. This would permit him to engage in offensive action against the French should the opportunity present itself. Princess Royal reached St Helena on 11 July. Unfortunately, on 29 September three French warships captured her off Anger (or Anjere) Point while she was still on her way to China.

H. Couperus, the Dutch governor of Malacca, wrote a letter on 15 December 1793 to the English captains there that a letter from Batavia dated 29 September reported that three French warships had attacked and captured Princess Royal. The letter further reported that the French ships mounted about 120 guns between them. Captain Bampton, of Hormazeer, arrived with a cargo of sugar from Batavia that he picked up after delivering a cargo to Botany Bay. He reported that he had seen three French ships at Batavia, two of 50 guns and one of 44 guns. Another report, this by Captain Simpson of Carron, stated that three French warships were cruising off the coast of Canton. He described them as a 64-gun, a 44-gun, and a 20-gun vessel; they had a large number of troops aboard and were believed responsible for Princess Royal's capture.

A later account reports that the three privateers were the 36-gun Dumouriez, 32-gun La Liberté, and 28-gun Égalité. Horncastle fought for an hour before striking. Princess Royal had two men killed and three wounded.

Her captors took Princess Royal to Île de France. There she was sold; reportedly, "Prize-taking has become so lucrative on Mauritius that bidding for the fast-sailing Princess Royal was fierce and she sold for 2,400,000 livres." (Note: Even if the currency was the French colonial livre (1.5Fcl/1French livre), this is quite a sum, especially as the EIC reported the value of its cargo on board Princess Royal as only £1,800.) Lloyd's List reported that she was in Mauritius being fitted out as a privateer. The French Navy requisitioned her and renamed her Duguay Trouin.

== French naval service ==
On 25 January 1794, Duguay Trouin, under the command of Julien Thérouart, was in the Sunda Strait as part of a French naval squadron from Île de France, that also included the frigates Prudente and Cybèle, and the brig Vulcain, all four vessels under the overall command of Captain Jean-Marie Renaud. There they engaged a squadron of EIC ships consisting of the East Indiamen William Pitt, Houghton, and Britannia, the country ship Nonsuch, the Bombay Marine (EIC) 14-gun brig Nautilus, and two recently captured French privateers, all under the overall command of Commodore Charles Mitchell. (The two privateers were the corvettes Vengeur and Résolue. On 17 January they had attacked the EIC factory at Bencoolen, where the East Indiaman Pigot had repelled them. Mitchell's squadron encountered the two on 22 January and captured them.)

For an hour the two squadrons continued a general exchange of fire at long-range, before Mitchell turned William Pitt, Houghton and Nonsuch towards the French at 09:30, the latter two both managing to hit Cybèle with destructive broadsides. Firing continued for another 18 minutes as Renaud withdrew, eventually anchoring off the island of Pulau Baby. Neither commander was keen to continue the action, Mitchell fearing that his undermanned ships would not be able to properly engage the better armed French vessels. Casualties among the French squadron are not known, but the only loss on the British ships was on Nonsuch, which had a man killed in combat with Cybèle.

In need of reinforcement and resupply, Mitchell drew his squadron back to Batavia and was there joined by the 36 gun Dutch frigate Amazone under Captain Kerwal and an armed merchant ship. Mitchell's ships then cruised the Sunda Strait for another two weeks without discovering any enemy vessels, before concluding the operation on 8 February and returning to the Indian Ocean via Bencoolen.

Renaud used Mitchell's retreat to withdraw also into the Indian Ocean via Bencoolen. His squadron reached the British trading post on 9 February, where Pigot was still undergoing repairs. The French vessels' arrival took Pigot by surprise and they captured her. As the merchant ship was manoeuvred out of the bay, Renaud demanded the surrender of the small Fort Marlborough nearby and was informed that the fort was well armed and that the arrival of Mitchell's squadron was expected at any moment. Unwilling to reengage with Mitchell, Renaud withdrew immediately without assaulting the fort. The French squadron subsequently returned to Île de France.

== Recapture ==
HMS Orpheus, Captain Newcome, captured Duguay Trouin on 5 May 1794. In the action, Orpheus had a midshipman killed, and nine men wounded. French casualties amounted to 21 men killed and 60 wounded. Many of the French crew were ill and Newcome believed that they would not survive the voyage to Madras. Instead, he sailed to Mahé, Seychelles, where he arrived on 16 May. It was a French possession but it made no resistance when he arrived.

Newcome landed 200 sick and wounded prisoners, as well as the rest of Dugay Trouin's crew on Ste. Anne Island, from where a brig later carried them to at Port-Louis, Mauritius. Newcome wrote to Malartic, the governor of Mauritius, asking him to release British prisoners equal in number and rank to those Newcome had landed.

While it was in the Seychelles, the British squadron also captured the brig Olivette, which belonged to the French privateer Jean-François Hodoul, and Deux Andrés, a slaver from Mozambique under the command of Captain Hardy, with 408 slaves on board. On 20 May Newcome sent Olivette to Praslin to gather supplies for the squadron,

Newcome left Mahé on 1 June and arrived at Madras on 18 June, together with Duguay Trouin and Deux Andrés.

== Merchantman and capture ==
On 2 August 1794, it was announced that friends of Captain Reid, of Madras, had purchased Duguay Trouin and appointed him her captain. Duguay Trouin sold for £2900. Her purchasers renamed her Catherine and employed her in the coastal trade. John Reid had left Princess Royal by 4 May 1797. (He shipped on board the country ship Pearl for Bussora and may have died later that year.)

She made one more voyage for the EIC. At some point Catherine reverted to the name Princess Royal. (Note: Hackman implies that the name change occurred after Catherine returned to Bombay from England. However he appears to have mixed up the name of the captains on Princess Royal of 805 tons (bm), and on Princess Royal of 405 tons (bm). Registers of Letters of marque and entries in Lloyd's Register provide the evidence for the occurrence of a mix-up.) It is most likely that the name reversion occurred before she left for England.

Captain John Wedgborough (or Wedgebrough) left Bombay on 9 August 1797. Princess Royal reached the Cape on 16 October and St Helena on 3 December. She arrived at the Downs on 31 January 1798. Wedgebrough received a letter of marque on 14 July 1798.

Lloyd's List reported in 1800 that a privateer had captured Princess Royal, "late Company's ship", in November 1799 off the coast of Sumatra. The captor was reported to be the privateer Malartic, of 12 guns. Malartic's captain was the noted French privateer Jean-Marie Dutertre. Le Moniteur Universel reported on 2 floréal an VIII (22 April 1800) that two privateers had captured Princess Royal and 15 lesser vessels, with a note stating that the 120-man Malartic had alone captured Princess Royal. (Note: Gallois stated that Princess Royal would have carried 24 to 30 guns, with a crew of 200 to 250 men. This represents a more than doubling of both guns and men.)
