= Harmony (1798 ship) =

British merchantman 1798–1821

History

Great Britain
- Name: Harmony
- Launched: 1798, Lancaster
- Fate: Lost 1821

General characteristics
- Tons burthen: 368, or 376 (bm)
- Complement: 1803: 40; 1805: 50; 1807: 40
- Armament: 1803: 16 × 6-pounder guns; 1805: 4 × 9-pounder guns + 16 × 24-pounder carronades; 1807: 4 × 9-pounder guns + 16 × 24-pounder carronades

Harmony was launched in 1798 in Lancaster as a West Indiaman. Between 1805 and 1807 she sailed to the Pacific on a privateering voyage (Spain and England then being at war). Early in the voyage she was engaged in a single ship action in which her target repelled the attack, killing Harmony's master and inflicting severe casualties on her crew. Although Harmony returned to trading with the West Indies, in 1817 she made one voyage to India under a licence from the British East India Company. On her return she traded between Hull and Petersburg, and Quebec. New owners in 1821 decided to use her as a whaler in the northern whale fishery. She was lost there on her first whaling voyage.

== Career ==
Harmony first appeared in Lloyd's Register (LR) in 1799.

Year	Master	Owner	Trade	Source
1799	Alexander	Ritchie	Greenock–Jamaica	LR
1803	Alexander; R.Leitch; Jn Reed	Ritchie	Greenock–Jamaica	LR

After the resumption of war with France, Captain John Reid acquired a letter of marque on 22 September 1803.

Year	Master	Owner	Trade	Source & notes
1804	J.Reid	Ritchie	Cork–Barbados	LR

On 27 April 1804, Harmony, Reed, master, was in company with Nile, Griffiths, master, when Nile foundered at 50°N 28°W after having thrown her guns overboard. Both were sailing from St Thomas at the time. Harmony and May rescued the crew and brought them into Liverpool.

When Harmony returned to Liverpool on 28 February 1805, she carried a cargo of 110 tons of fustic, 824 bales of cotton, and staves. She had come from St Thomas via Charleston.

Year	Master	Owner	Trade	Source & notes
1805	J.Reid; L.Affleck	Ritchie	Greenock–St Thomas	LR
1806	L.Affleck	Ritchie	Greenock–Madeira	LR
1806	Affleck	Ritchie	Greenock–Jamaica; Greenock–South Seas	RS; thorough repair 1804

Voyage to the Pacific (1805–1807): Captain Ludwige Affleck acquired a letter of marque on 25 June 1805. (Note: Although major sources on the whaling trade, such as Clayton, suspect that this voyage was for whaling, it was almost certainly a privateering voyage. At the time Britain and Spain were at war, and several British vessels sailed to privateer off the coast of South America. The extent of Harmony's armament and the size of her crew were more consistent with privateering than whaling.) On 22 September Harmony, Affleck, master, sailed from the Clyde for Madeira. On 20 October Harmony was at 11°00′S 33°30′W, off Tenerife, when she encountered a brig of 16 guns and 170 men, that Affleck believed to be Spanish though the brig was not flying colours. He determined to capture her. The winds were too light to permit Harmony to get close to the brig so Affleck took 23 men in one boat and 22 men in two other boats, and rowed towards the brig. As they came alongside the men on the brig opened fire with small arms and repelled the attack. The British had to withdraw, having lost Affleck and eight men killed, and 18 men wounded, many seriously.

In December 1806 Harmony, Smith (late Affleck), master, was at Rio de Janeiro. There she took on enough men to increase her complement to more than 100 men.

On 28 October 1806, Harmony, [Frazer] Smith, master, late Affleck, was reported well on the coast of Chili, and was expected to sail for England 16 days later. On 3 September 1807 Harmony, Smith, master, arrived back in the Clyde from the South Seas.

Captain John Innis acquired a letter of marque on 18 November 1807.

Year	Master	Owner	Trade	Source & notes
1808	Affleck; Innis; Duncan	Ritchie	Greenock–Madeira	LR
1809	J.Innis; Duncan	Ritchie	Greenock–West Indies	Register of Shipping; thorough repair 1804 & damages repaired 1808

Innis sailed Harmony to Demerara. On her way back to Britain in June 1808 she had to put into Grenada, having sustained damage. On 8 September Harmony, Innes, master, coming from Suriname, arrived at Gravesend.

Year	Master	Owner	Trade	Source & notes
1810	Malcolm; Bells	Ritchie	London–Yucatan	LR; damages repaired 1810

On her way back from the Yucatan, Harmony, Malcolm, master, had to put into Havana for repairs. On 20 December 1809 she arrived back at Gravesend.

Year	Master	Owner	Trade	Source & notes
1812	Bell; J.Hornby	Ritchie	London–West Indies	LR; damages repaired 1810
1814	Hornby; T.Flint	Ritchie	Bristol–Guadeloupe	LR
1816	T.Flint	Ritchie	Cowes–Honduras	LR

In 1813 the EIC had lost its monopoly on the trade between India and Britain. British ships were then free to sail to India or the Indian Ocean under a licence from the EIC.

On 4 July 1817, Harmony, Wishart, master, sailed for Bombay under a licence from the EIC. She arrived in Bengal on 27 November. She arrived back at Hull on 1 August 1818. (Note: Harmony does not appear in the most complete listing of vessels sailing for the EIC or under a licence from it.)

Year	Master	Owner	Trade	Source & notes
1818	T.Clark; Thompson	Bolton & Co. Lett & Co.	Hull–India	LR
1819	W.Thompson	Lett & Co.	Hull–Petersburg	LR
1820	W.Thompson; J.Norman	Loft & Co.	Hull–Petersburg	LR; large repair 1819
1821	J.Norman; J.Glenton	Loft & Co.	Hull–Quebec	LR; large repair 1819 & 1820
1822	Glenton	Gee & Co.	Hull–Davis Strait	RS; good repair 1817 and thorough repair 1821

== Fate ==
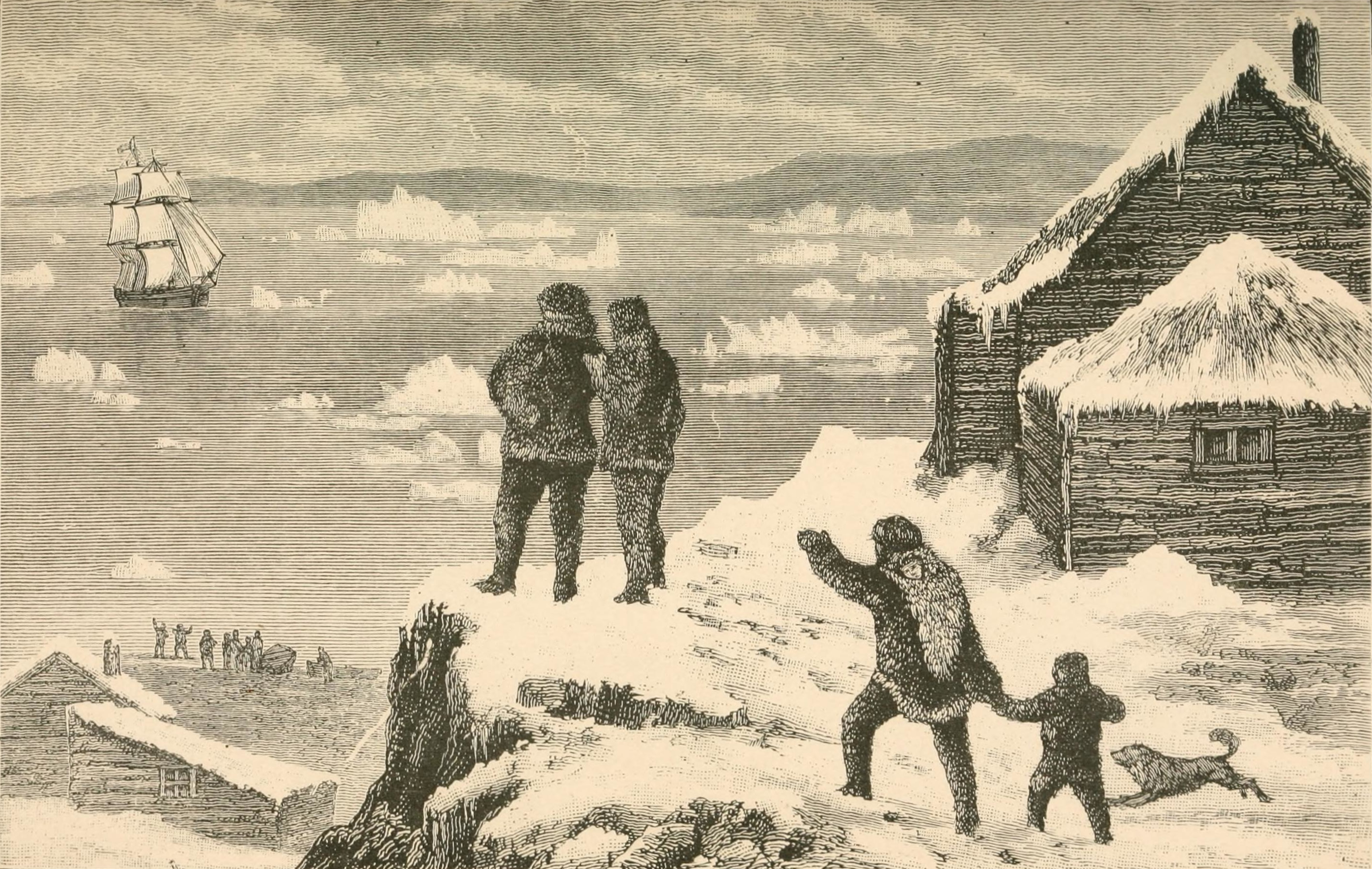
Arrival of the good ship Harmony, off the coast of Labrador

Harmony became a whaler in the northern whale fisheryand was lost in 1821 in Davis Strait. She was one of 10 whalers lost in Davis Strait that year.

The Register of Shipping for 1822 had the annotation "LOST" by her name.
