= Jane (1805 ship) =

British slave ship

History

United Kingdom
- Name: Jane
- Builder: Liverpool
- Launched: 1805
- Fate: Exploded 1806

General characteristics
- Tons burthen: 194 (bm)
- Complement: 32
- Armament: Letter of Marque: 16 × 9-pounder guns; LR:4 × 9-pounder guns + 12 × 9-pounder carronades

Jane was launched at Liverpool in 1805 as a slave ship in the triangular trade in enslaved people. An explosion, the result of a rebellion by her captives, destroyed her in 1806.

Jane first appeared in Lloyd's Register (LL) in 1805 with Magennis, master, Falkner & Co., owners, and trade Liverpool–Africa. Captain John Magginnis acquired a letter of marque on 22 July 1805. Captain John Maginnis sailed from Liverpool on 11 August 1805.

While Jane, McGinnis, master, was at the Congo she blew up in 1806, reportedly as the result of a rebellion. The Trans Atlantic Slave Trade database reports that almost the entire crew and all the captives were killed. However, Lloyd's List (LL) reported that Byam, a ship also gathering captives at the Congo, had rescued the master, crew, and 25 captives and delivered them to Dutch Guiana. One source described the rebellion as partly successful in that it resulted in some captives regaining their freedom.
