= Nile (1800 ship) =

Slave ship (1800–1803)

History

Spain
- Launched: 1786
- Captured: c.1799

Great Britain
- Name: Nile
- Namesake: Battle of the Nile
- Acquired: c.1800 by purchase of a prize
- Fate: Foundered 1804

General characteristics
- Tons burthen: 297 bm
- Sail plan: Brig
- Complement: 1800:30; 1803:30
- Armament: 1800:20 × 9-pounder guns; 1803:12 × 9-pounder guns

Nile was built in Spain in 1786 and was taken in prize. She first appears in readily accessible British records in 1800. She made three voyages as a slave ship, foundering on her third after having disembarked her slaves.

== Slave voyage #1 (1800–1801) ==
Captain John Givin received a letter of marque on 18 February 1800.

Captain Gwin sailed from Liverpool on 5 March 1800, bound for West Africa. Nile arrived at Kingston on 20 September where she landed 300 slaves. She sailed from Kingston on 29 November and arrived back at Liverpool on 1 January 1801. she had left with 45 crew members and she suffered five crew deaths on her voyage.

Nile first appeared in Lloyd's Register (LR) in 1801 with John Gwinn, master, Fairclough, owner, and trade Liverpool–Africa. She had damages repaired in 1801.

== Slave voyage #2 (1801–1802) ==
Captain Gwin sailed from Liverpool on 5 July 1801, bound for West Africa. Nile arrived at Kingston on 2 February 1802 where she landed 291 slaves. She left on 2 May and arrived back at Liverpool on 2 July. She had left with 44 crew members and she suffered four crew deaths on the voyage.

On one of the two above voyages Captain left five of his crew, including the second mate, on shore in Africa. This was a common punishment.

== Slave voyage #3 (1803) ==
Captain John Griffiths acquired a letter of marque on 2 July 1803. He sailed from Liverpool on 7 April 1803, and arrived at St Thomas on 14 December 1803. She landed 293 slaves. Nile, Griffiths, master, was sold at St Thomas.

== Fate ==
Lloyd's List (LL) reported on 4 May 1804 that Nile, Griffiths, master, had foundered off Saint Thomas soon after leaving on a voyage from that island to Liverpool. The foundering occurred on 28 April at 50°N 28°W, and after Nile had thrown her guns overboard. She was in company with Harmony, which rescued the crew, together with May, and brought the men into Liverpool.
