= Princess Royal (1794 ship) =

History

United Kingdom
- Name: Princess Royal
- Owner: Simms & Co., London
- Builder: Jacob Preston, Great Yarmouth
- Launched: 23 September 1794
- Fate: Last listed in Lloyd's Register in 1834

General characteristics
- Tons burthen: 400, or 402, or 405 (bm)
- Propulsion: Sail
- Complement: 34
- Armament: 1796:12 × 6-pounder guns + 2 swivel guns; 1797: 6 × 9-pounder guns; 1805: 6 × 6-pounder guns

Princess Royal was launched at Great Yarmouth in September 1794 and for the next three years traded with the West Indies. She made one voyage for the British East India Company (EIC) in 1797-8. On her return she resumed general trading. In 1822 and again in 1829 she transported convicts to New South Wales. She was last listed in Lloyd's Register in 1834.

== EIC voyage (1797-1798) ==
Captain Peter Foubister received a letter of marque on 20 December 1796. (Note: Hackman appears to have mixed up the names of the captains on Princess Royal of 405 tons (bm), and on Princess Royal of 805 tons (bm). Registers of Letters of marque and entries in Lloyd's Register provide the evidence for the occurrence of a mix-up.) Lloyd's Register for 1797 gives the captain's name as "Forbuster" and her trade as London-Jamaica, changing to London-India.

Foubister sailed Princess Royal from Falmouth on 16 February 1797, bound for Madras and Bengal. She reached the Cape on 16 May and arrived at Madras on 11 July. She was at Pondicherry on 11 August, and then returned to Madras 16 August.

The British government chartered Princes Royal to serve as a transport in a planned attack on Manila. She sailed to Penang, where she arrived on 6 September, where she joined the other vessels. However, the British Government cancelled the invasion following a peace treaty with Spain and the EIC released the vessels it had engaged.

Princess Royal returned to Madras on 11 December. She arrived at Calcutta on 28 January 1798. She left Diamond Harbour on 8 March, reached Simons Bay on 14 June and St Helena on 6 August, and arrived at The Downs on 18 October.

Lloyd's Register for 1799 gives her master's name as Forbuster, changing to M'Donald, and her trade as London-India, changing to London-Jamaica.

By 1805 Princess Royal was a London-based transport with Hoseason, master, and Sims & co., owners.

== First convict voyage (1822-1823) ==
Princess Royal left Britain on 5 November 1822 and arrived at Sydney on 9 March 1823. Her captain was Henry Sherwood. She embarked 156 male convicts, two of whom died on the voyage.

On 6 February 1825 a collier brig ran into the "Princess Royal Transport" and carried off her bowsprit.

== Second convict voyage (1829) ==
Princess Royal left Britain on 6 January 1829 and arrived at Sydney on 9 May 1829. Henry Sherwood was again her captain. She embarked 100 female convicts, all of whom survived the journey. (Note: Smith has written a history of the 100 women who came to Australia on Princess Royal.)

== Register listings ==
Year	Master	Owner	Trade
1820	J. Arkley	Lenox & Co.	London—Sierra Leone
1825	Sherwood	G. Brown	London—New South Wales
1830	P. Sherwood	Lenox & Co.	London transport
1834	Greenwood	Scott	London—New South Wales
