= Earl of Wycombe (1786 EIC ship) =

History

Great Britain
- Name: Earl of Wycombe
- Namesake: Earl of Wycombe
- Owner: EIC voyages #1-3:Anthony Brough; EIC voyages #4-6:John Woolmore
- Builder: Smallshaw & Rogers, Liverpool
- Launched: November 1786
- Fate: Foundered without a trace c.1803

General characteristics
- Tons burthen: 650, 655, or 65539/94 (bm)
- Length: Overall:128 ft 0 in (39.0 m); Keel:102 ft 1 1/4 in (31.1 m) (keel)
- Beam: 34 ft 8 3/4 in (10.6 m)
- Depth of hold: 12 ft 11 in (3.9 m)
- Propulsion: Sails
- Sail plan: Full-rigged ship
- Complement: 1794:80; 1798:80; 1800:40
- Armament: 1794:20 × 6-pounder guns; 1798:20 × 9-pounder guns; 1800:20 × 9-pounder guns + 6 × 18-pounder carronades
- Notes: Three decks

Earl of Wycombe (or Earl Wycombe) was launched in 1786 as an East Indiaman. She made six voyages for the British East India Company (EIC). In 1800 she became a general trader, trading across the Atlantic to the West Indies and Canada. She was lost without a trace c.1803.

== Career ==
EIC voyage #1 (1787–1788): Captain John William Wood sailed from The Downs on 14 March 1787, bound for China. Earl of Wycombe arrived at Whampoa anchorage on 2 August. Homeward bound, she crossed the Second Bar on 18 December, reached St Helena on 26 February 1788, and arrived at The Downs 26 April.

EIC voyage #2 (1789–1790): Captain Wood sailed from The Downs on 1 May 1789, bound for China. Earl of Wycombe arrived at Whampoa anchorage on 20 September. Homeward bound, she crossed the Second Bar on 2 January 1790, reached St Helena on 14 March, and arrived at The Downs on 21 May.

EIC voyage #3 (1792–1793): Captain Wood sailed from Torbay on 9 February 1792, bound for Bencoolen and China. Earl of Wycombe arrived at the Cape of Good Hope on 14 May, and reached Bencoolen on 23 July. She arrived at Whampoa on 10 October. Homeward bound, she crossed the Second Bar on 9 January 1793, reached Batavia and St Helena on 6 May, and arrived at The Downs on 1 July.

The EIC inspected the East Indiamen as they arrived and on 15 October fined Wood and eight other captains £100 each for having not stowed their cargoes in conformance with the company's orders. The money was to go to Poplar Hospital. (Note: There was a second assessment, on 30 July 1794 of a fine, but whether this was a restatement or a separate assessment is unclear.)

EIC voyage #4 (1794–1795): Captain Wood acquired a letter of marque on 8 February 1794.

The British government held Earl of Wycombe at Portsmouth, together with a number of other Indiamen in anticipation of using them as transports for an attack on Île de France (Mauritius). It gave up the plan and released the vessels in May 1794. It paid £1,087 1s 4d for having delayed her departure by 62 days.

Wood sailed from Portsmouth on 2 May, bound for St Helena on Bencoolen. Earl of Wycombe reached St Helena on 13 August and arrived at Bencoolen on 20 November. On 25 February 1795 she was at "Pulo Massey", and then she returned to Bencoolen on 4 March. Homeward bound, she reached St Helena on 22 May and Shannon on 14 September; she arrived at The Downs on 15 October.

EIC voyage #5 (1796–1797): Captain Wood sailed from Portsmouth on 6 March 1796, bound for Madras. Earl of Wycombe reached São Tiago on 5 April and Simon's Bay on 23 July. She arrived at Madras on 23 July. Homeward bound, she was at the Cape on 2 November, reached St Helena on 5 December, and arrived at The Downs on 14 February 1797.

EIC voyage #6 (1797–1800): Captain Dixon Meadows acquired a letter of marque on 19 May 1797. According to Thomas Twining, a passenger, the ship set out from Portsmouth with the convoy on 5 June 1797, but following a collision with Coutts off Eddystone on 8 June, lost part of her bow and forestays, and was forced to turn back. Earl of Wycombe finally sailed from Torbay on 22 September in the next convoy, bound for Madras and Bengal. Twining tells of severe water shortage and an outbreak of scurvy after passing the Cape. She reached Madras on 3 February 1798. She was at Kedgeree on 10 March, Saugor on 12 June, and Calcutta on 26 July. Bound for Bombay, she was again at Saugor on 19 January 1799 and Madras on 21 February. On 9 April she was at Cannanore and on 13 April Tellicherry. She arrived at Bombay on 5 May. Homeward bound, she reached St Helena on 17 September and Cork on 12 January 1800. She arrived back at The Downs on 1 February.

== General merchantman ==
Lloyd's Register for 1800 showed Earl Wycombe with J. Taylor, master, Hughan, owner, and trade London–Jamaica. Captain James Taylor acquired a letter of marque on 23 June 1800.

The Register of Shipping for 1804 showed Earl Wycombe with J. Meadell, master, Beckwith, owner, and trade Liverpool–Pictou.

== Fate ==
Lloyd's List for 18 November 1803 reported that Earl of Wycombe, bound for Liverpool, had put back into Halifax, Nova Scotia, leaky.

On 27 December 1803 Earl of Wycombe sailed from Halifax, Nova Scotia, for Liverpool. She was never heard from again.
