= USS Evea (YT-458) =

History

United States
- Name: USS Resolute 16 May 1943–9 June 1943; USS Evea 9 June 1943–11 November 1944
- Namesake: Resolute: marked by firm determination; resolved (previous name retained); Evea, a prominent Native American Comanche chief
- Acquired: 16 May 1943
- Renamed: USS Evea 9 June 1943
- Reclassified: Large harbor tug, YTB-458, 15 May 1944
- Fate: Transferred to French Navy 11 November 1944; Later returned to United States and sold

General characteristics
- Type: Tug

USS Evea (YT-458), originally the sixth USS Resolute (YT-458), later YTB-458, was a United States Navy tug in commission from 1943 to 1944.

== Design and construction ==
In the early 1940s a series of Allaquippa-class district tugs (YT) were ordered from Gulfport Boiler & Welding Works of Port Arthur, Texas by General Motors for transfer before completion to the United States Navy. These tugs had a displacement off 300 tons and were 102 feet 3 inches length overall, 95 feet length between perpendiculars, 24 feet in beam and with a draught of 10 feet. They were powered by a 1000 bhp diesel-electric engine, supplied by General Motors, and driving a single propeller.

== World War II service ==
Five of the Allaquippa-class tugs were completed for the British Royal Navy and supplied under the Lend-Lease Act. The last of these, Yard No. 194 from Gulfport, was designated BYT 5 by the U.S. Navy, given the name Resolute on completion and transferred to the U.K. on 26 March 1942. She served in the Mediterranean as a salvage tug.

She was acquired by the U.S. Navy at the Moroccan Sea Frontier on 16 May 1943 and placed in service as the harbor tug USS Resolute (YT-458). She was renamed USS Evea (YT-458) on 9 June 1943. Assigned duty in North African waters, she was reclassified as a "large harbor tug" and redesignated YTB-458 on 15 May 1944. During her service in the Mediterranean area she was involved in the Sicilian occupation (9–15 July 1943), the Salerno Landings (9–21 September 1943), and the Invasion of Southern France (15 August – 25 September 1944).

== French Navy ==
Evea was transferred to the French Navy under Lend-Lease at Marseille in autumn 1944 and renamed Malabar (A 709). France later nominally returned Evea to the United States, after which she was stricken from the Naval Vessel Register and sold to France. On 26 November 1946 the tug sailed from Toulon for Singapore towing the French Navy steam tug Tulear, destined for service at Saigon. Malabar was then deployed as a port tug at Diego Suarez, Madagascar, where she arrived on 26 March 1947.

On 19 July 1967 Malabar capsized and sank while assisting the 51,270 DWT British tanker Mobil Enterprise outside the port of Diego Suarez. In the accident ten of her crew lost their lives.
