= Thetis (1786 EIC ship) =

History

Great Britain
- Name: Thetis
- Namesake: Thetis
- Owner: Thomas Newte
- Operator: British East India Company
- Builder: Perry, Blackwall
- Launched: 25 September 1786
- Fate: Broken up 1806

General characteristics
- Tons burthen: 799, or 804, or 80487/94, or 868 (bm)
- Length: Overall:143 ft 6 1/2 in (43.8 m); Keel:115 ft 11 1/2 in (35.3 m)
- Beam: 36 ft 1 1/2 in (11.0 m)
- Depth of hold: 14 ft 10 in (4.5 m)
- Complement: 1794:90; 1800:80
- Armament: 1794: 26 × 9&4-pounder guns + 6 swivel guns; 1800: 26 × 6&12-pounder guns

Thetis was launched on the river Thames in 1786 as an East Indiaman. She made six voyages for the British East India Company between 1787 and 1800, She was then sold and spent a handful of years as a West Indiaman. She was broken up in 1806.

== EIC voyages ==
1st EIC voyage (1787–1788): Captain Justinian Nutt sailed from the Downs on 6 January 1787, bound for Bengal. Thetis arrived at Diamond Harbour on 27 May and was at Saugor on 2 November. She left Bengal on 21 January 1788, reached St Helena on 1 April, and arrived back at the Downs on 25 June.

2nd EIC voyage (1788–1790): Captain Justinian Nutt sailed from the Downs on 30 November 1788, bound for Bombay and China. Thetis was at Madeira on 26 December and arrived at Bombay on 22 May 1789. Sailing on to China, she left Bombay on 4 August and arrived at Whampoa Anchorage on 26 September. Homeward bound, she crossed the Second Bar on 19 January 1790, reached St Helena on 15 April, and arrived back in the Downs on 20 June.

3rd EIC voyage (1792–1793): Captain Justinian Nutt sailed from Portsmouth on 5 May 1792, bound for China. Thetis arrived at Whampoa on 19 September. Homeward bound, she crossed the Second Bar on 1 January 1793, reached St Helena on 27 March, and arrived back in the Downs on 16 June.

The EIC inspected the East Indiamen as they arrived and on 15 October fined Nutt and eight other captains £100 each for having not stowed their cargoes in conformance with the company's orders. The money was to go to Poplar Hospital. (Note: There was a second announcement, on 30 July 1794 of a fine, but whether this was a restatement or a separate assessment is unclear.)

4th EIC voyage (1794–1795): War with France had begun in February 1793. Captain Henry Bullock acquired a letter of marque on 7 April 1794. He sailed from Plymouth on 20 June 1794, bound for Bengal and Madras. He sailed from Plymouth on 20 June 1794, bound for Bengal and Madras. Thetis arrived at Diamond Harbour on 8 December. Homeward bound, she was at Saugor on 19 March 1795, stopped at Madras on 13 April, reached St Helena on 14 August, and arrived at the Downs on 25 November.

5th EIC voyage (1796–1797): Captain Bullock sailed from Portsmouth on 17 May 1796, bound for Madras, Bengal and Ceylon. Thetis reached Madras on 10 September and arrived at Diamond Harbour on 20 October. She left Bengal on 18 January 1797 and reached Pointe de Galle on 30 January. She stopped at Colombo on 10 February before returning to Point de Galle on 4 March. Homeward bound, she was at Trincomalee on 26 March, and reached the Cape on 12 July. She left the Cape on 26 August, reached St Helena on 11 September, and arrived back in the Downs on 13 December.

6th EIC voyage (1798–1800): Captain Bullock sailed from Portsmouth on 8 June 1798, bound for Madras and Bengal. Thetis reached Madras 1 October and arrived at Diamond Harbour on 29 October. On 6 November she arrived at Calcutta.

On 23 February 1799 Earl Fitzwilliam caught fire while she was in the Hoogly river. Nonsuch sent a boat, but she would not approach closer than 600 ft (183 m) to Earl Fitzwilliam because Earl Fitzwilliam's guns, which had been loaded were firing from the heat, and because of fear that the vessel itself would explode. A boat from Thetis came within an oar's length of Earl Fitzwilliam and hauled in as many crew members as it could. A midshipman from Thetis, with two sailors, rowed back and forth between the wreck and the larger boats that were standing off, and kept up his shuttle service until all the men still on board were rescued.

On 21 March Thetis left Saugor. She arrived at Madras on 11 April and she stayed there until 13 August. She reached St Helena on 26 October and Cork on 12 January. She arrived back in the Downs on 1 February.

== West Indiaman ==
Thetis was sold in 1800 to Anderson & Co., who sailed her as a West Indiaman. Captain John Cameron acquired a letter of marque on 4 September 1800. Thetis first appeared in Lloyd's Register (LR), in 1800.

Year	Master	Owner	Trade	Source
1800	Cameron	Anderson & Co.	London–Jamaica	LR; good repair 1798
1806	Cameron	Anderson & Co.	London–Jamaica	LR; good repair 1798

== Fate ==
On 30 July 1806 Thetis's register was cancelled, demolition being completed.
