= Earl Fitzwilliam (1786 EIC ship) =

History

British East India Company
- Name: Earl Fitzwilliam
- Namesake: Earl Fitzwilliam
- Owner: EIC voyages 1-4: James Farquharson; EIC voyage 5: William Fraser
- Builder: Barnard, Deptford
- Launched: 1786
- Fate: Burnt 23 February 1799

General characteristics
- Tons burthen: 750, 803, or 80334/94 (bm)
- Length: Overall:143 ft 6 in (43.7 m); Keel:116 ft 0 in (35.4 m)
- Beam: 36 ft 1 in (11.0 m)
- Depth of hold: 14 ft 10 in (4.5 m)
- Complement: 100
- Armament: 26 × 9&4-pounder guns

Earl Fitzwilliam was launched in 1786 at Deptford. She made four voyages for the British East India Company (EIC). She made four complete voyages for the EIC, three to India and one to India and China. She caught fire on 23 February 1799 on her fifth voyage while she was in the River Ganges.

== Career ==
=== 1st EIC voyage (1787–1788) ===
Captain James Dundas sailed from the Downs on 18 February 1787, bound for Madras and China. Earl Fitzwilliam was at Madeira on 12 March, reached Madras on 22 June, and arrived at Whampoa Anchorage on 4 October.

On 2 December Captain William Greer of Belvedere, which had arrived at Canton a few days earlier, had a seaman put into chains. A few days later some 10 crewmen mutinied and threw their officers overboard. No one drowned. Captain James Dundas, the senior EIC captain at Canton, gathered men from the other Indiamen there, suppressed the mutiny, and incarcerated the mutineers on Earl Fitzwilliam. A court of 16 EIC captains tried the mutineers on 15 December. Two were sentenced to 180 lashes around the fleet; the others were subject to a smaller number of lashes aboard Belvedere.

Homeward bound, Earl Fitzwilliam crossed the Second Bar on 3 February 1788, reached St Helena pm 20 May, and arrived at Long Reach on 15 July.

=== 2nd EIC voyage (1790–1791) ===
Captain Dundas sailed from Portsmouth on 14 March 1790, bound for Bengal and Madras. Earl Fitzwilliam was at Madeira on 5 April, and arrived at Diamond Harbour on 13 August. Homeward bound, she was at Cox's Island on 13 December, and Madras on 19 January 1791. She was at 'Broken Ground', Bengal, on 6 February, and Madras again on 9 April. She reached the Cape on 9 July and St Helena on 3 August, and arrived back at Long Reach on 9 October.

=== 3rd EIC voyage (1793–1794) ===
War with France broke out in early 1793. Captain James Tweedale acquired a letter of marque on 23 June 1793. He sailed from Portsmouth on 7 July 1793, bound for Bombay. Earl Fitzwilliam arrived at Bombay on 2 December. From there she sailed to Surat, arriving there on 21 December, and returned to Bombay on 31 December. Homeward bound, she was at Tellicherry on 16 March 1794, Calicut on 31 March, and Quilon on 10 April. She reached St Helena on 28 June and arrived back at Long Reach on 10 September.

=== 4th EIC voyage (1795–1797) ===
Captain Tweedale sailed from Portsmouth on 9 July 1795, bound for Madras and Bengal. Earl Fitzwilliam was at Rio de Janeiro on 7 September and reached Madras on 16 December. She arrived at Kedgeree on 20 February 1796. Homeward bound, she was at Saugor on 10 May, Madras again on 2 July, and the Cape on 4 November. She reached St Helena on 5 December, and arrived at Purfleet on 18 February 1797.

== Fate ==
Captain Tweedale sailed from Torbay on 22 September 1797, bound for Bengal. On 8 December she was at 26°00′N 20°30′W on her way to Bengal. She was in company with the whaler Venus, which was on her way to the southern whale fishery.

A fire destroyed Earl Fitzwilliam on 23 February 1799 while she was in the Hooghly River. The fire began in the gun-room and quickly spread out of control. Crew threw anything floatable overboard and the lascars jumped into the river. The officers and Europeans gathered in the forecastle. As the fire consumed the ship, her guns, which were loaded, started to cook-off, sending their shot everywhere. The men remaining on the vessel feared that she would explode too. Nonsuch sent a boat, but she would not approach closer than 600 ft (183 m) to Earl Fitzwilliam. A boat from Thetis came within an oar's length of Earl Fitzwilliam and hauled in as many crew members as it could. A midshipman from Thetis, with two sailors, rowed back and forth between the wreck and the larger boats that were standing off, and kept up his shuttle service until all the men still on board were rescued. Earl Fitzwilliam drifted onto Saugor Sand and continued burning until 4am. In all, one officer and five other Europeans died; the loss among the lascars was unknown, but was believed to be small. The EIC lost 6,500 sacks of saltpeter, and 600 bales [of cotton]. In addition Captain Tweedale and the officers lost their private trade. The EIC put the value of its cargo on Fitzwilliam at £46,250.
