= French privateer Vengeur =

Numerous French privateers have borne the name Vengeur ("Avenger"):

== French Revolutionary Wars ==
- Vengeur was a French privateer of 12 guns that HMS Blanche captured on 1 October 1793.
- Vengeur was a French privateer that HMS Rose captured in the West Indies on 22 February 1794.
- Vengeur was a privateer commissioned at Île de France circa September 1793 under Captain Corosin (or Carosin) with 250 men and thirty-four 8&6-pounder guns. The East Indiaman Britannia and country ship Nonsuch captured her on 22 January 1794 during the Sunda Strait campaign of January 1794. She had sustained 37 killed and wounded. By one report, the Dutch at Batavia purchased Vengeur and would send her in July to Mauritius as a cartel with the French prisoners.
- Vengeur, French privateer cutter of 18 guns and 130 men. Lloyd's List reported on 22 September 1795 that Vengeur had captured several British merchant vessels.
- Vengeur, privateer of 18 guns and 110 men, that HMS Santa Margarita captured on 27 October 1796.
- Voltiguer was a French privateer schooner, formally the lugger Venguer. HMS Vestal captured her on 14 April 1797 off Flamborough Head and took her into the Humber.
- Vengeur des Francois was a French privateer of four guns and 35 men, belonging to Guadeloupe, that HMS Zephyr captured off Dominica on 18 June 1797.
- Vengeur was a new privateer schooner of 12 guns and 72 men that HMS Indefatigable, Cambrian, and Childers captured on 11 January 1798.
- Vengeur was a French letter of marque of six guns and 36 men that HMS Amaranthe captured on 13 April 1799 after a fierce and sanguinary engagement.
- Vengeur was a French privateer cutter of 14 guns and 105 men that HMS Martin captured on 28 April 1799. She was a 50-ton (French; "of load") cutter commissioned at Dunkirk in October 1795 under Joseph-Jean Allemès. She was under his command until July 1796 when Captain Margollé replaced him. Allemès resumed command in 1797, and under his command she captured numerous British vessels. Later that year Francois Sauvage-Cornu took command. In 1799 Benjamin-Richard Carny took command; at that time she had a crew of 58 men and carried 14 guns. Lastly, Charles Louis Tack replaced Carny. He sailed with 98 to 105 men and 12 to 14 guns.
- Vengeur was a French schooner (the former HMS Charlotte), of eight guns and 80 men, that HMS Solebay recaptured on 24 November 1799.
- Vengeur was a French privateer brig of six long 4-pounders and ten 18-pounder carronades, and a crew of 102 men that Indefatigable captured on 12 June 1800. Indefatigable shared the prize money with Sirius (1797).
- Vengeur was a French privateer lugger of two large swivel guns and 17 men that the hired armed cutter Swan captured on 1 March 1801.
- Vengeur was a privateer that HMS Mermaid captured on 11 January 1800.

== Napoleonic Wars ==
- Vengeur was a privateer lugger of 14 guns and 56 men that HMS Cruizer captured on 13 November 1806.
- Vengeur was a felucca-rigged privateer of one gun and some 50 men that the boats of HMS Success captured on 20 November 1805; Vengeur sank as she was being towed.
- Vengeur was a privateer of 16 guns and 48 men that HMS Beagle captured on 24 January 1809. She had been the schooner HMS Tobago, which the French had captured in 1806.
- Vengeur was a lugger privateer that HMS Revenge captured on 17 October 1810.

== See also ==
- French ship Vengeur - seven French naval vessels that bore the name Vengeur, or a derivative of it.
