= HMS Resolue (1795) =

Brig of the Royal Navy

HMS Resolue was the Spanish xebec O Hydra, that the French captured in 1794 and renamed Résolue in 1795. The British captured her in 1795; she was last listed in 1802.

The French navy captured O Hydra in December 1794 and renamed her Résolue in January 1795. She had a crew of 65 men and was armed with six 6 and 3-pounder guns.

The French navy reversed the name change in August, but before the name change took effect, Captain Horatio Nelson's squadron captured her on 16 August 1795 in the Bay of Alassio. At the time of her capture Hydra/Résolue was under the command of enseigne de vaisseau non entretenu Arnaud. Nelson's letter described her as a corvette polacco ship of ten guns, four swivel guns, and 87 men. She threw six guns overboard before she was captured. She was one of 11 ships that the British captured in the Bay.

The Royal Navy took her in as the gun-brig HMS Resolue and commissioned her for the Leeward Islands. She was last listed in 1802.

== Bibliography ==
- "Fonds Marine. Campagnes (opérations; divisions et stations navales; missions diverses). Inventaire de la sous-série Marine BB4. Tome premier : BB4 1 à 482 (1790-1826)" (PDF). www.servicehistorique.sga.defense.gouv.fr. Service historique du Ministère de la Défense. Archived from the original (PDF) on 20 April 2021.
- Winfield, Rif (2008). British Warships in the Age of Sail 1793–1817: Design, Construction, Careers and Fates. Seaforth Publishing. ISBN 978-1-86176-246-7.
- Winfield, Rif; Roberts, Stephen S. (2015). French Warships in the Age of Sail 1786–1861: Design Construction, Careers and Fates. Seaforth Publishing. ISBN 978-1-84832-204-2.
