= HMS Charlotte (1798) =

History

Great Britain
- Name: HMS Charlotte
- Acquired: Purchased in 1797
- Commissioned: 1798
- Fate: Captured by French privateer on 16 October 1798

France
- Name: Vengeur
- Fate: Recaptured by the Royal Navy on 24 November 1799 and broken up

General characteristics
- Sail plan: Schooner
- Complement: Royal Navy: 60; French Navy: 6 officers + 85 men
- Armament: Royal Navy: 8 × 6-pounder guns; French Navy: 8 × 8-pounder long guns

HMS Charlotte was a mercantile schooner that Royal Navy hired or chartered in 1796 (or earlier), purchased in 1797 and commissioned in 1798. In her brief military career in the Caribbean she captured two small enemy privateers before she herself fell prey to a French privateer. The British recaptured her a little more than a year later but then broke her up in 1799 rather than recommissioning her.

== Cruising ==
The Royal Navy armed Charlotte with eight 6-pounder guns and gave her a crew of 60 men. There are no records of any of her dimensions. She was commissioned under Lieutenant John Williams. A letter from Commander James Athol Wood of Favourite reporting on the recapture of a vessel on 9 March 1796, states that he put "The Officers on Board the Charlotte Sloop, Lieutenant Williams...".

On 29 May 1797 Charlotte captured the French schooner Mort, off Dominica. Mort was armed with four guns and had a crew of 36 men. She had not made any captures since leaving Guadeloupe.

On 9 September Charlotte captured the Dutch privateer Esle Andeneming, of Surinam. Esle Andeneming was armed with eight guns and had a crew of 38 men. She was provisioned for a three-month cruise and was nineteen days out, not having captured anything, when Charlotte captured her off the Demerary river.

== Capture ==
Lieutenant John Thicknesse replaced Williams. Shortly thereafter, on 16 October 1798 the French 14-gun privateer Enfant Prodigue captured Charlotte off Cap Français or Cape François, Hispaniola. Charlotte suffered one man wounded before she struck her colours. A second, smaller schooner and two large armed launches supported Enfant Prodigue in the attack on Charlotte, which suffered considerable damage. Her main boom topping lift and all the braces had been shot away. One gun had been dismounted and two others disabled by broken breeches, leaving her with only five guns to continue the action. Surrounded by the enemy and unable to manoeuvre, Thicknesse was forced to surrender. Charlotte's low casualty rate was a consequence of the French tactic of firing high to disable rigging. The subsequent court-martial honourably acquitted Thicknesse of the loss.

== Recapture ==
The French Navy took her into service as Vengeur. However, on 24 November 1799, Solebay recaptured her and three other armed vessels as well, off Cape Triburon as the four French vessels were becalmed while on their way from Cape François to Jacquemel. Vengeur was armed with eight brass 6-pounder guns and had a crew of 91 men. Drake shared in the capture.

== Fate ==
The Royal Navy chose to break up Charlotte/Vengeur rather than recommission her.

== General and cited references ==
- Demerliac, Alain (1999). La marine de la Révolution : nomenclature des navires français de 1792 à 1799 (in French). Nice: Éd. Omega. ISBN 2-906381-24-1. OCLC 163234570.
- Hepper, David J. (1994). British Warship Losses in the Age of Sail, 1650-1859. Rotherfield: Jean Boudriot. ISBN 0-948864-30-3. OCLC 622348295.
- James, William (1837). The Naval History of Great Britain, from the Declaration of War by France in 1793, to the Accession of George IV. R. Bentley.
- Roche, Jean-Michel (2005). Dictionnaire des bâtiments de la flotte de guerre française de Colbert à nos jours. Vol. 1. Group Retozel-Maury Millau. ISBN 978-2-9525917-0-6. OCLC 165892922. (1671–1870)
- Winfield, Rif (2008). British Warships in the Age of Sail 1793–1817: Design, Construction, Careers and Fates. Seaforth. ISBN 978-1-86176-246-7.
