= Agreeable (1798 ship) =

18th-century British slave ship

Great Britain
- Name: Agreeable
- Builder: Liverpool
- Launched: 1786, or 1788
- Captured: 1803

General characteristics
- Tons burthen: 189, or 198 (bm)
- Armament: 16 × 6-pounder guns

Agreeable was launched in 1786 in Liverpool, possibly under another name. Between 1798 and 1802 she made three voyages as a slave ship. A French privateer captured her in 1803 as she was sailing from Africa to the West Indies on her fourth slave trading voyage.

== Career ==
Agreeable first appeared in Lloyd's Register (LR) in 1798.

Year	Master	Owner	Trade	Source
1798	J.Siddon	T.Hind	Liverpool–Africa	LR

Agreeable's captain for her voyages transporting enslaved people was James Seddon, who was one of the leading captains of slave ships during the period 1785–1807. Between 1796 and 1806 he made nine voyages as a captain, sailing six different vessels for two different owners. He died on 8 October 1806, on his ninth voyage while captain of Trafalgar.

1st slave voyage (1798–1799): Captain James Seddon sailed from Liverpool on 16 July 1798. In 1800, 160 vessels sailed from British ports, bound to engage in the acquisition and transport of enslaved people; 149 of these vessels sailed from Liverpool.

Agreeable acquired captives in West Central Africa and she arrived at Kingston, Jamaica on 27 May 1799, with 290 captives. She left Kingston on 23 June and arrived back at Liverpool on 16 September. She had left with 33 crew members and she suffered six crew deaths on her voyage.

2nd slave voyage (1800–1801): Captain Seddon sailed from Liverpool on 7 May 1800. In 1800, 133 vessels sailed from British ports, bound to engage in the acquisition and transport of enslaved people; 120 of these vessels sailed from Liverpool.

Agreeable acquired captives in West Central Africa and she arrived at Kingston on 4 February 1801 with 222 captives. Either before or after she arrived at Kingston, but probably before, Agreeable was at Suriname. She sailed for Liverpool on 7 April and arrived there on 8 June. She had left Liverpool with 33 crew members and arrived at Kingston with 35; she suffered one crew death on her voyage.

3rd slave voyage (1801–1802): Captain Seddon sailed from Liverpool on 6 November 1801. In 1801, 147 vessels sailed from British ports, bound to engage in the acquisition and transport of enslaved people; 122 of these vessels sailed from Liverpool.

Agreeable acquired captives at Bonny and arrived at St Kitts on 19 June 1802 with 233 captives. She sailed from St Kitts on 25 July and arrived back at Liverpool on 10 September. She had left Liverpool with 27 crew members and she had suffered five crew deaths on her voyage.

4th slave voyage (1803–Loss): Captain Seddon sailed Agreeable, with her 24 crew members, from Liverpool on 8 March 1803. In 1803, 99 vessels sailed from British ports, bound to engage in the acquisition and transport of enslaved people; 83 of these vessels sailed from Liverpool.

While Agreeable was sailing from Africa to the West Indies, a privateer captured her to windward of Barbados. The privateer took Agreeable to Guadeloupe. (Note: Shortly thereafter, Seddon sailed Byam back to Liverpool from Barbados, her master, Captain George Martin, having died at Barbados after having delivered captives there.)

In 1803, some 11 British vessels engaged in the transport of enslaved people were lost. Seven of these vessels were lost in the Middle Passage, i.e., while sailing between Africa and the West Indies. During the period 1793 to 1807, war, rather than maritime hazards or resistance by the captives, was the greatest cause of vessel losses among British vessels in the triangular trade.
