= French ship Résolue =

Numerous French naval vessels have borne the name Résolue, the French for "Resolute", as have several privateers.

== Naval vessels ==
- French frigate Résolue (1778) was an Iphigénie-class frigate of 32 guns launched in 1778 that the British Royal Navy captured in 1798; she became HMS Resolue, serving as a slops ship and a receiving ship at Portsmouth until she was broken up in 1811.
- Résolue was a frigate obtained in 1784 from the razeed 44-gun ship of the line Romulus, formerly the British HMS Romulus, captured at Chasepeake Bay.
- Résolue was a requisitioned lugger that served in the Mediterranean in 1795. Her fate is currently unknown.
- Résolue was the Spanish xebec O Hydra, that the French captured in 1794, renamed Résolue in 1795 but then returned to her original name. The British captured her in 1795 and named her HMS Resolue; she was last listed in 1802.
- Dryade was a Pallas-class frigate launched in 1812 and renamed Résolue in 1830; she was wrecked in 1833 and broken up where she lay.
- French frigate Résolue (1863) was a Résolue-class frigate launched in 1863 as a sailing ship but not commissioned. Conversion to a steam frigate began c.1869 and was completed in 1872, when she was commissioned as a screw frigate. She was converted back to sail in 1877 for service as a training ship. She was decommissioned and struck in 1890. She became a coal hulk at Rochefort in 1891 and then a mooring hulk in 1893. She was sold in 1913 and broken up.

== Privateers and other ships ==
- Résolue, of 205 or 250 tons (French; of load) was a privateer commissioned at Île de France c. September 1793 under Captain Jolineaux (or Jallineaux). She had a crew of 230 men and was armed with six 12-pounder and an assortment of twenty 8 and 6-pounder guns. Nonsuch captured her on 22 January 1794 during the Sunda Strait campaign of January 1794 after inflicting heavy casualties. By one report, the Dutch at Batavia purchased Vengeur and would send her in July to Mauritius as a cartel with the French prisoners.
- Resolue (or Resolu), was a French privateer brig of 18 guns and 70 men that HMS Phaeton captured on 24 November 1798. Resolue had previously captured the English merchant ship General Wolfe, sailing from Poole to Newfoundland and an American sloop sailing from Boston to Hamburg.
- Résolue, of Saint-Malo, was a privateer of 14 guns and 65 men that HMS Spitfire captured in 1799.
- The chasse maree Résolue was transporting troops from Burles when HMS Mondovi captured her on 20 May 1801.
