= Trincomalee (disambiguation) =

Trincomalee is a city in Sri Lanka.

Trincomalee also may refer to:

- Trincomalee District, a district in Eastern Province, Sri Lanka, containing the city
  - Trincomalee Electoral District
  - Trincomalee Electoral District (1947–1989)
- List of ships named HMS Trincomalee

== See also ==
- Trincomalee massacre (disambiguation)
- Trincomali Channel, in the Gulf Islands of British Columbia, Canada
- Trincomalee Bay, Sri Lanka
  - Trincomalee Harbour
