= Battle of Mahé =

1801 battle of the East Indies theatre of the French Revolutionary Wars

- Part of the East Indies theatre of the French Revolutionary Wars
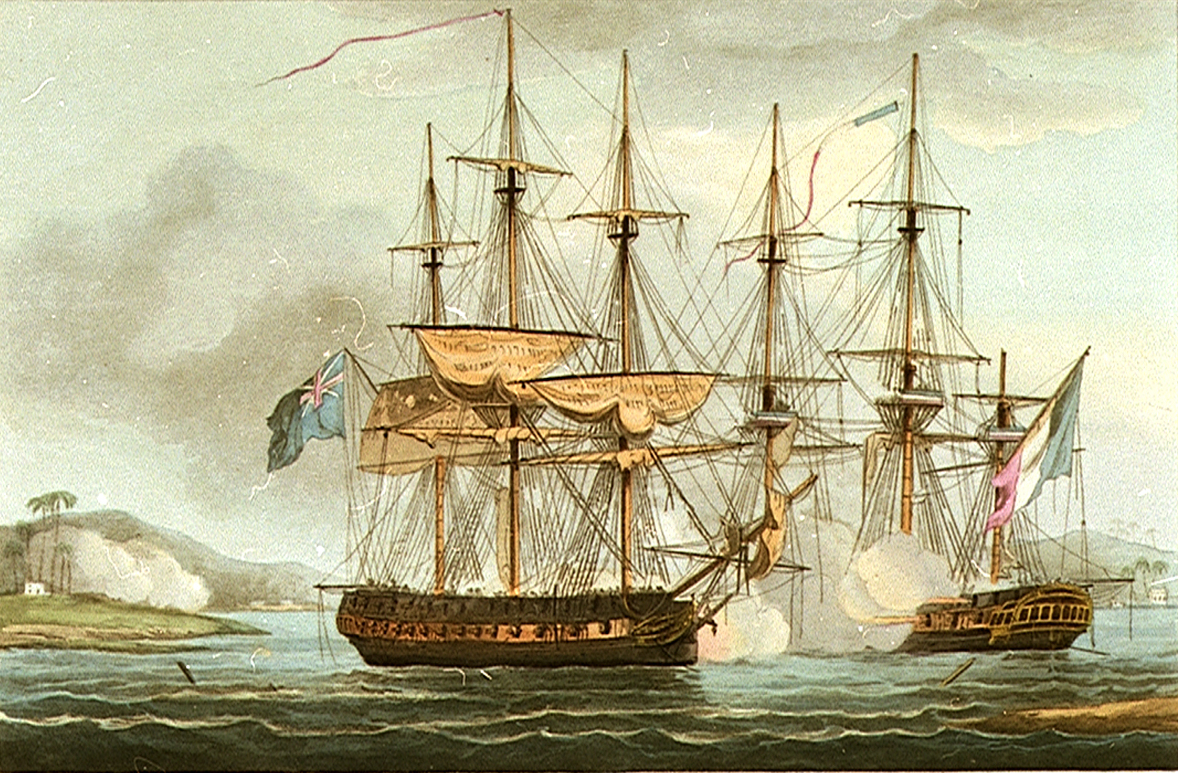
- Capture of La Chiffonne, Augt 19th 1801; Thomas Whitcombe, 1816
| Date | 19 August 1801 |
| Location | Off Mahé, Indian Ocean |
| Result | British victory |

Belligerents
| United Kingdom | France |

Commanders and leaders
| Charles Adam | Pierre Guiyesse (surrendered) |

Strength
| 1 frigate | 1 frigate |

Casualties and losses
| 2 killed 1 wounded | 23 killed 30 wounded 1 frigate captured |

The Battle of Mahé was a naval engagement of the East Indies theatre of the French Revolutionary Wars, fought on 19 August 1801 in the harbor of Mahé in the Seychelles, a French colony in the Indian Ocean. Since the demise of the French Indian Ocean squadron in 1799, the Royal Navy had maintained dominance in the East Indies, controlling the shipping routes along which trade flowed and allowing the rapid movement of military forces around the theatre. French First Consul Napoleon Bonaparte had long-harboured ambitions of threatening British India, and in 1798 had launched an invasion of Egypt as an initial step to achieving this goal. The campaign had failed, and the French army in Egypt was under severe pressure by early 1801, partly due to the presence of a British squadron acting with impunity in the Red Sea.

To disrupt British ships supplying the Red Sea squadron the French Navy sent the newly built 36-gun frigate Chiffonne to the Western Indian Ocean under the command of Pierre Guiyesse. This ship, also carrying 32 exiled political prisoners, was instructed to operate from Mahé. After an eventual journey, Chiffonne arrived in the Seychelles in August and Guiyesse ordered his crew to effect repairs before the mission could begin. Anchored in a bay sheltered by coral reefs and protected by a hastily erected gun battery, he believed his ship would be safe from attack.

The British commander in the region, Rear-admiral Peter Rainier, had assumed the French would send a force against the Red Sea squadron and ordered the 38-gun frigate HMS Sibylle under Captain Charles Adam to investigate. Adam sailed to Mahé and discovered the French ship undergoing repairs. Carefully manoeuvring through the coral reefs, Adam brought Sybille alongside Chiffonne and fought a brief but fiercely contested battle before Guiyesse was forced to surrender. A month later, the French brig Flèche, operating from the same harbour on the same mission, was intercepted and sunk by the brig HMS Victor. These operations were the last significant actions of the war in the Indian Ocean, the Peace of Amiens coming into effect in October.

== Background ==
In 1801 the French Revolutionary Wars were drawing to a close. The conflict, which had begun in 1792, had seen the new French Republic and its allies fighting against a shifting coalition of European powers, of which only Great Britain, recently renamed the United Kingdom, had been consistently opposed to France. In the Indian Ocean, where Britain maintained a lucrative trading Empire centred on British India, the Royal Navy had enjoyed almost continual supremacy under the command of Rear-Admiral Peter Rainier. Only between 1796 and 1799 had the French Navy, in the form of a squadron of frigates operating from the island base of Île de France under the command of Contre-amiral Pierre César Charles de Sercey, offered any resistance. Gradually this force had either returned to France or been defeated in battle, and the destruction of the frigate Preneuse at the Battle of Port Louis in December 1799 had restored absolute British control.

The importance of the East Indies to British trade encouraged a number of French plans to threaten the region, of which the most advanced was the invasion, in 1798, of Egypt by a French Army under General Napoleon Bonaparte. Although the campaign saw initial success, the annihilation of the French Mediterranean Fleet by Sir Horatio Nelson at the Battle of the Nile on 1 August 1798 effectively doomed the campaign to failure. Later in the year Bonaparte considered building a squadron at Suez in the Red Sea, but the plans were abandoned when a British squadron, operating from Jeddah under the command of Rear-Admiral John Blankett assumed control of the region. Bonaparte returned to France the following year, but the British Red Sea squadron remained in operation.

In 1801, a British army landed in Northern Egypt, sparking a short campaign which ended with the Capitulation of Alexandria and the complete surrender of French forces in the country. Blankett's squadron provided distant support for this effort, sending an army from the garrison of India up the Nile, although this force arrived too late to influence the campaign. The French however wished to disrupt British operations in the Red Sea, and considered a number of schemes including diverting Ganteaume's expedition to the Indian Ocean. Eventually however the only warship available was the newly constructed 36-gun frigate Chiffonne, which sailed from Nantes on 14 April 1801 under the command of Commander Pierre Guiyesse. Also on board were 32 political prisoners condemned to exile, who Guiyesse was ordered to land at Mahé.

== Guiyesse's journey ==
Chiffonne had an eventful voyage to the Indian Ocean, capturing a Portuguese merchant schooner off Brazil on 15 May and then encountering a Portuguese frigate Andorinha on 18 May. Armed with 24 24-pounder carronades, Andorinha was no match for Chiffonne's 36 12-pounder long guns and surrendered after a short fight. Guiyesse subsequently released the warship, although not before throwing the guns overboard and forcing the officers to agree parole. Passing the British-held Cape of Good Hope, Guiyesse captured the East Indiaman Bellona on 16 June, placing a prize crew aboard and sending the ship to Île de France, where it arrived without incident. Chiffonne however was not sailing for the naval base at Port Louis, but to the small French harbour on Mahé in the Seychelles. The Seychelles were a French colony administered by Île de France, although they had supposedly been declared neutral following an attack on Mahé by HMS Orpheus. More importantly for Guiyesse, Mahé was well situated as a base from which to prey on the British shipping routes to the Red Sea.

Rainier had been campaigning in the Indian Ocean since 1794, and had anticipated that the French might send a naval force to disrupt operations in the Red Sea. He surmised that the Seychelles were ideally situated for this type of operation and issued orders for one of his largest frigates to cruise in the area to intercept any French raiders. This ship was HMS Sibylle, a 38-gun frigate captured from the French in 1794 at the Battle of Mykonos. The commander was Charles Adam, who had replaced Edward Cooke after Cooke was mortally wounded during the capture of the French frigate Forte in the Bay of Bengal at the action of 28 February 1799.

On arriving at Mahé, Guiyesse landed his prisoners and ordered his men to make repairs to their frigate following their long journey. The foremast in particular needed work, and it was consequently removed, Guiyesse carefully anchoring Chiffonne at the centre of a complex series of coral reefs. The captured schooner and a small ketch were anchored alongside assisting with repairs and Guiyesse had ordered his men to establish a supporting gun battery on the shore, positioned to inflict raking fire on any ship attempting to engage the French frigate. This battery was composed of guns taken from the forecastle of Chiffonne, stabilised on wooden planks and protected by fascines. Behind the battery a furnace had been constructed to allow the guns to fire specially heated shot, designed to set fire to attacking ships.

== Battle ==
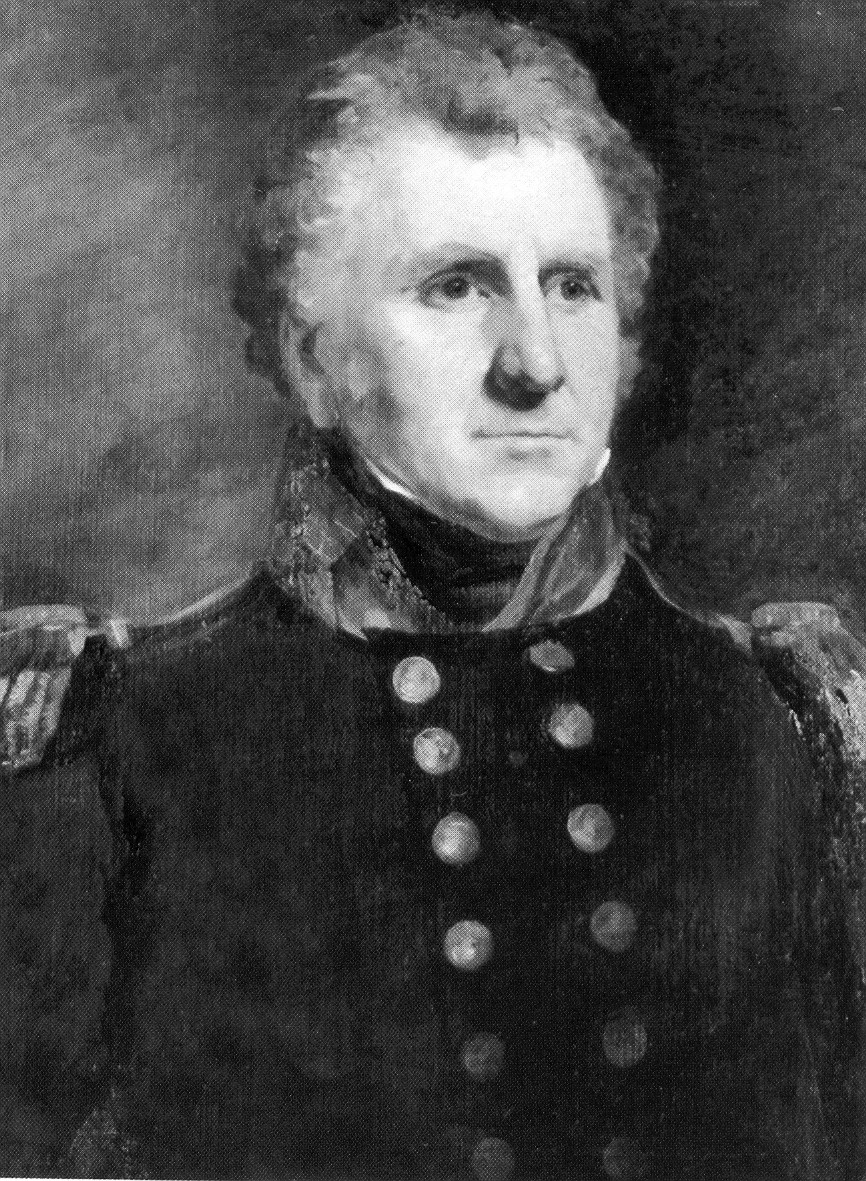
Charles Adam

In the early morning of 19 August, Sybille was reconnoitering the Seychelles when flag signals were observed over Ste. Anne Island, a small island to the east of Mahé. Adam felt this was an unusual circumstance and ordered his ship to investigate. Passing Ste. Anne flying false French colours, Chiffonne could be clearly seen at anchor close inshore at Mahé. Adam ordered the main topsail backed and prepared his ship with springs on the anchor cables to provide more maneuverability in shallow waters. The main batteries of 24-pounder long guns were cleared for action and, with his preparations made, Adam gave orders for the foresail set, gliding slowly forward into the complex system of reefs which sheltered the French ship. Passage through these obstacles was only possible by stationing a man at the masthead who was tasked with observing the colour of the water ahead of the ship: darker water indicated deeper water, but the gradations in color were so slight that they could only be observed from the vantage point on top of the mainmast.

Adam's slow progress took more than an hour, reaching the safer waters of the inner roads at 10:15. Guiyesse was prepared, and at 10:00 he had fired a warning shot at the distant Sybille and raised the French tricolor. Adam was still separated from Chiffonne by an impenetrable reef, but had now closed the distance between the ships to approximately 200 yards (180 m), well within effective range. At 10:25 Sybille was aligned correctly and Adam raised his ensign and fired the first broadside, followed instantly by fire from Chiffonne, the schooner and the battery on shore, which as planned was positioned correctly to rake Sybille. The exchange was a short one, lasting only 17 minutes. At 10:42, with casualties mounting and his ship damaged, Guiyesse struck his colours and cut his ship's anchor cables, allowing Chiffonne to drift onto the reef. The schooner had been sunk by well placed shot from the quarterdeck. Adam responded by swinging Sybille about to fire on the battery, sending ship's boats to take possession of Chiffonne and attack the shore party manning the battery. When the boats reached the beach however, the French gunners retreated inland, leaving their guns behind.

Sybille's loss was light, with two men killed and a junior officer lightly wounded. Casualties on Chiffonne were far heavier, reported as 23 killed and 30 wounded. Approximately 160 of the surviving crew were captured, with as many as 100 escaping inland from the grounded frigate or the battery. In the aftermath of the battle Adam of the Sybille demanded an explanation from the Governor of Mahé Jean-Baptiste Queau de Quincy as to why the neutrality terms had been violated by Chiffonne. Quincy was able however to persuade Adam that he was not responsible and reached an agreement that Seychelles merchant vessels flying a flag bearing the words "Seychelles Capitulation" would be allowed to pass through the British blockade of Île de France unmolested. Chiffonne was removed from the reef and repaired, Adam sailing with his prize and two captured schooners on 4 May and returning to Madras, arriving on 22 September, where Rainier authorised the purchase of the ship for the Royal Navy under the same name. Adam was subsequently presented with a commemorative sword by the Madras Insurance Company worth 200 guineas.

=== Order of battle ===
In this table, "Guns" refers to all cannon carried by the ship, including the maindeck guns which were taken into consideration when calculating its rate, as well as any carronades carried aboard. Broadside weight records the combined weight of shot which could be fired in a single simultaneous discharge of an entire broadside.

| Ship | Commander | Navy | Guns | Tons | Broadside weight | Complement | Casualties | | |
| Ship | Commander | Navy | Guns | Tons | Broadside weight | Complement | Killed | Wounded | Total |
|---|---|---|---|---|---|---|---|---|---|
| HMS Sybille | Captain Charles Adam | | 48 | 1091bm | 503 pounds (228 kg) | 271 | 2 | 1 | 3 |
| Chiffonne | Captain Pierre Guiyesse | France official | 40 | 945bm | 370 pounds (170 kg) | 296 | 23 | 30 | 53 |
Source: Clowes 1997, p. 541, James 2002, p. 143

== Action of 5 September 1801 ==
The action had a followup a few weeks later when the 18-gun French brig Flèche arrived in June from Nantes on a raiding operation with another 35 political prisoners. Flèche also used Mahé as a base to raid British shipping, under Lieutenant Jean-Baptiste Bonami, but was discovered near the Seychelles at 11:30 on 2 September by the 18-gun British ship [HMS Victor. Victor, commanded by Captain George Ralph Collier, was a small ship with an exceptionally heavy armament, mounting 16 32-pounder short-ranged carronades and two 6-pounder long guns. Collier had been detached from the Red Sea squadron to hunt for Flèche and initially sailed to Diego Garcia to stock up on turtle meat before starting his cruise off the Seychelles. Sighting his quarry, Collier gave chase and caught the French brig at 17:30, only to have his rigging badly damaged by two broadsides from Flèche, although his own guns caused considerable damage in return. Bonami used his advantage to pull away from Victor, but was unable to lose his opponent. Collier followed his elusive enemy for the next two days, occasionally pulling within range but never close enough for a decisive action. By dawn on 5 September however the French brig had escaped.

Collier assumed that Flèche was seeking shelter at Mahé and directed Victor towards the harbour. When the island came in sight at 15:30 on the same day, the French brig could be seen in the anchorage. Collier slowly approached his target, anchoring beyond the reef at 19:00. with night approaching Collier was unwilling to risk his vessel in the complex channels, and instead the ship's master, James Crawford, took a boat out during the night and took soundings to locate a safe channel. Although the boat came under fire, a course was successfully plotted. The next morning Flèche lay ready for action at the mouth of the channel, a revolutionary red flag flying at the mast head and volunteers from the escaped crew of Chiffonne helping to man the guns. Collier took Victor across the reef in the face of the French brig, which maintained a constant raking fire into the British ship as it advanced. The process took all day, Victor not reaching the safer waters of the inner road until 21:00 and gradually warping within close range of Flèche during the evening. At 23:45 Collier deemed his ship was close enough to the enemy and opened fire with his main broadside. A fierce close range duel began, lasting more than two hours, until at 02:20 on 7 September Flèche began to sink.

As British boat crews advanced on the brig to take possession, the French crew drove their brig onto the reef deliberately and set the vessel ablaze. As they departed the British crew arrived, lowered the flag and extinguished the fire. The damage to the French ship had been too great however and Flèche slowly rolled over into deeper water and sank below the surface. Although two men had been wounded in the fighting on 2 September, not a single British casualty was recorded on 7 September, despite heavy damage to the hull and rigging of Victor. Bonami later reported four of his men killed and did not specify the number of wounded, although British sailors reported seeing significantly higher casualties when they boarded the brig.

=== Order of battle ===
In this table, "Guns" refers to all cannon carried by the ship, including the maindeck guns which were taken into consideration when calculating its rate, as well as any carronades carried aboard. Broadside weight records the combined weight of shot which could be fired in a single simultaneous discharge of an entire broadside.

| Ship | Commander | Navy | Guns | Tons | Broadside weight | Complement | Casualties | | |
| Ship | Commander | Navy | Guns | Tons | Broadside weight | Complement | Killed | Wounded | Total |
|---|---|---|---|---|---|---|---|---|---|
| HMS Victor | Captain George Ralph Collier | | 18 | | 262 pounds (119 kg) | 120 | 0 | 2 | 2 |
| Flèche | Lieutenant Jean-Baptiste Bonami | France official | 18 | | 78 pounds (35 kg) | | 4 | ? | c.4 |
Source: Clowes 1997, p. 542

== Aftermath ==
The fighting at Mahé marked the final significant engagements of the war in the Indian Ocean; Lord St Vincent described the capture of Chiffonne as "the last and neatest frigate action of the war". On 1 October the terms of the Peace of Amiens were agreed, and although news did not reach the Indian Ocean until February 1802 Rainier had been expecting the peace and had launched no offensive operations in the meantime. The Peace effectively returned the theatre to its pre-war status, the only territory which permanently changed hands was Dutch Ceylon, which became a Crown Colony. Both sides sought to use the peace to rebuild their naval forces in the East Indies: no one in the theatre expected the Peace to last long, and when the Napoleonic Wars began in May 1803 both Britain and France maintained powerful squadrons in the Indian Ocean.

== Notes ==
1. Note:There is a discrepancy between sources on the number of crew aboard Chiffonne. James gives a figure of 296, of whom around 100 escaped death, injury or captivity. Clowes provides a figure of 190, perhaps quoting the number of those killed and captured as the entire crew.
