= HMS Nymph =

Sloop of the Royal Navy

History

Great Britain
- Name: HMS Nymph
- Ordered: 8 January 1777
- Builder: Chatham Dockyard
- Laid down: April 1777
- Launched: 27 May 1778
- Completed: By 27 July 1778
- Fate: Burnt by accident on 18 June 1783

General characteristics
- Class & type: 14-gun Swan-class sloop
- Tons burthen: 301 87/94 bm
- Length: 96 ft 7 in (29.4 m) (overall); 78 ft 10 in (24.0 m) (keel)
- Beam: 26 ft 10 in (8.2 m)
- Depth of hold: 12 ft 10 in (3.91 m)
- Complement: 125
- Armament: Upper deck: 14 × 6-pdrs; Quarterdeck:8 × 1/2-pdr swivels; Forecastle:4 × 1/2-pdr swivels

HMS Nymph was a 14-gun Swan-class sloop of the Royal Navy, built by Israel Pownoll and launched at Chatham Dockyard on 27 May 1778. She was accidentally burnt and sank in the British Virgin Islands in 1783.

== Construction and commissioning ==
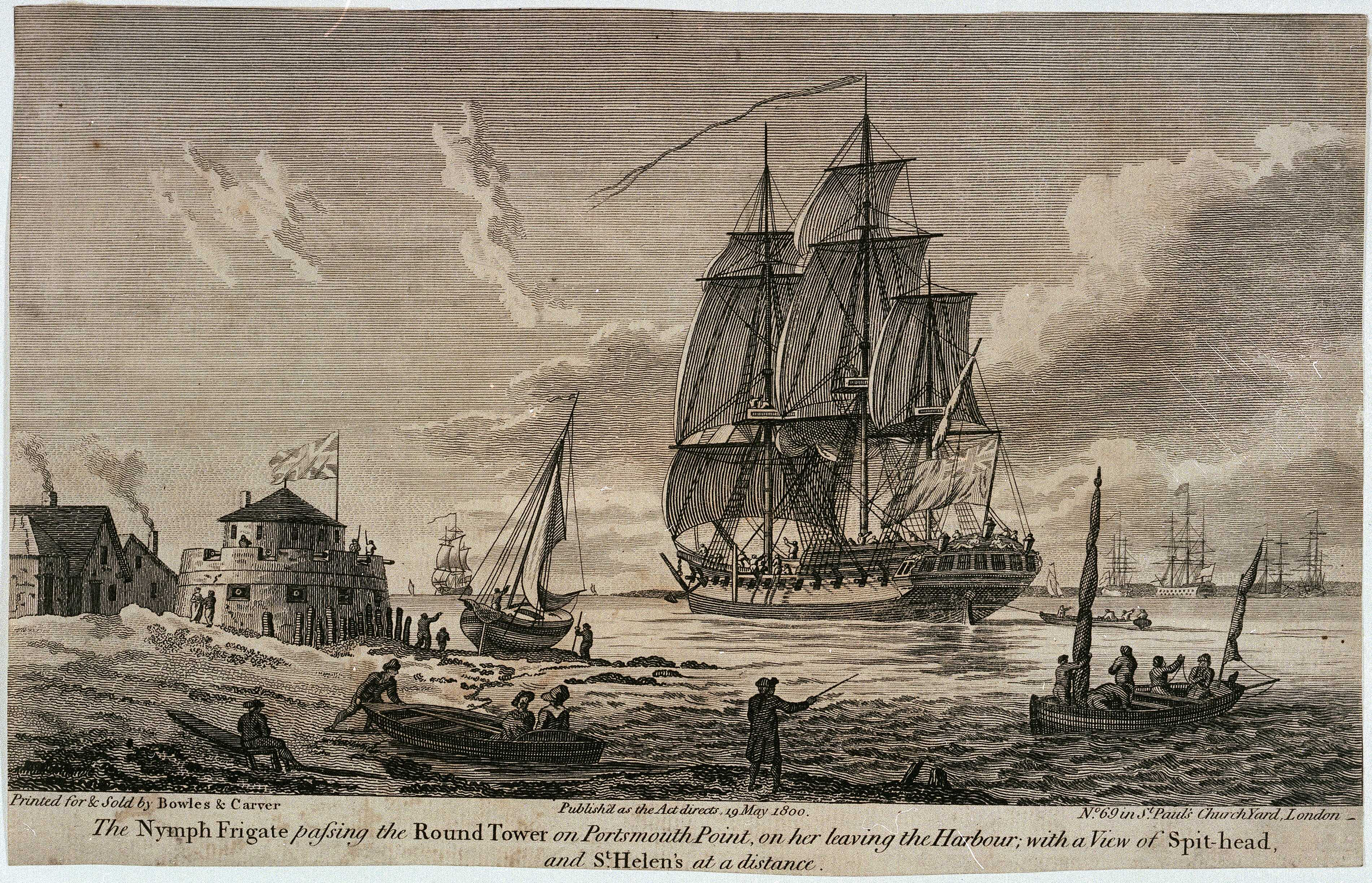
The Nymph Frigate passing the Round Tower on Portsmouth Point, on her leaving the Harbour; with a view of Spithead, and St Helen's at a distance

Nymph was ordered from Chatham Dockyard on 8 January 1777 and laid down there in April that year under master shipwright Israel Pownoll. She was launched on 27 May 1778 and completed by 27 July 1778. She cost a total of £8,640.13.4d to build, including money spent on fitting and coppering her. She was later fitted to carry 16 6 pounder guns by Admiralty orders of 1779 and 1780.

== Career ==
Nymph was commissioned in May 1778 under Commander William Denne, and served in the English Channel. She came under Commander John Blankett in January 1779 and sailed for the East Indies on 8 March that year to join Vice-Admiral Sir Edward Hughes' East India fleet. Her role was to protect English interests and island inhabitants from French and American privateers and her duties included protecting interests in Calcutta, Bombay and Madras and serving as an escort to East India merchant convoys. In January 1780 she came under Commander William Stevens, who went on to capture the American letter of marque Racoon on 9 October 1781, and, while sailing in company with HMS Amphion, took the American privateers Royal Louis on 9 October and Rambler on 30 October 1781.

She remained in the East Indies into 1782, during which time Commander John Sutton took over. Nymph returned to Britain later in the year and was refitted and re-coppered at Plymouth between August and October 1782. Commander Richard Hill then took command, and Nymph sailed for the Leeward Islands on 5 December to join Admiral Hugh Pigot and Rear-Admiral Sir Richard Hughes, of the Lesser Antilles squadron.

While at Tortola, in the Virgin Islands, a fire broke out on 28 June 1783. The crew abandoned ship and she burnt out and sank in Road Town's harbour, with the loss of three men.

== Later discovery and loss ==
In February 1969, dredging in Road Town harbour revealed the remains of the Nymph. Artefacts were removed, but no archaeological survey or site excavation was conducted. The location of the wreck was subsequently lost for many years, and remains a mystery. Since 2005, the Department of Archaeology and Anthropology at the University of Bristol have been surveying Road Harbour in an effort to locate and survey the remains of HMS Nymph.
