= List of ships named HMS Trincomalee =

At least three ships of the British Royal Navy have borne the name HMS Trincomalee, named after the city in Ceylon.

- HMS Trincomalee (1799) was a sloop of Dutch or French origin that the Royal Navy took into service in 1799 that was destroyed in action with a French privateer in October.
- HMS Trincomalee was the French privateer Gloire, launched in 1799 at Bayonne that the Royal Navy captured in 1801, and sold in 1802 into mercantile service. The French recaptured her, naming her Émilien. HMS Culloden captured her in 1806 and the Royal Navy took her into service briefly as HMS Emilien before selling her again around 1808.
- HMS Trincomalee is a Royal Navy Leda-class sailing frigate launched in 1817. She is now restored as a museum ship in Hartlepool, England.
