= Peter Rainier =

Peter Rainier may refer to:

- Peter Rainier (Royal Navy officer, born 1741) (1741–1808), British admiral
- Peter Rainier (Royal Navy officer, born 1784) (1784–1836), British captain, nephew of the above

== See also ==
- Peter Rainer, German violinist
