= Trincomalee massacre =

Trincomalee massacre may refer to:

- Kumarapuram massacre, or the 1996 Trincomalee massacre
- 2006 Trincomalee massacre of students
- 2006 Trincomalee massacre of NGO workers, or the Muttur massacre

== See also ==
- Trincomalee
- Sri Lankan civil war
