= HMS Trincomalee (1799) =

British Royal Navy sloop

History

Great Britain
- Name: HMS Trincomalee
- Namesake: Trincomalee
- Acquired: 1799 by capture
- Fate: Destroyed in action 12 October 1799

General characteristics
- Tons burthen: 315 (bm)
- Sail plan: Sloop
- Complement: 100
- Armament: 16 × 24-pounder carronades + 2 × long guns

HMS Trincomalee was a sloop of Dutch or French origin that the British Royal Navy took into service in 1799. She was destroyed in action in 1799 with the loss of all but two of her crew.

== Career ==
The Navy commissioned Trincomalee under the command of Commander John Rowe. An Arab Dow arrived at Bombay on 6 December 1799, from Muscat. She brought information from Mr. Manesty, the British East India Company's (EIC) Resident at Bassorah. He reported that Trincomalee had been dispatched from Muscat to intercept two French ships in the Gulf of Persia that had captured Mr. Manesty's ship Pearl, on 7 October. Pearl had been carrying three lakh rupees (750,000 francs), 40 horses, 5000 "saumons de cuivre", and other cargo. In the engagement on 7 October in which Iphigénie captured Pearl, Captain Fowler of Pearl and five of her crew were killed, and a number of men wounded before she struck. Her captor then removed the bullion and cargo from Pearl, and then decided to sail for Mauritius.

Trincomalee set out in company with the Bombay Marine's cruizer Comet. (Note: The Bombay Dockyard had launched the brig Comet in 1798 for the EIC. She was of 115 tons (bm), and was armed with 12-16 guns. Some accounts of the action refer to Comet as a schooner, but that may have reflected her role, not her sail-plan.) They were cruising in the Bab-el-Mandeb when just before midnight on 12 October they encountered two vessels, the French privateer Iphigénie, Captain Jean-François Malroux du Bac, and her prize, Pearl. (Note: Iphigénie was a privateer corvette based either at Isle de France or at La Réunion, commissioned circa December 1798. At the time of her encounter with Trincomalee, Iphigénie was probably armed with two 8-pounder and ten 6-pounder guns, two 36-pounder obusiers, and four swivel guns. She is believed to have had a crew of about 150 men. One of the men aboard Iphigénie (which the report refers to as Amphitrite), was John Carmlington, who had been an officer aboard Pearl. His description of Iphigénie's armament accords in great part with that of Dermerliac. Carmlington described her armament as two 48-pounder carronades, and two 8-pounder and ten 6-pounder guns. She had a crew of about 150 men. He described Comet as having eight guns.) Trincomalee challenged them, but they did not respond and instead sailed away. The next morning the two British ships spotted them and gave chase, catching up with their quarry.

An action ensued at about 11a.m. with Trincomalee engaging Iphigénie and Comet engaging Pearl. The exchange of fire lasted about two hours when suddenly Trincomalee exploded. She was so close to Iphigénie that the explosion knocked down Iphigénie's main and mizzen masts and ruptured her sides, with the result that she soon started to founder.

Comet and Pearl broke off their engagement and picked up the few survivors. There were about 30-40 survivors from Iphigénie; Malroux du Bac drowned, apparently while trying to retrieve documents aboard his ship. Pearl's original crew had also been on board Iphigénie. Only two men from Trincomalee, a seaman and a lascar, survived.

Pearl and Comet did not renew their engagement, instead sailing off in different directions, Pearl with the survivors from Iphigénie. Comet landed the two men from Trincomalee at Muscat. Pearl arrived at Muscat on 15 October to replenish her water. There the captain of Pearl's prize crew freed John Carmlington, an officer from Pearl who had survived despite being on Iphigénie, on 24 October, the day Pearl sailed.
