= John Blankett =

British naval officer

- Born: baptised 13 February 1741
- Died: 14 July 1801; Mocha, Arabia
- Relatives: Stephen Blankett (father); Elizabeth Born (mother)
- Military career
- Allegiance: (United Kingdom) Great Britain
- Branch: Royal Navy
- Service years: 1756–1801
- Rank: Rear-Admiral
- Commands: HMS Nymph; HMS Rippon; HMS Thetis; HMS Leopard; HMS America
- Conflicts: Seven Years' War; Siege of Louisbourg; American Revolutionary War; First Battle of Ushant; French Revolutionary Wars

Rear-Admiral John Blankett, (c. 1740 – 14 July 1801) was a Royal Navy officer of the late eighteenth century who served in three major wars, but was best known for his service in the Red Sea during the late stages of the French Revolutionary Wars when he blocked French ambitions in the Indian Ocean.

== Life ==
Blankett was born in approximately 1740 and by 1758 was a midshipman in the Royal Navy, serving in HMS Somerset at the Siege of Louisbourg and the capture of Quebec. In 1761 he wrote a report on the possibility of a Northwest Passage and was promoted to lieutenant. Shortly afterwards he was convicted of murder at Gibraltar and sentenced to death, but was later reprieved. In 1763 he traveled to Russia to obtain intelligence about the recent Russian exploration of the northern Pacific coast.

In the early 1770s Blankett was again in Russia in preparation for an exploration mission to the Pacific, although this was later cancelled by Lord Sandwich. The aftermath of this caused Blankett to openly associate with Sandwich's political enemies, particularly Lord Shelburne, whom he supplied with naval information for use against Sandwich in Parliament. During the American Revolutionary War Blankett served on HMS Victory and then commanded HMS Nymph and HMS Rippon in the Caribbean, although his services were no longer required after 1780.

In 1784 after the end of the war Blankett was recalled to service in command of HMS Thetis in the Mediterranean, receiving an honour from King Ferdinand of Sicily. In 1790 he was appointed to HMS Leopard, escorting a convoy to China and the commanded HMS America on an operation to the Cape of Good Hope during the French Revolutionary Wars. In 1795 he participated in the invasion and capture of the Dutch Cape Colony. In 1798 he was given an independent command in Leopard, tasked with preventing the use of the Red Sea by the French, who had invaded Egypt earlier in the year under General Napoleon Bonaparte. With growing bitterness he retained this uneventful command for three years, the presence of his force dissuading the French from pursuing operations in the region. In 1801, his health broken by the heat and conditions in the Red Sea, he died on Leopard at Mocha on the Arabian Peninsula. In life, Blankett was noted for both his linguistic prowess and his bad temper.
